= Automotive industry in Italy =

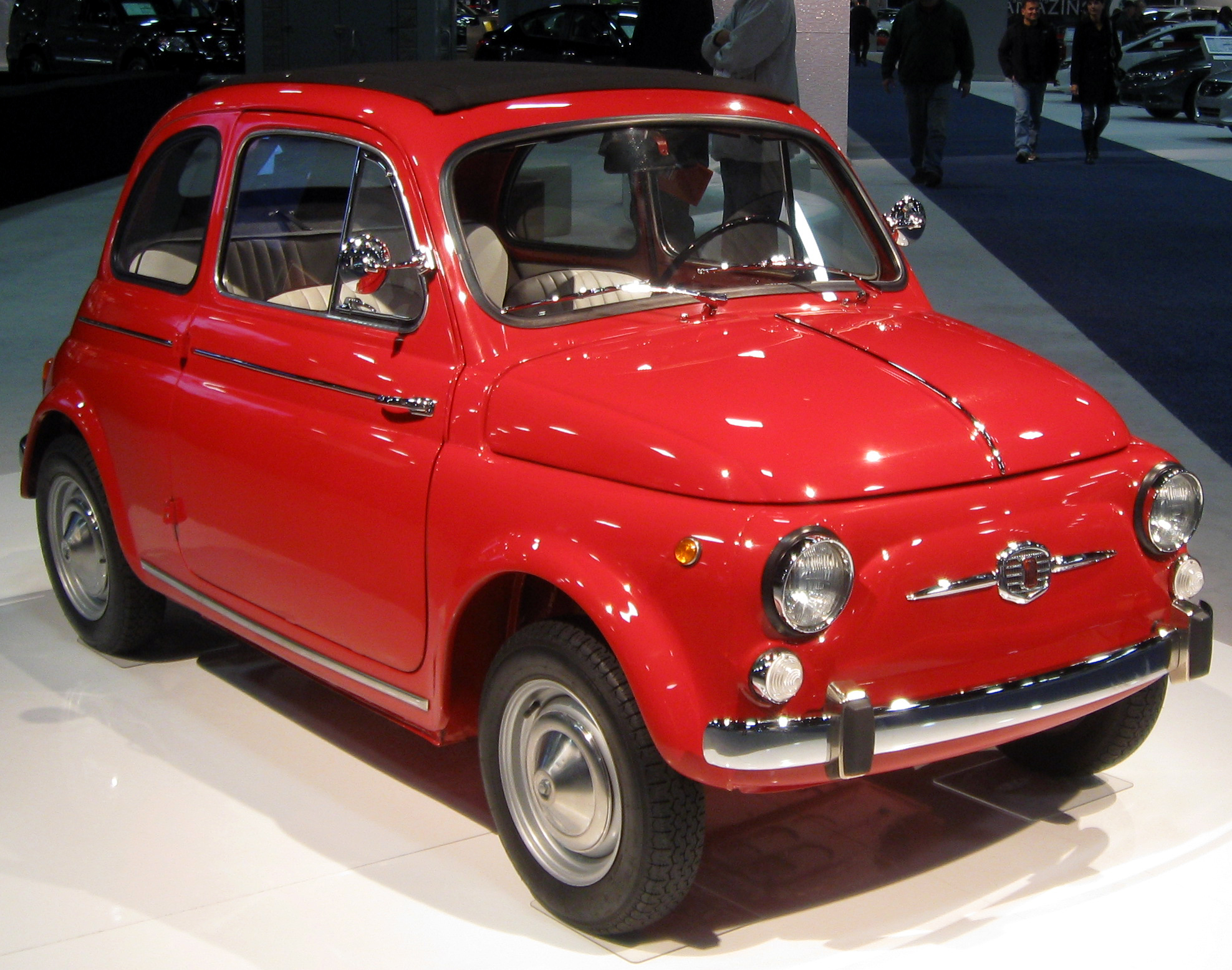
The Fiat 500, launched in 1957, is considered a symbol of Italy's postwar economic miracle.

The automotive industry in Italy is a large employer in the country, it had over 2,131 firms and employed almost 250,000 people in 2006. Italy's automotive industry is best known for its automobile designs and small city cars, sports and supercars. The automotive industry makes a contribution of 8.5% to Italian GDP.

Italy is one of the significant automobile producers both in Europe and around the world.

Today the Italian automotive industry is almost totally dominated by Stellantis (formerly called Fiat Group); in 2001 over 90% of vehicles were produced by it. As well as its own, predominantly mass market model range, Stellantis owns the mainstream Fiat brand, the upmarket Alfa Romeo and Lancia brands, and the exotic Maserati brand.

== Background ==
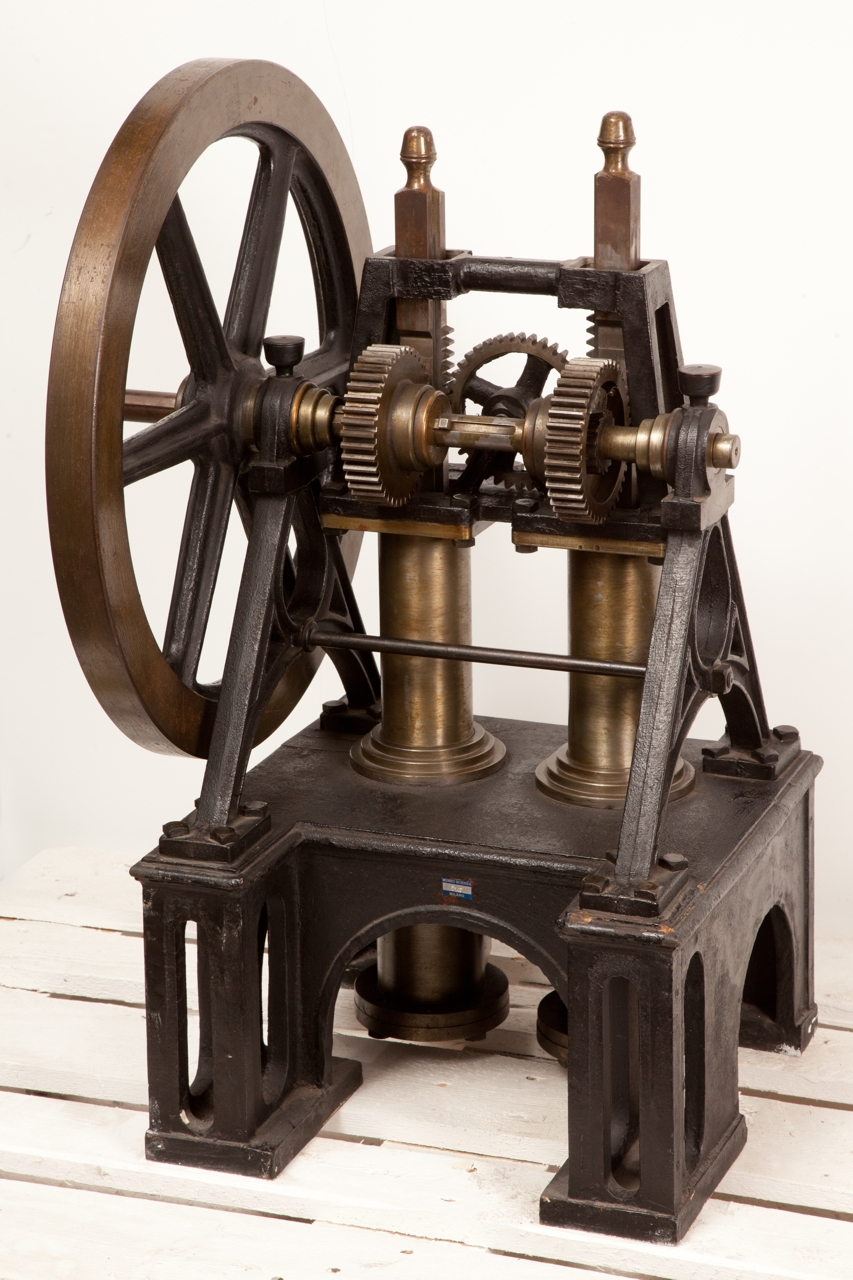
The Barsanti-Matteucci engine, the first proper internal combustion engine, exposed in the Museo Nazionale Scienza e Tecnologia Leonardo da Vinci in Milan

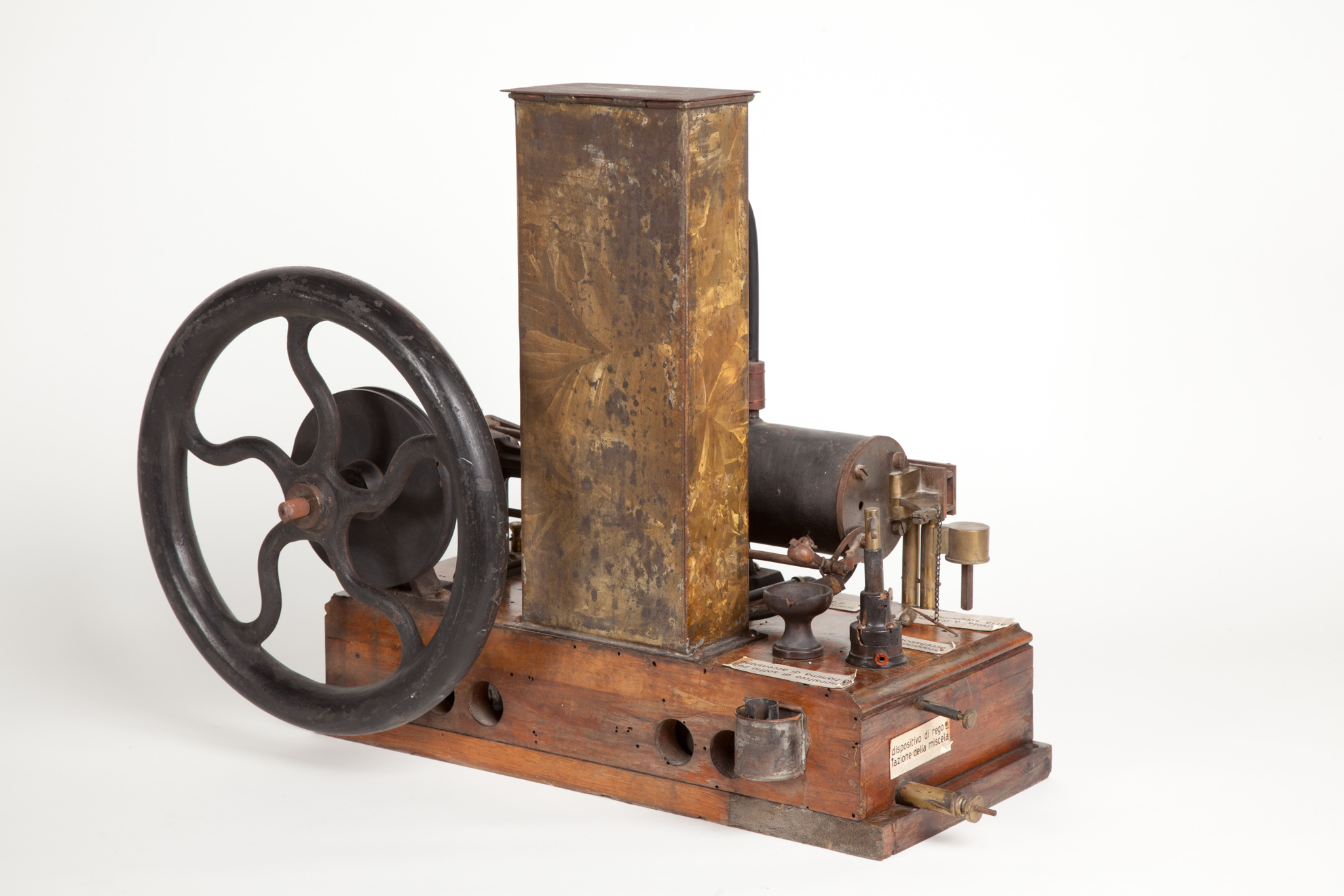
Prototype of combustion engine by Enrico Bernardi, exhibited at the Museo nazionale della scienza e della tecnologia Leonardo da Vinci, Milan.

The Barsanti-Matteucci engine was the first invented internal combustion engine using the free-piston principle in an atmospheric two cycle engine. In late 1851 or early 1852 Eugenio Barsanti, a professor of mathematics, and Felice Matteucci, an engineer and expert in mechanics and hydraulics, joined forces on a project to exploit the explosion and expansion of a gaseous mix of hydrogen and atmospheric air to transform part of the energy of such explosions into mechanical energy. The idea originated almost ten years earlier with Barsanti when, as a young man, he was teaching at St. Michael's College in Volterra, Italy. An engineer from Milan Italy, Luigi de Cristoforis, described in a paper published in the acts of the Lombard Royal Institute of Science, Literature and Art, a pneumatic machine (later built and shown to work) that ran on naphtha and an air mixture, and which constituted the first liquid fuel engine. During the twelve years of collaboration between Barsanti and Matteucci several prototypes of internal combustion engines were realized. It was the first real internal combustion engine, constituted in its simplest realization by a vertical cylinder in which an explosion of a mixture of air and hydrogen or an illuminating gas shot a piston upwards thereby creating a vacuum in the space underneath. When the piston returned to its original position, due to the action of the atmospheric pressure, it turned a toothed rod connected to a sprocket wheel and transmitted movement to the driving shaft. Numerous patents were obtained by the two inventors: the 1857 English and Piedmont patents, the 1861 Piedmont patent of Barsanti, Matteucci and Babacci which was then used as a base to construct the engine of the Escher Wyss company of Zurich and put on exhibit during the first National Expo of Florence in 1861, and the 1861 English patent.

The Italian automotive industry started in the late 1880s, with the Stefanini-Martina regarded as the first manufacturer although Enrico Bernardi had built a petrol fueled tri-cycle in 1884. Bernardi completed his secondary education in Verona and enrolled in the University of Padua in October 1859. He received a doctorate in mathematics from the University of Padua in June 1863 and remained at the university as an assistant to the chairs of the departments of Geodesy, Hydrometry, Rational Mechanics, and Experimental Physics. In 1867, Bernardi became the chair of Physics and Mechanics at the Royal Institute of Vocational Industry in Vicenza. He became dean of the Royal Institute and remained in that position until 1878, when he became a Professor of Hydraulic and Agricultural Machinery at the University of Padua and directed the Institute of Machinery there from 1879 until 1915.

== Description ==
=== From 1890s to 1920s ===
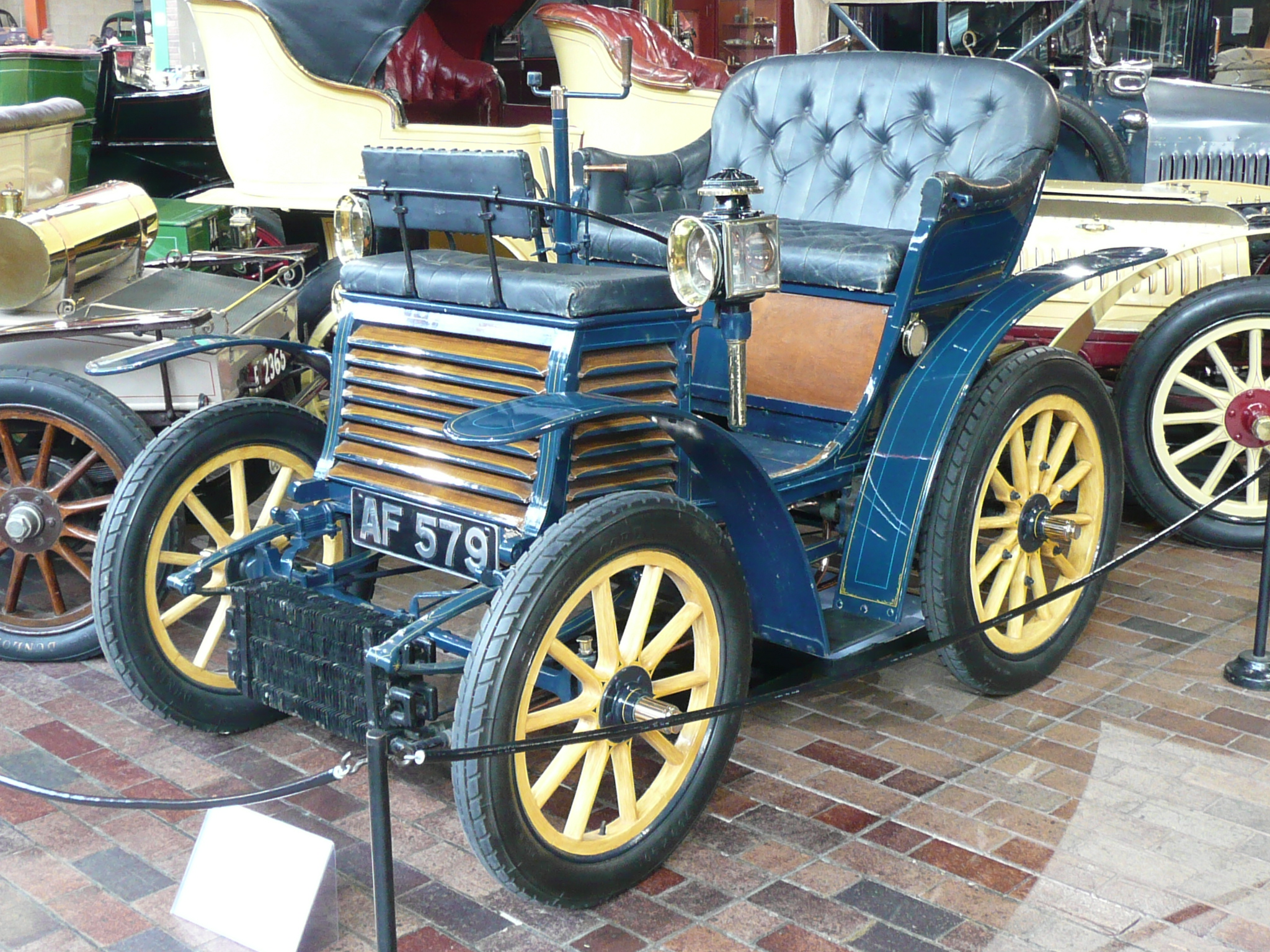
Fiat 4 HP (1899) is the first model of car produced by Fiat.

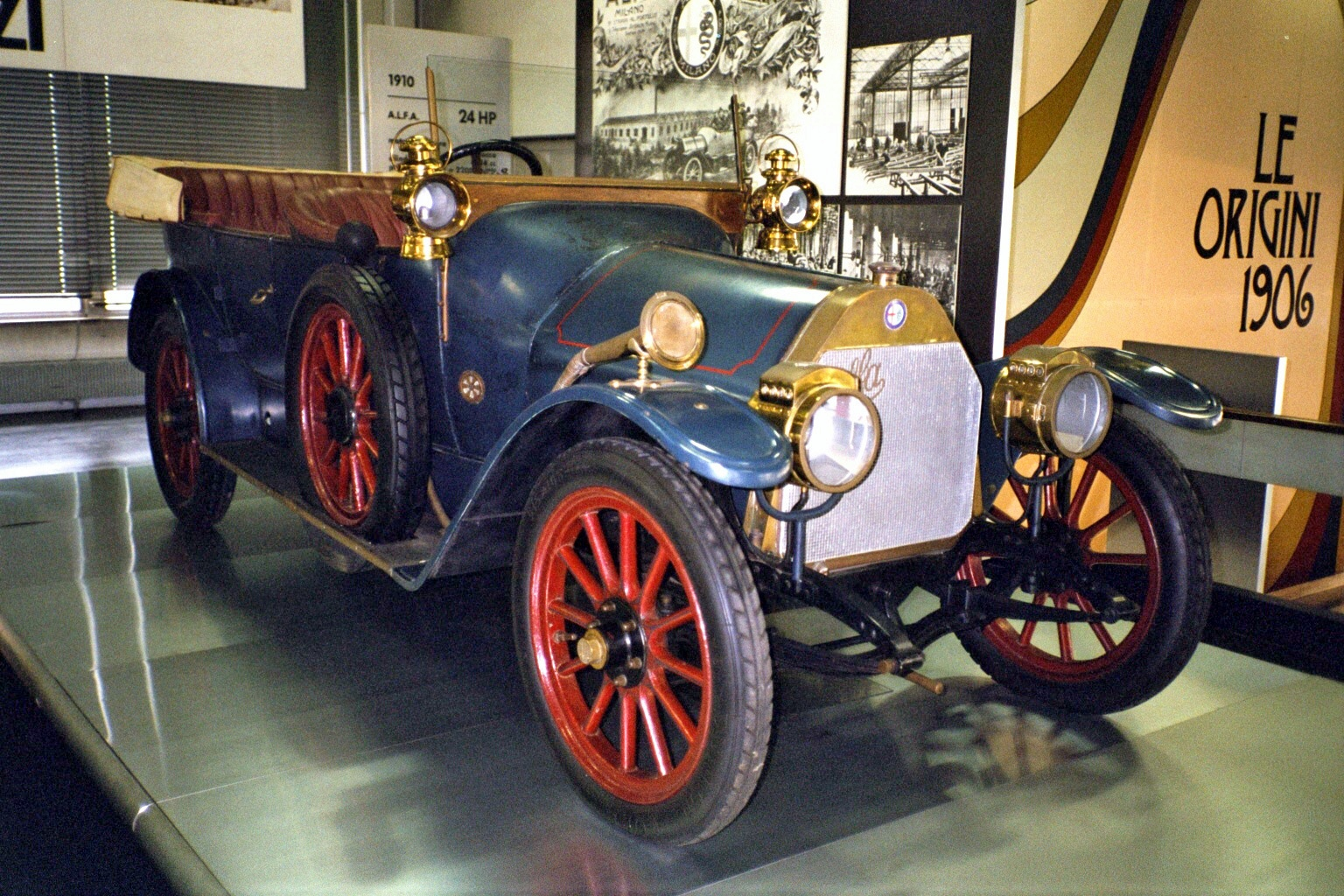
The A.L.F.A 24 HP (1910) exhibited in the Museo Alfa Romeo

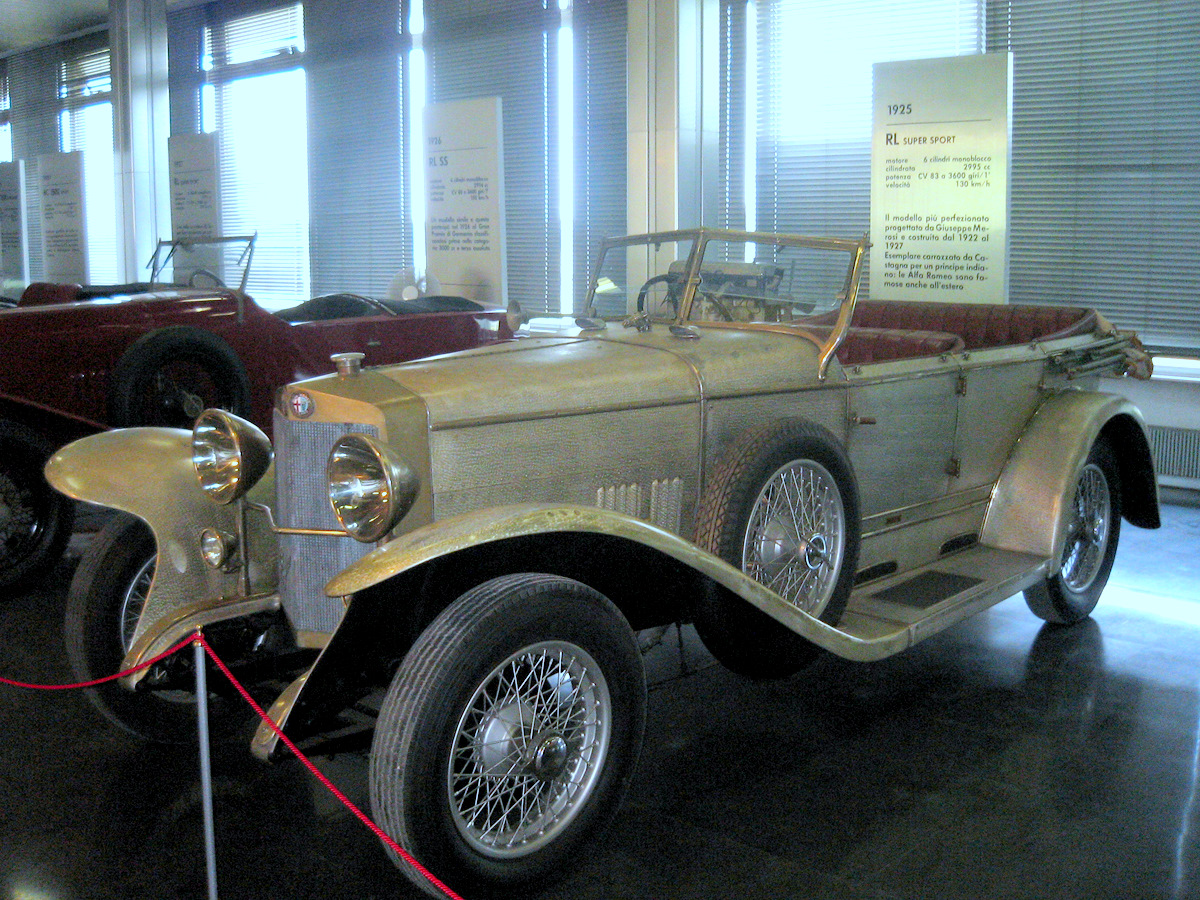
The Alfa Romeo RL (1925) exhibited in the Museo Alfa Romeo

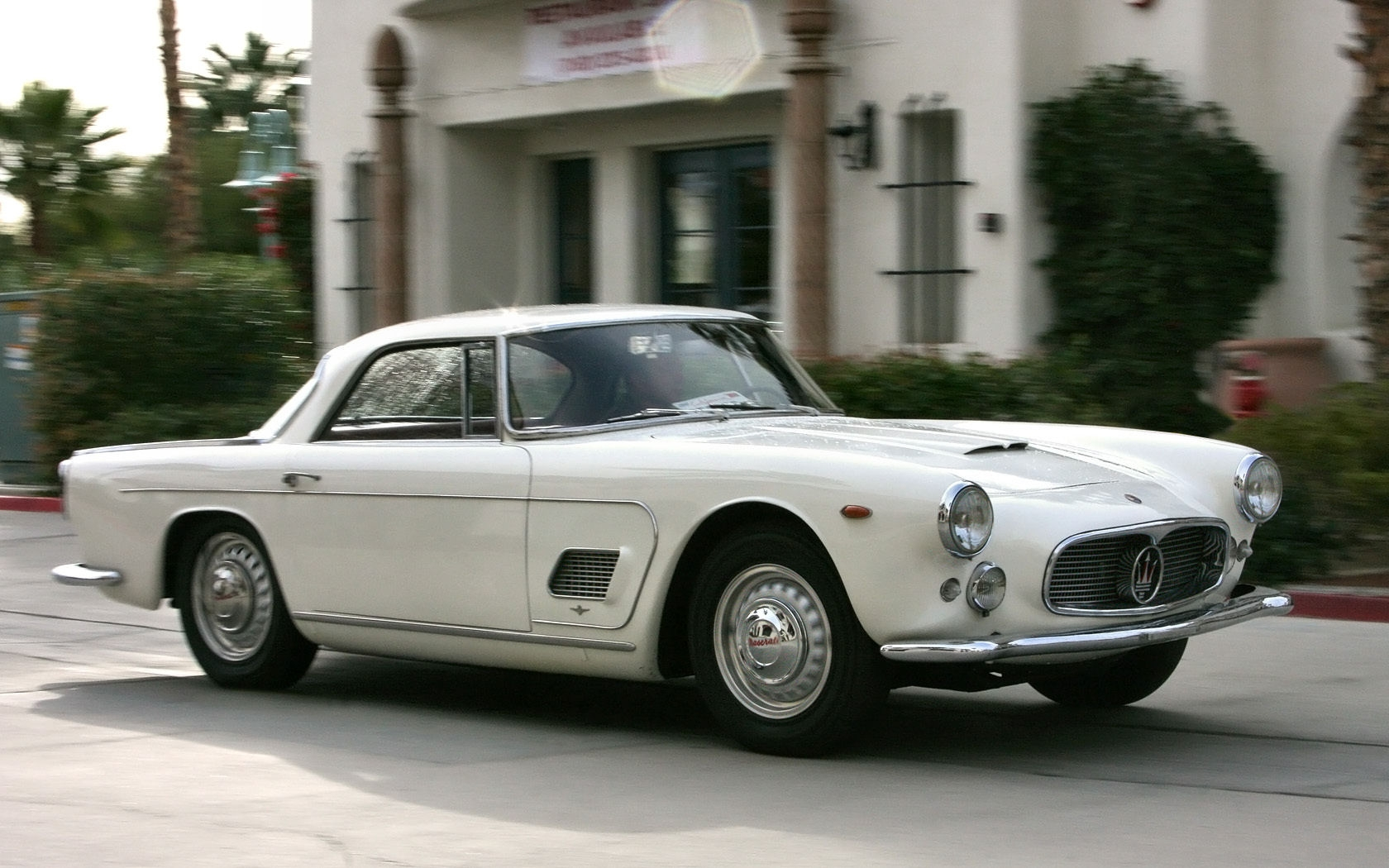
A 1958 Maserati 3500 GT

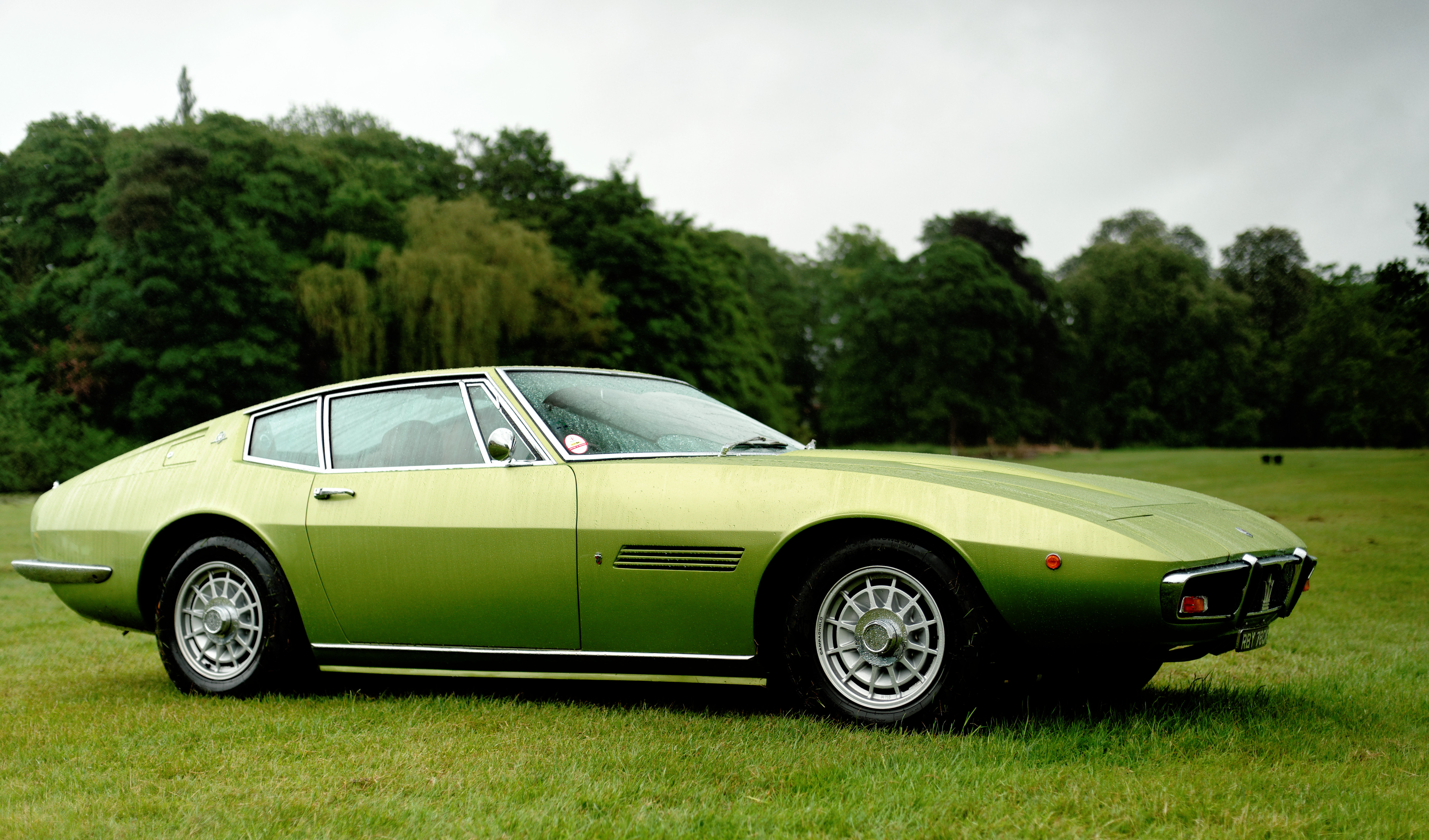
1971 Maserati Ghibli SS 4.9 Coupe

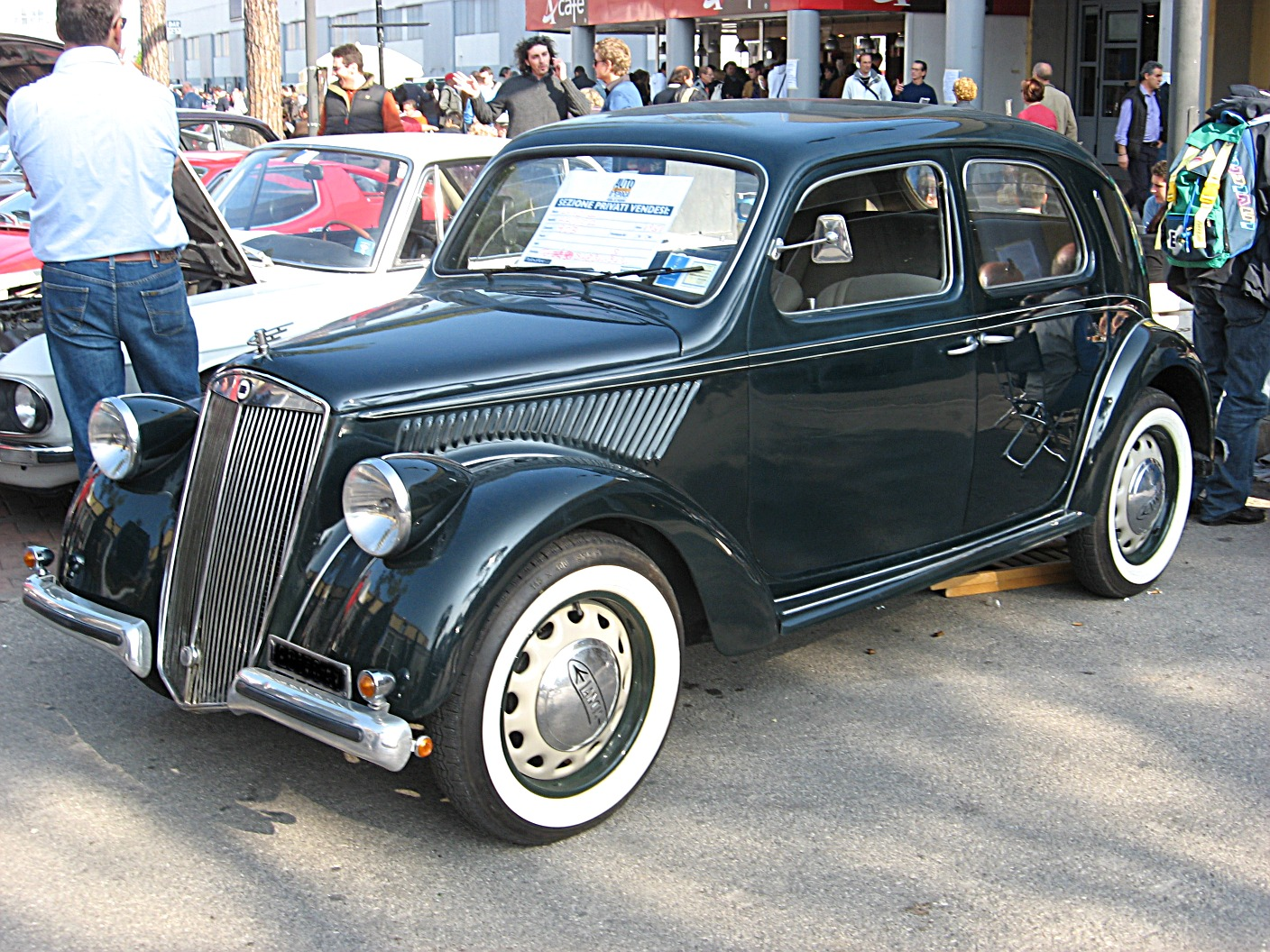
Lancia Ardea, produced from 1939 to 1953

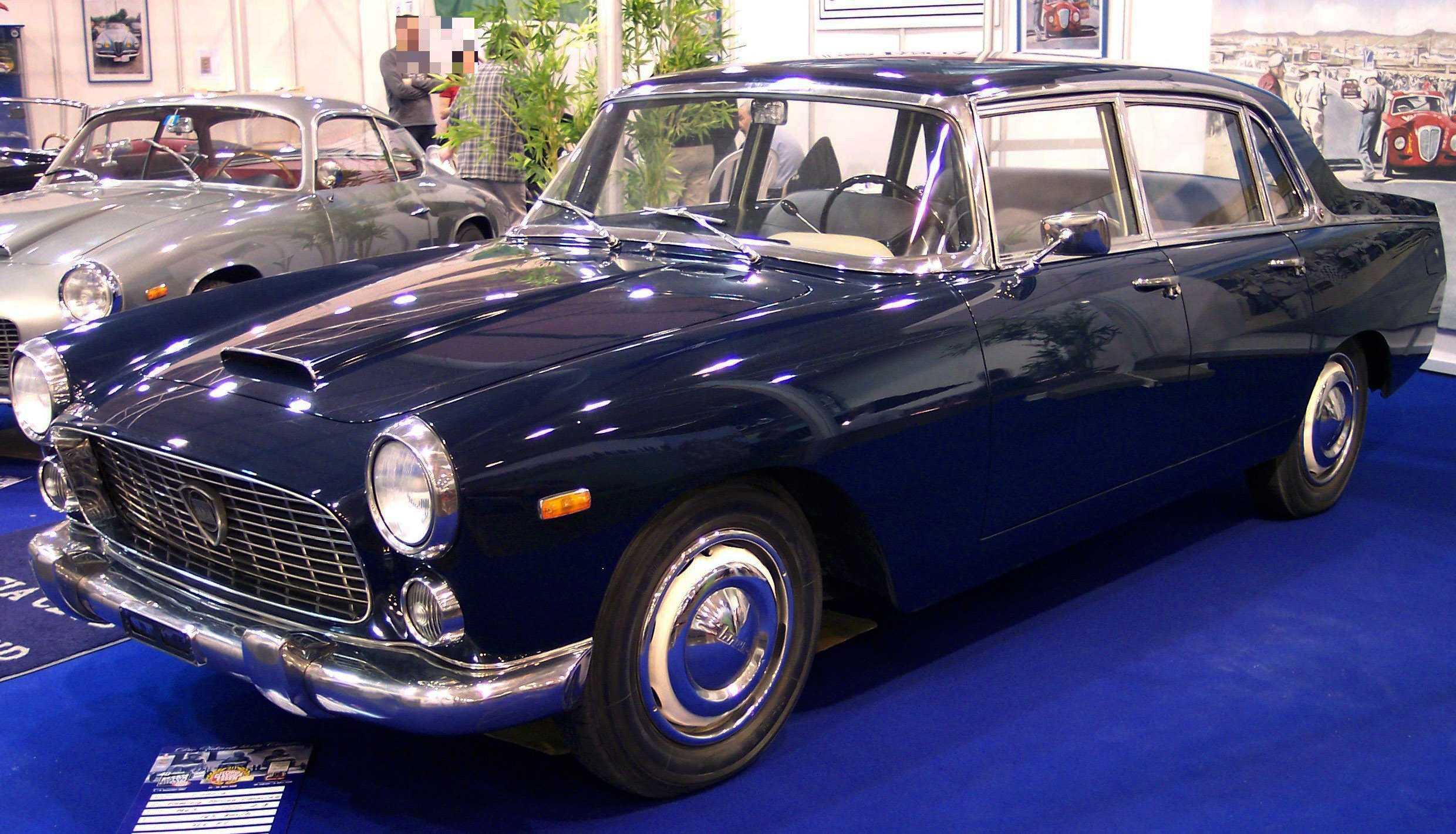
Lancia Flaminia, produced from 1957 to 1970

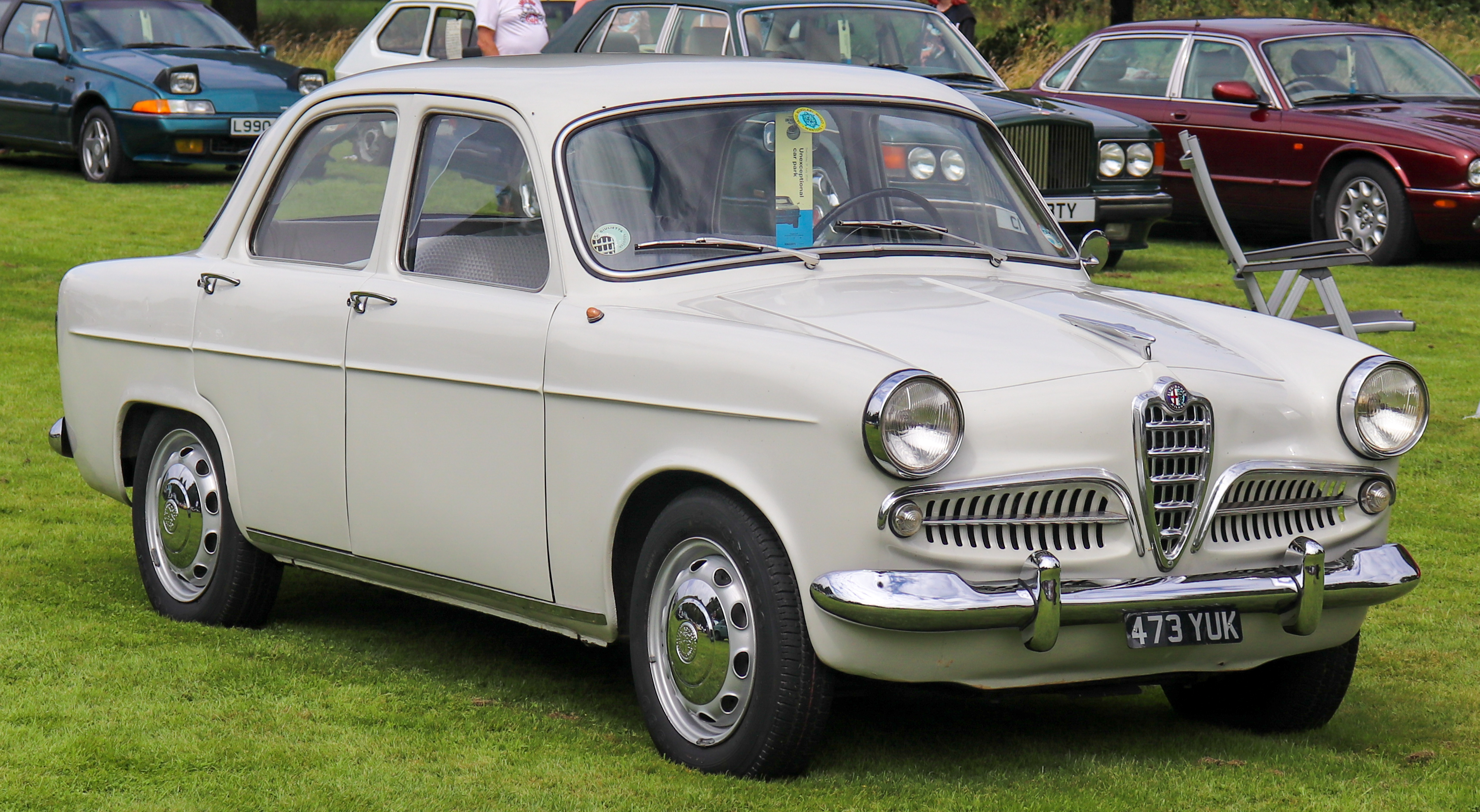
Alfa Romeo Giulietta, produced from 1954 to 1965

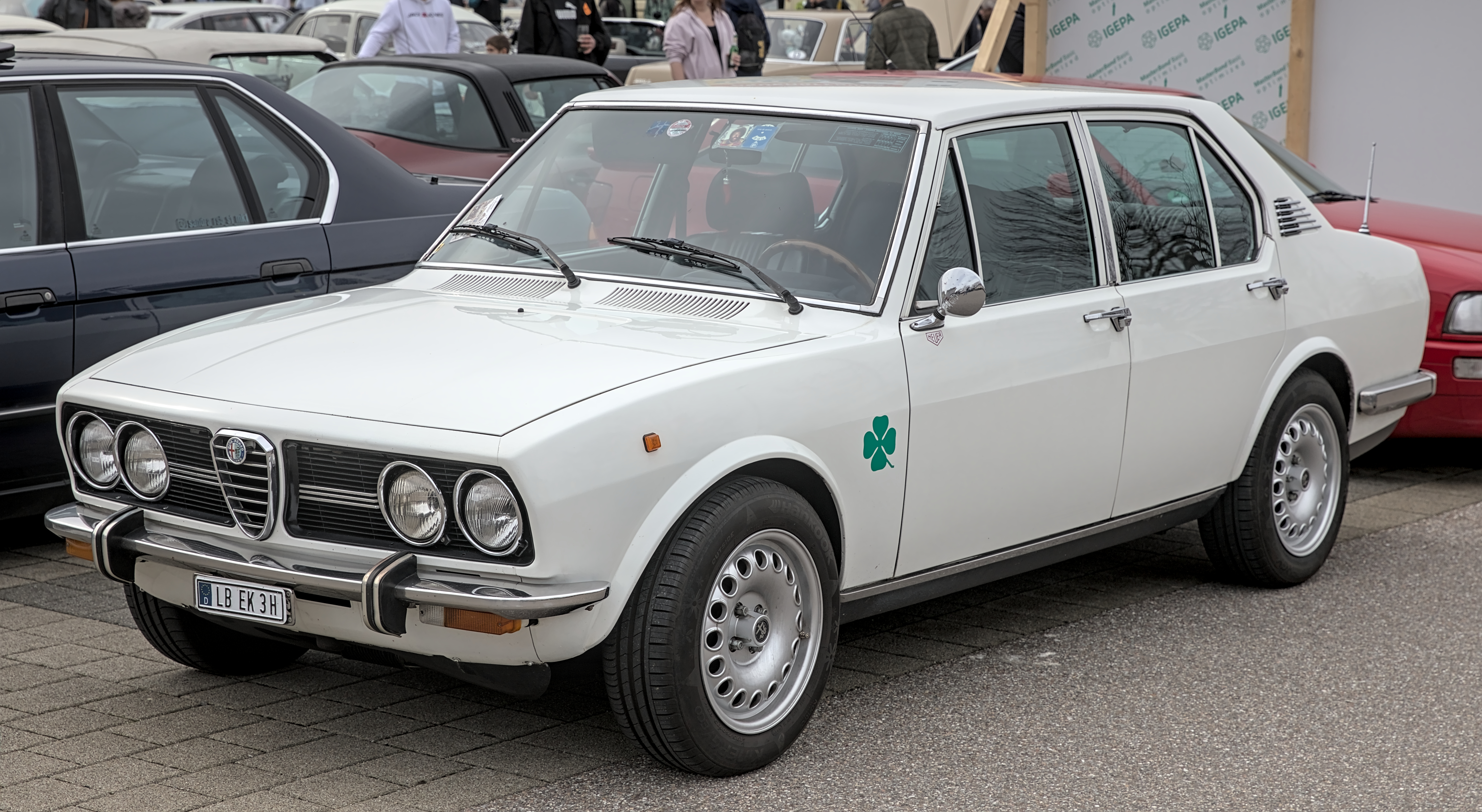
The Alfa Romeo Alfetta, produced from 1972 to 1984

In 1888 Giovanni Battista Ceirano started building Welleyes bicycles, so named because English names had more sales appeal, and in October 1898 he co-founded Ceirano GB & C with his brothers Matteo, and Ernesto to build the Welleyes motor car. As they encountered challenges of scale and finance they contacted a consortium of local nobility and business-men led by Giovanni Agnelli and in July 1899 Fiat SpA purchased the plant, design and patents – so producing the first F.I.A.T. – the Fiat 4 HP. The Welleyes / F.I.A.T 4 HP had a 679 cc engine and was capable of 35 km/h (22 mph). Known from the beginning for the talent and creativity of its engineering staff, by 1903 Fiat made a small profit and produced 135 cars; this grew to 1,149 cars by 1906. The company then went public selling shares via the Milan stock exchange.

Agnelli led the company until his death in 1945, while Vittorio Valletta administered the firm's daily activities. Its first car, the 3 ½ CV (of which only 24 copies were built, all bodied by Alessio of Turin) was based on a design purchased from Ceirano GB & C and had a 697 cc (42.5 cu in) boxer twin engine. In 1903, Fiat produced its first truck. In 1908, the first Fiat was exported to the US. That same year, the first Fiat aircraft engine was produced. Also around the same time, Fiat taxis became popular in Europe.

Isotta Fraschini, an Italian luxury car manufacturer, was founded in 1900 at first assembling Renault model automobiles. It was founded in Milan by Cesare Isotta and the brothers Vincenzo, Antonio, and Oreste Fraschini. The firm was named for its founders, Cesare Isotta and Vincenzo Fraschini, who had been importing Mors and Renault automobiles as well as Aster proprietary engines since 1899. Prior to establishing their own products in 1904, Isotta and Fraschini assembled cars very similar to Renaults, with Aster engines. They differed from the real Renaults in having a neater underslung front radiator arrangement. The first automobile bearing this marque featured a four-cylinder engine with an output of 24 horsepower (18 kW).

Itala was a car manufacturer based in Turin, Italy, from 1904 to 1934, started by Matteo Ceirano and five partners in 1903. Three cars were offered in the first year, an 18 hp, a 24 hp and a 50 hp. In 1905 they started making very large-engined racing cars with a 14.8-litre 5-cylinder model which won the Coppa Florio and the year after that the Targa Florio. In 1907 a 7,433 cc (453.6 cu in) 35/45 hp model driven by Count Scipione Borghese, 10th Prince of Sulmona who won the Peking to Paris motor race by three weeks. These sporting successes helped sales dramatically; the company continued to grow. The company experimented with a range of novel engines such as variable-stroke, sleeve-valve, and "Avalve" rotary types and at the beginning of World War I, offered a wide range of cars. During the war, Itala built aeroplane engines but made a loss producing them. An Itala mod. 35/45 HP, now exposed at the Museo Nazionale dell'Automobile ('National Automobile Museum') in Turin, became famous for the victory at the Peking to Paris.

Alfa Romeo was founded on 24 June 1910 in Milan as A.L.F.A—an acronym for Anonima Lombarda Fabbrica Automobili. The company was established by Cavaliere Ugo Stella to acquire the assets of the ailing Italian subsidiary of French carmaker Darracq, of which he had been an investor and manager. Its first car was the 24 HP, designed by Giuseppe Merosi, which became commercially successful and participated in the 1911 Targa Florio endurance race. In August 1915, ALFA was acquired by Neapolitan entrepreneur and engineer Nicola Romeo, who vastly expanded the company's portfolio to include heavy machinery and aircraft engines. In 1920, the company's name was changed to Alfa Romeo, with the Torpedo 20–30 HP being the first vehicle to bear the new brand.

Lancia was founded in 1906 in Turin by Vincenzo Lancia and Claudio Fogolin. It became part of Fiat in 1969. The brand is known for its strong rallying heritage, and technical innovations such as the unibody chassis of the 1922 Lambda and the five-speed gearbox introduced in the 1948 Ardea. Despite not competing in the World Rally Championship since 1992, Lancia still holds more Manufacturers' Championships than any other brand. Sales of Lancia-branded vehicles declined from over 300,000 annual units sold in 1990 to less than 100,000 by 2010. Despite Lancia's much smaller brand presence, the Lancia Ypsilon continues to be popular in Italy; in fact it was the second best-selling car there in 2019.

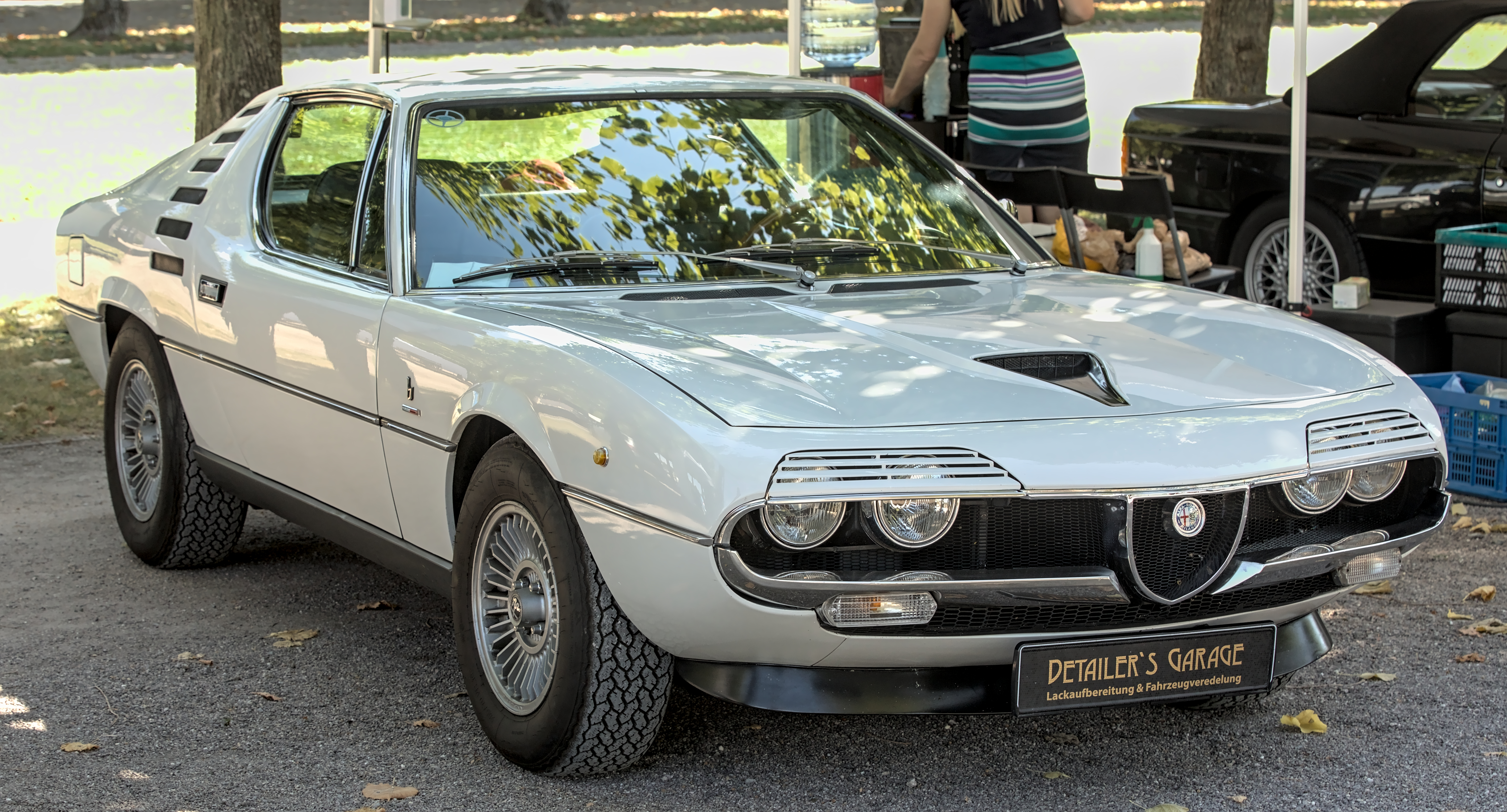
Alfa Romeo Montreal, designed by Bertone

Gruppo Bertone was an Italian industrial design company which specialized in car styling, coachbuilding and manufacturing. It was also a car manufacturing company. The company was based in Grugliasco, northern Italy. Gruppo Bertone was founded as Carrozzeria Bertone in 1912 by Giovanni Bertone. Designer Nuccio Bertone took charge of the company after World War II and the company was divided into two units: Carrozzeria for manufacturing and Stile Bertone for styling. Until its bankruptcy in 2014, the company was headed by the widow of Nuccio Bertone, Lilli Bertone. At the time of bankruptcy, it had around 100 direct employees. In 2014, most employees lost their jobs and were not absorbed by following acquisitions. Cars from the company museum went to other museums, like Automotoclub Storico Italiano and Volandia. After its bankruptcy, the Bertone name was acquired by an architect and retained by some of its former employees, who continued as a Milan-based small external design office, Bertone Design, more focused on industrial design and architecture. Bertone Design was sold to the group AKKA Technologies in the second quarter of 2016, which already had automotive design activities through Mercedes-Benz Technologies. The AKKA Technologies group subsequently sold the Bertone brand in 2020 to Mauro and Jean-Franck Ricci, the new owners. In 2022, Mauro and Jean-Franck Ricci revived the Bertone brand. The first in a series of limited edition vehicles, the GB110, was presented in December 2022, then unveiled in June 2024.

Maserati was established in 1914 in Bologna. The company's headquarters are now in Modena, and its emblem is a trident. The company has been owned by Stellantis since 2021. Maserati was initially associated with Ferrari. In May 2014, due to ambitious plans and product launches, Maserati sold a record of over 3,000 cars in one month. This caused them to increase production of the Quattroporte and Ghibli models. In addition to the Ghibli and Quattroporte, Maserati offers the Maserati GranTurismo and two SUV models, the Maserati Levante (the first ever Maserati SUV) and the Maserati Grecale. Maserati has placed a yearly production output cap at 75,000 vehicles globally.

Zagato is a coachbuilding company founded by Ugo Zagato in 1919. The design center of the company is located in Terrazzano, a village near Rho, Lombardy, Italy. Ugo Zagato was an Italian automotive designer and builder. He was born in Gavello, near Rovigo (June 25, 1890). He began his coach building career in 1919 when he left "Officine Aeronaut Aluminum Ti Che Pomilio" to set up his own business in Milan. He intended to transfer various construction techniques from aeronautics to the automotive sector. Cars of the time were often bulky and heavy; Ugo Zagato conceived them as lightweight structures with a frame in sheet aluminum similar to an aircraft fuselage.

The automobile industry grew quickly and manufacturers included Aquila Italiana, Fratelli Ceirano, Diatto, Itala, Junior, Società Ceirano Automobili Torino, S.T.A.R. Rapid, SPA, and Zust. During the first and the second World Wars and the economic crisis of the 1970s, many of these brands disappeared or were bought by FIAT or foreign manufacturers. Over the years, the Italian automobile industry has also been involved in numerous enterprises outside Italy, many of which have involved the production of Fiat-based models, including Lada in Russia, Zastava and Yugo in the former Yugoslavia, FSO (Polski Fiat) in Poland and SEAT (now part of Volkswagen) in Spain.

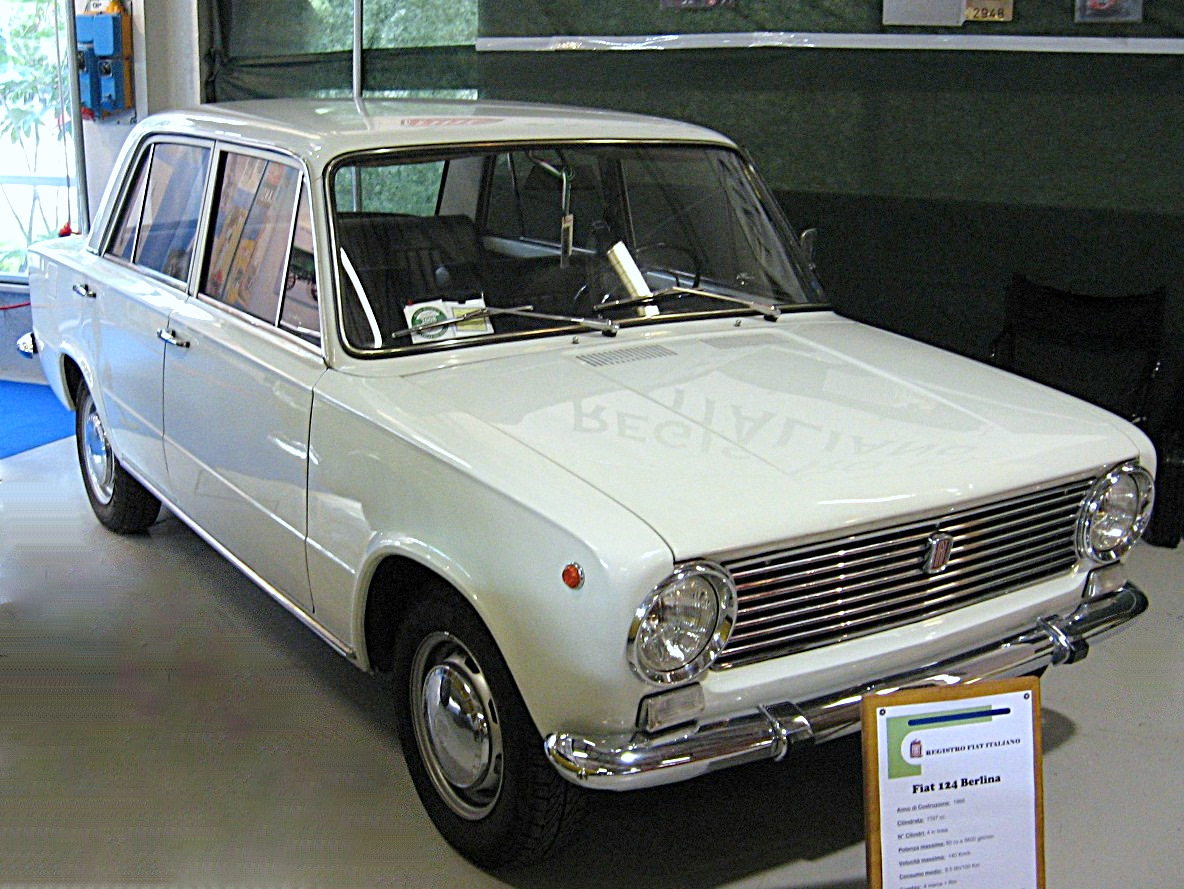
Fiat 124, 1967 European Car of the Year, the ancestor Soviet (Lada) and Turkish (TOFAŞ Murat 124, TOFAŞ Serçe) mass car industry

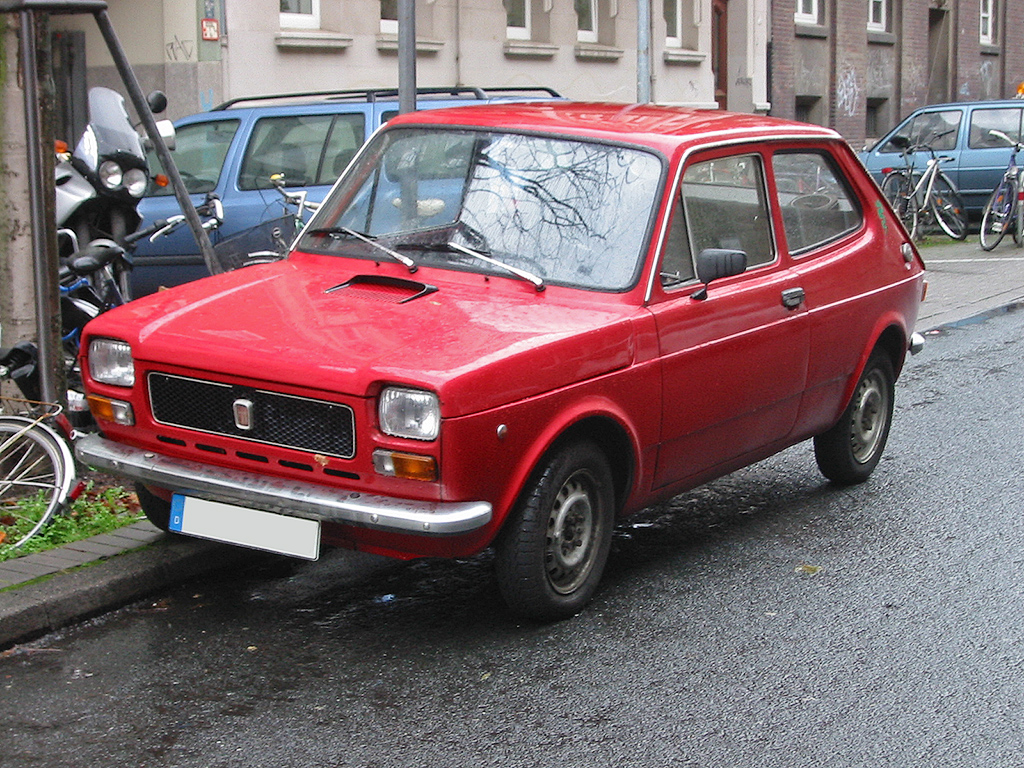
Fiat 127, 1972 European Car of the Year, the catalyst of Spanish (SEAT) and Yugoslavian (Zastava) automotive industry

=== From 1930s to 1960s ===
Pininfarina is a car design firm and coachbuilder, with headquarters in Cambiano, Turin, Italy. The company was founded by Battista "Pinin" Farina in 1930. On 14 December 2015, the Indian multinational Mahindra Group acquired 76.06% of Pininfarina S.p.A. for about €168 million. Pininfarina is employed by a wide variety of automobile manufacturers to design vehicles. These firms have included long-established customers such as Ferrari, Alfa Romeo, Peugeot, Fiat, GM, Lancia, and Maserati, to emerging companies in the Asian market with Chinese manufactures like AviChina, Chery, Changfeng, Brilliance, JAC and VinFast in Vietnam and Korean manufacturers Daewoo and Hyundai.

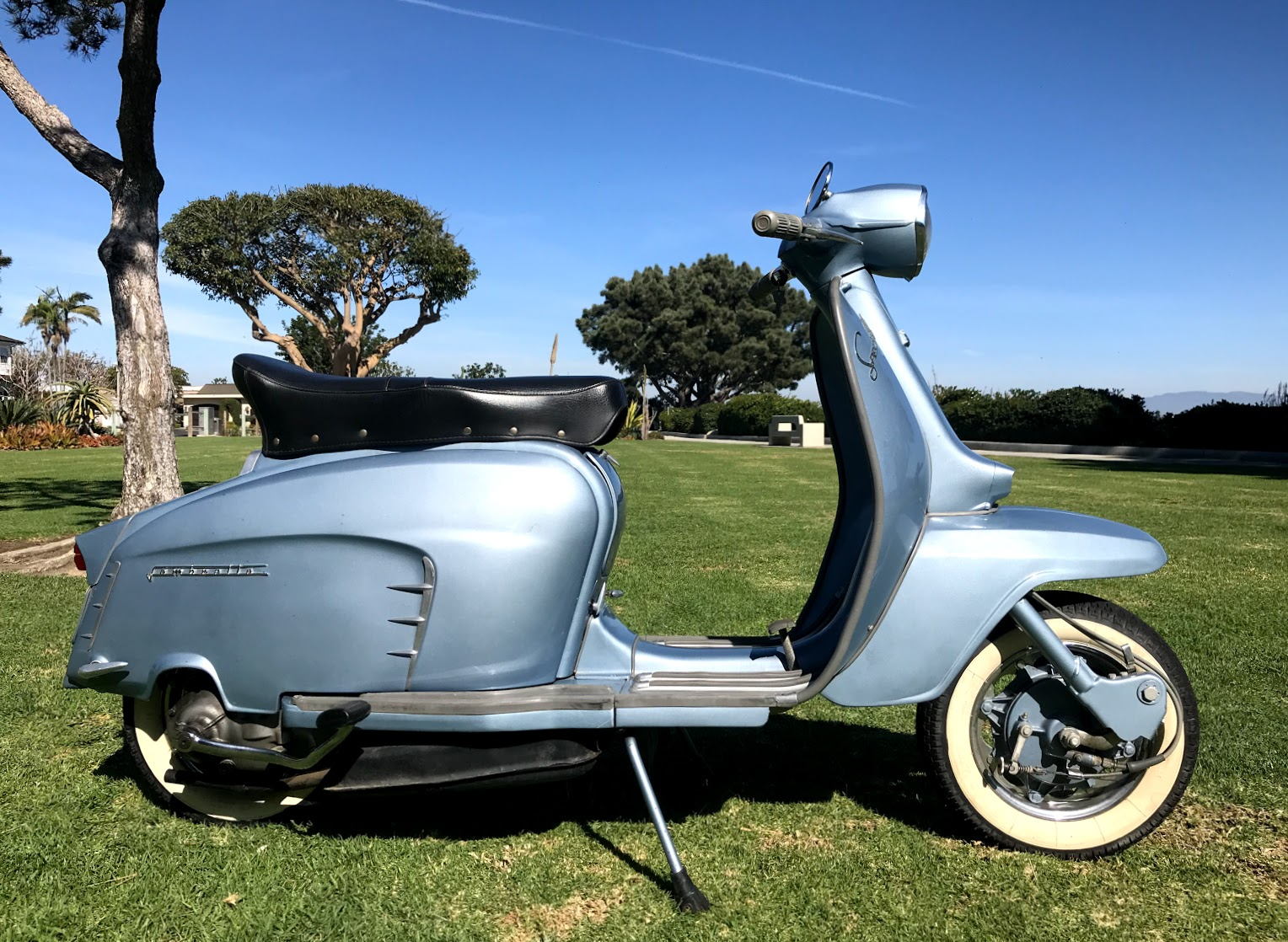
1966 Innocenti Lambretta Li 125 Special

Innocenti was a machinery works, originally established by Ferdinando Innocenti in 1933 in Lambrate, a neighborhood on the eastern outskirts of Milan. Over the years, they produced Lambretta scooters as well as a range of automobiles, mainly of British Leyland origins. The brand was retired in 1996, six years after being acquired by Fiat. After World War II, the company was famous for many years for Lambretta scooters models such as the Lambretta 48, LI125, LI150, TV175, TV200, SX125, SX150, SX200, GP125, GP150 and GP200.

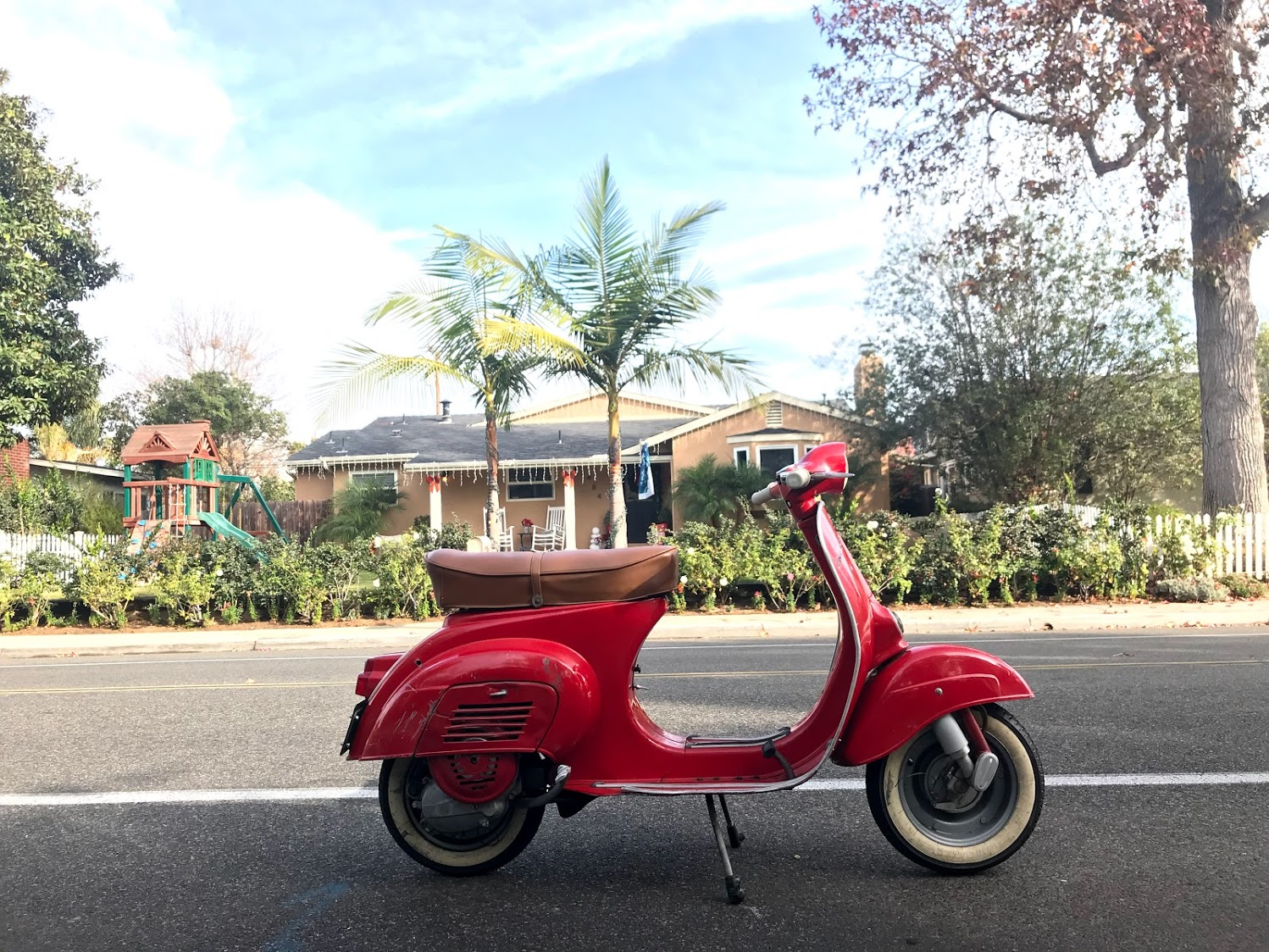
A 1964 Piaggio Vespa 90

Piaggio Group is a motor vehicle manufacturer, which produces a range of two-wheeled motor vehicles and compact commercial vehicles under four brands: Piaggio, Vespa, Aprilia, Moto Guzzi and Derbi. Its corporate headquarters are located in Pontedera, Italy. The company was founded by Rinaldo Piaggio in 1884, initially producing locomotives and railway carriages. Piaggio Group's subsidiaries employ a total of 7,053 employees and produced a total of 519,700 vehicles in 2014. The manufacturer has six research-and-development centres and operates in over 50 countries.

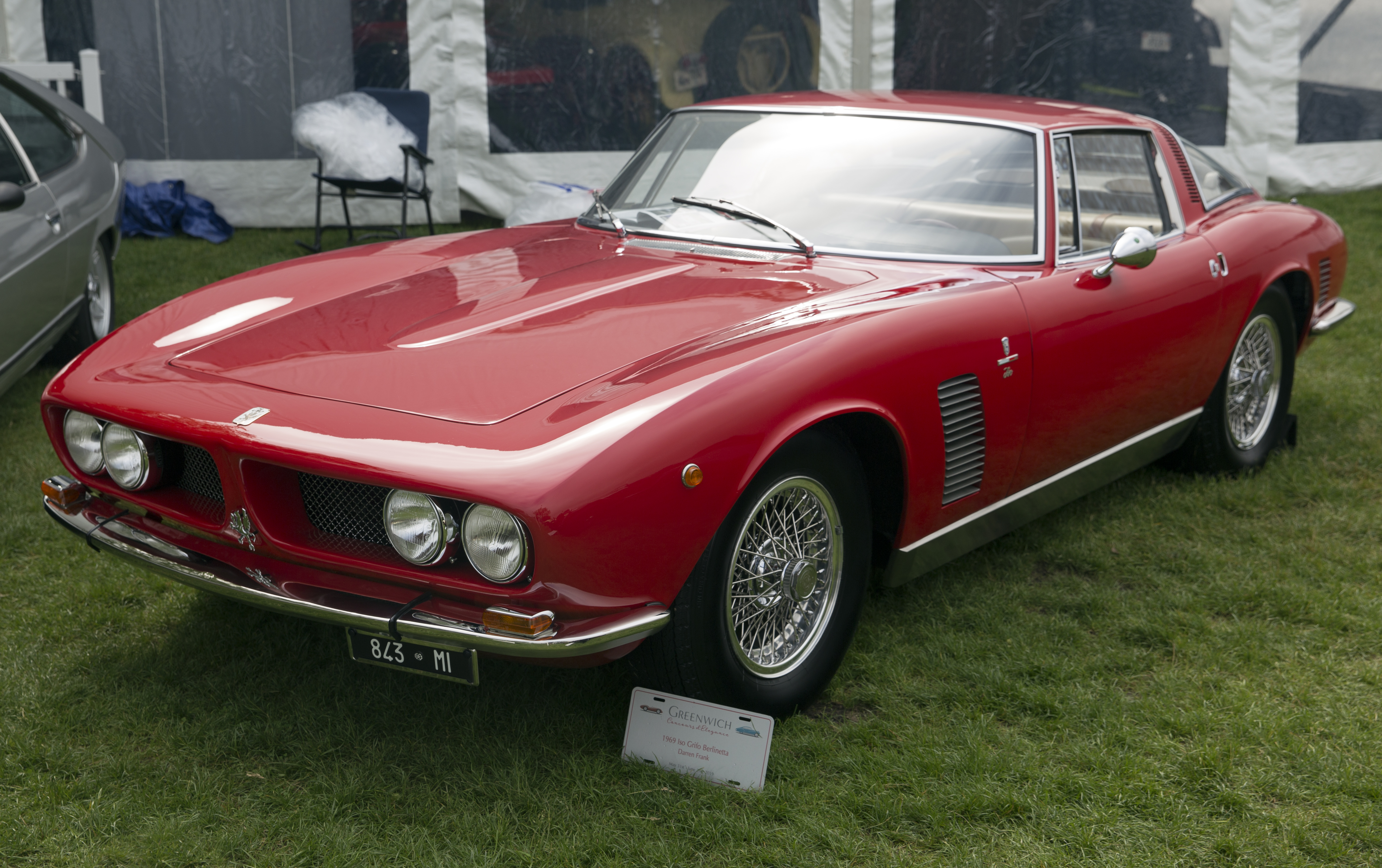
A Grifo became the Iso Rivolta's best known model

Iso Rivolta is an Italian car and motorbike manufacturer active in the motor vehicle sector since 1938. Over the years, the company has taken various names, including Isothermos, Iso Autoveicoli Spa in 1952, Iso Rivolta in 1962, Iso Motors in 1973 and, in 2017, a return to ISO Rivolta. ISO Rivolta has its origins in Isothermos of Bolzaneto, a factory producing electric heaters and chillers, purchased by the engineer Renzo Rivolta in 1939 and moved to Bresso in 1942, after a bombing raid on Genoa destroyed the offices. Immediately after the end of World War II, Renzo Rivolta decided to devote his company to the production of motorbikes, a type of market that offered significant commercial profits in those years. In the early 1950s, Renzo Rivolta developed the concept for a car that was halfway between a car and a motorbike, to bridge the gap between the classic motorcycle and the cheapest Italian car of the time, the Fiat Topolino. The idea was to create a motorbike with a body in order to have a vehicle that was equally as economical, but with the protection offered by a normal car. The company register changed to Iso Autoveicoli and in 1953 the Isetta was launched. With the start of sales in the United States and the signing of a stable powertrain contract with General Motors, the company began the production of a new lineup of models based on the GT 300 chassis (standard, extended or shortened). The result was the Grifo sports coupé (1965), with engines from 5.4 to 7 liters, the Fidia luxury saloon (1968) and the Lele 2+2 grand tourer (1969) designed by Marcello Gandini, chief designer at Bertone.

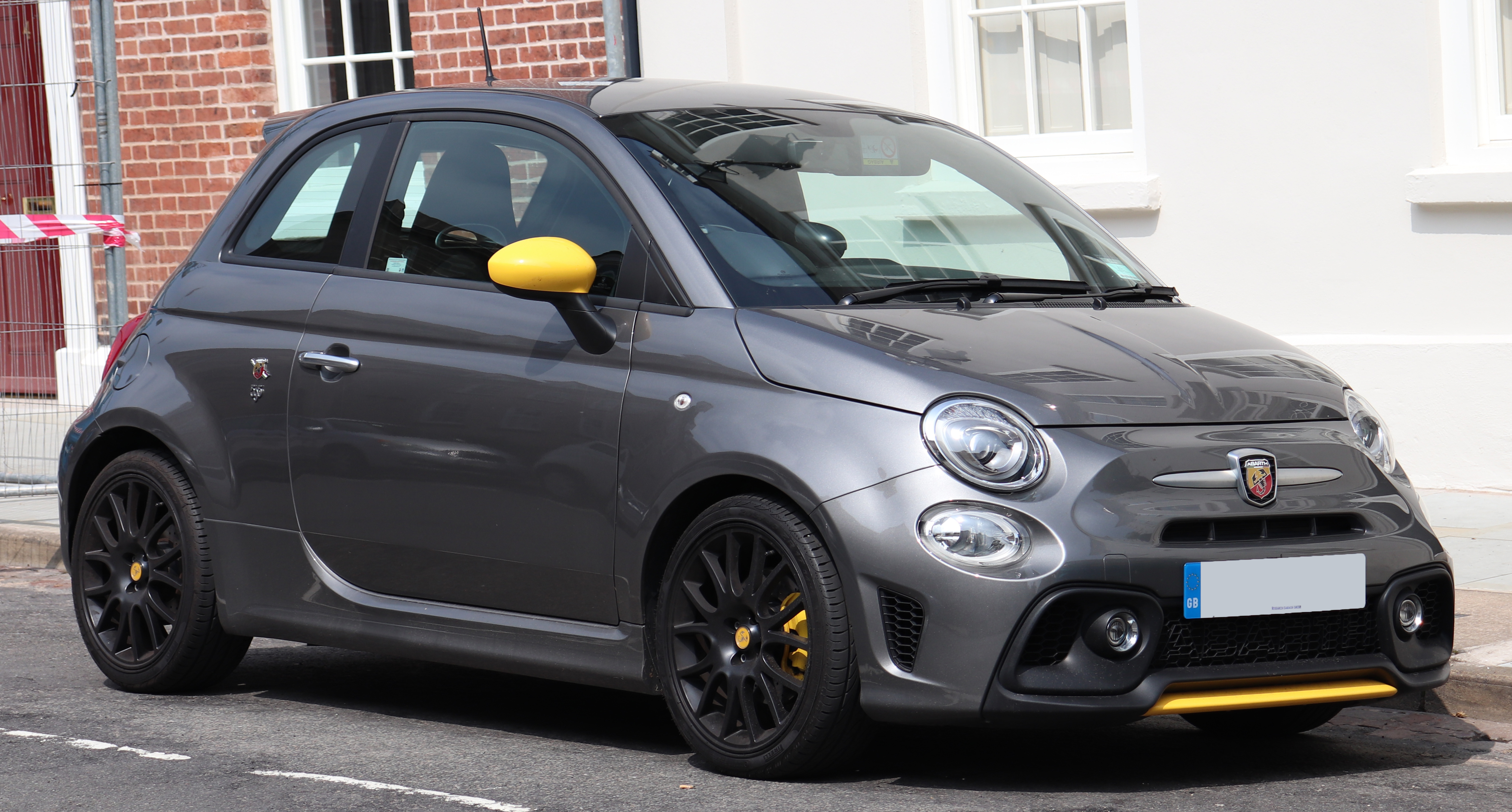
2007 Abarth 500, derived from the Fiat Nuova 500

Abarth is a racing- and road-car maker and performance division founded by Italo-Austrian Carlo Abarth in 1949. Abarth & C. S.p.A. is owned by Stellantis through its Italian subsidiary. Its logo is a shield with a stylized scorpion on a yellow and red background. Carlo Abarth was sporting director of the Cisitalia racing team starting in 1947. The following year, the manufacturer folded, and founder Piero Dusio flew to Argentina.

Ferrari is a luxury sports car manufacturer based in Maranello. Founded in 1939 by Enzo Ferrari (1898–1988), the company built its first car in 1940, adopted its current name in 1945, and began to produce its current line of road cars in 1947. Ferrari became a public company in 1960, and from 1963 to 2014 it was a subsidiary of Fiat S.p.A. It was spun off from Fiat's successor entity, Fiat Chrysler Automobiles, in 2016. The company currently offers a large model range which includes several supercars, grand tourers, and one SUV. Many early Ferraris, dating to the 1950s and 1960s, count among the most expensive cars ever sold at auction. Ferrari is one of the world's strongest brands, and it maintains a brand image built around racing heritage, luxury, and exclusivity. As of May 2023, Ferrari is also one of the largest car manufacturers by market capitalisation, with a value of approximately US$85.5 billion.

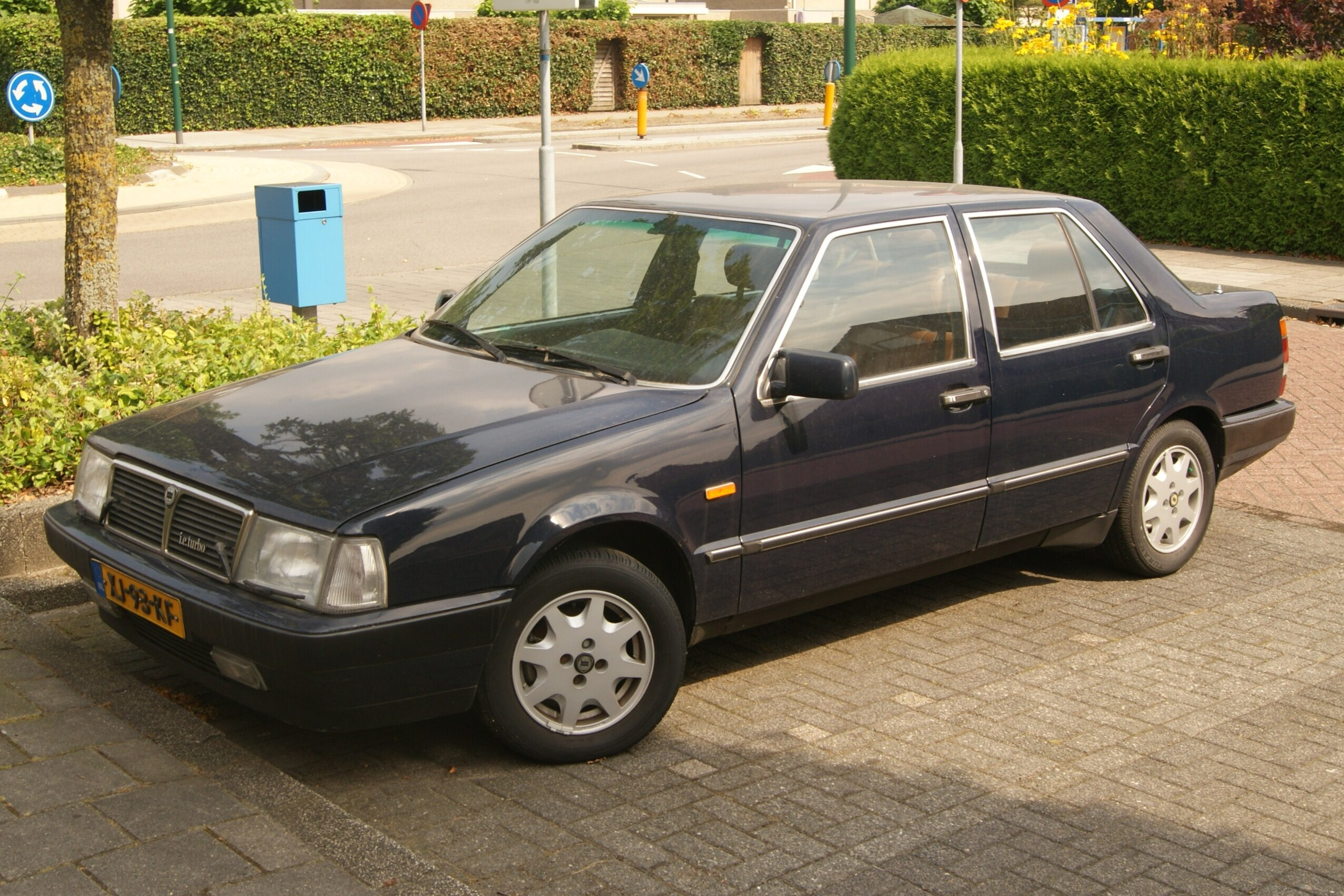
A Lancia Thema, an executive car produced between 1984 and 1994

Autobianchi was an automobile manufacturer, created jointly by Bianchi, Pirelli and Fiat in 1955. Autobianchi produced only a handful of models during its lifetime, which were almost exclusively small cars, with the biggest being the short-lived Autobianchi A111, a small family car. Autobianchis were priced higher than Fiat models of similar size and the brand was used by Fiat to test innovative concepts which later found their way into mainstream Fiat vehicles; these concepts included fibreglass bodies and front-wheel drive. The most famous Autobianchi models include the A112 released in 1969, a small hatchback very popular in Italy for racing, and which ceased production in 1986; as well as the Y10, which was the first car to use Fiat's new FIRE (Fully Integrated Robotised Engine).

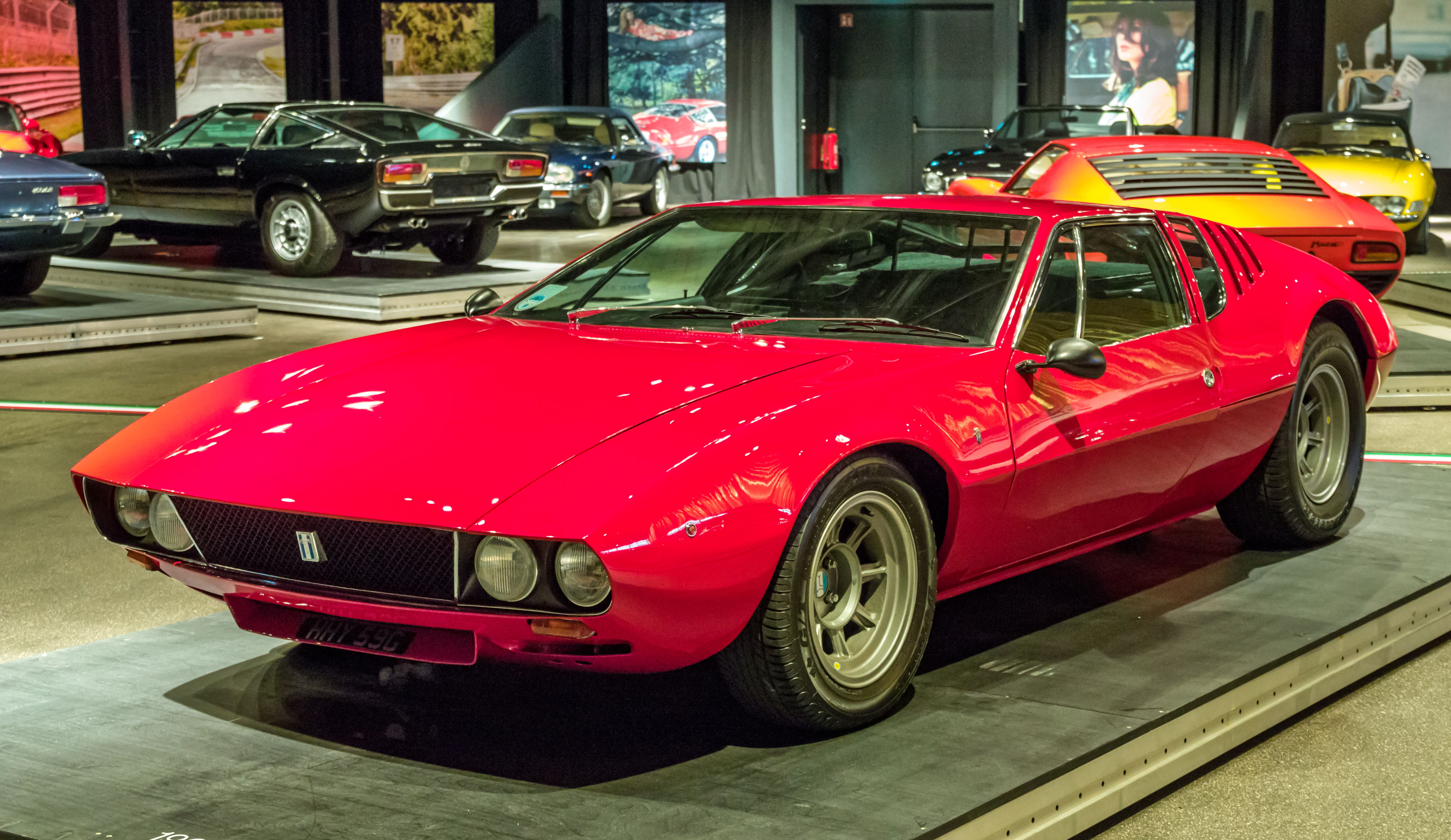
De Tomaso Mangusta, produced from 1967 to 1971

De Tomaso is a car-manufacturing company. It was founded 1959 by Alejandro de Tomaso in Modena. It originally produced various sports prototypes and auto racing vehicles, including a Formula One car for Frank Williams Racing Cars in 1970. Most of the funding for the automaker came from Amory Haskell Jr. In 1971 Ford Motor Company acquired an 84 percent stake in De Tomaso with Alejandro de Tomaso himself holding the balance. Ford sold back their stake in the automaker in 1974. The De Tomaso brand was acquired in 2014 by Hong Kong–based Ideal Team Ventures and in 2019 the newly formed company presented their first product, a retro-styled sports car called the De Tomaso P72.

Italdesign Giugiaro is a design and engineering company and brand based in Moncalieri, Italy, that traces its roots to the 1968 foundation of Studi Italiani Realizzazione Prototipi S.p.A. by Giorgetto Giugiaro and Aldo Mantovani. Best known for its automobile design work, Italdesign also offers product design, project management, styling, packaging, engineering, modeling, prototyping and testing services to manufacturers worldwide. As of 2019, Italdesign employs 917 people. On August 9, 2010, Lamborghini (Volkswagen Group) acquired 90.1% of the shares of Italdesign Giugiaro S.p.A., including the brand name rights and patents. The remaining shares were sold to Audi (Volkswagen Group) on 28 June 2015, when Giorgetto Giugiaro resigned from the firm. Giorgetto Giugiaro and Aldo Mantovani founded Studi Italiani Realizzazione Prototipi S.p.A. (SIRP), the company that would eventually become Italdesign, on February 13, 1968, in Moncalieri, Italy.

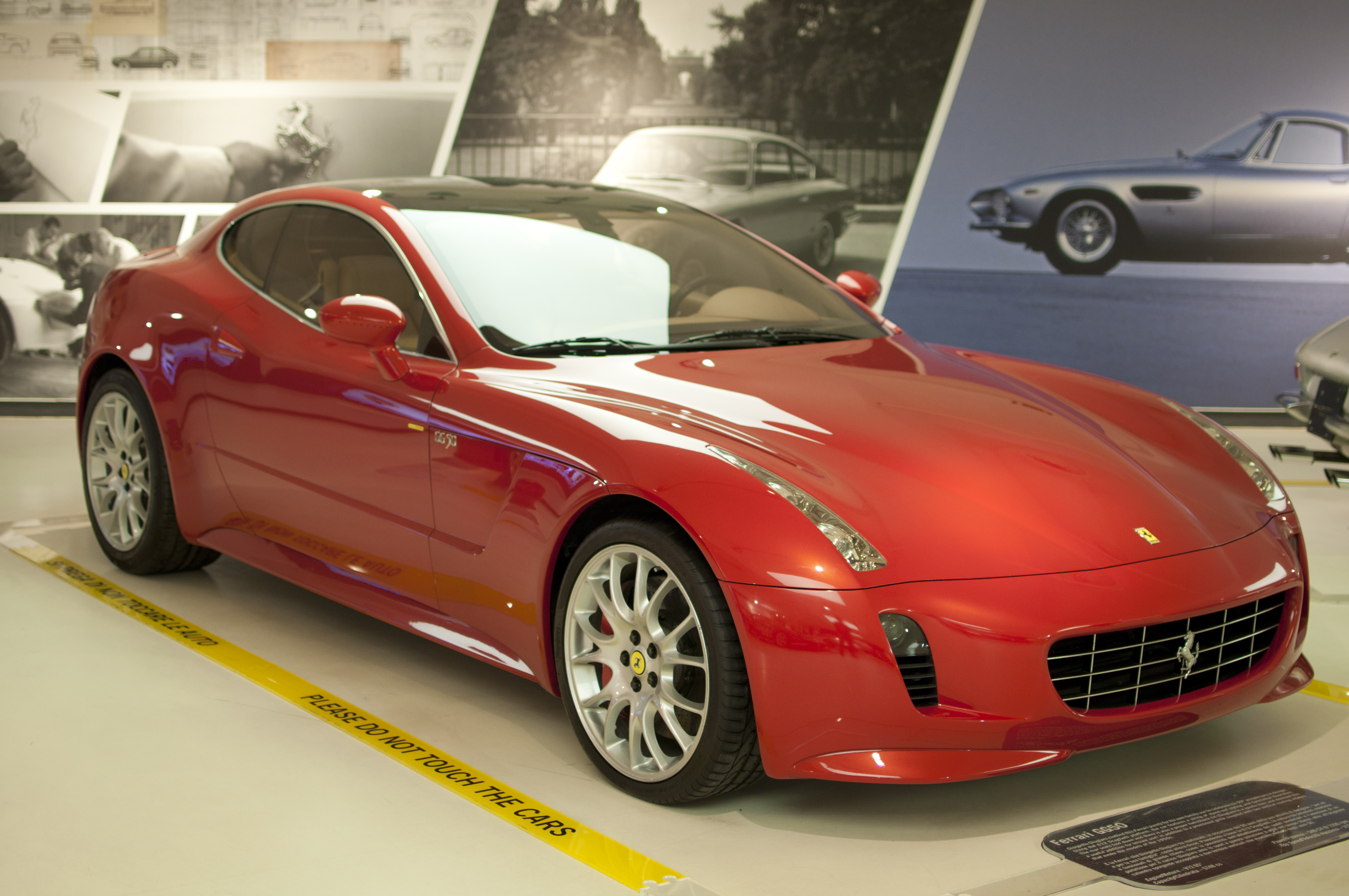
A 2005 Ferrari GG50 ("Giorgetto Giugiaro 50"), marking Giugiaro's 50 years in design. On display in the Museo Ferrari

=== From 1960s to present ===
In the 1960s and 1970s, Italy restored its own large auto industry that was 3rd or 4th in Europe and 5th or 6th in the World. In the 1980s, Italy overtook the United Kingdom but conceded to the Soviet Union which, like Spain, Poland and Yugoslavia, began large-volume production of cars with Italian FIAT help. Lamborghini is a manufacturer of luxury sports cars and SUVs based in Sant'Agata Bolognese. The company is owned by the Volkswagen Group through its subsidiary Audi. Ferruccio Lamborghini (1916–1993), an Italian manufacturing magnate, founded Automobili Ferruccio Lamborghini S.p.A. in 1963 to compete with Ferrari. The company was noted for using a rear mid-engine, rear-wheel drive layout. Lamborghini grew rapidly during its first decade, but sales plunged in the wake of the 1973 worldwide financial downturn and the oil crisis. The firm's ownership changed three times after 1973, including a bankruptcy in 1978. American Chrysler Corporation took control of Lamborghini in 1987 and sold it to Malaysian investment group Mycom Setdco and Indonesian group V'Power Corporation in 1994. In 1998, Mycom Setdco and V'Power sold Lamborghini to the Volkswagen Group where it was placed under the control of the group's Audi division. New products and model lines were introduced to the brand's portfolio and brought to the market and saw an increased productivity for the brand. In the late 2000s, during the Great Recession, Lamborghini's sales dropped nearly 50%.

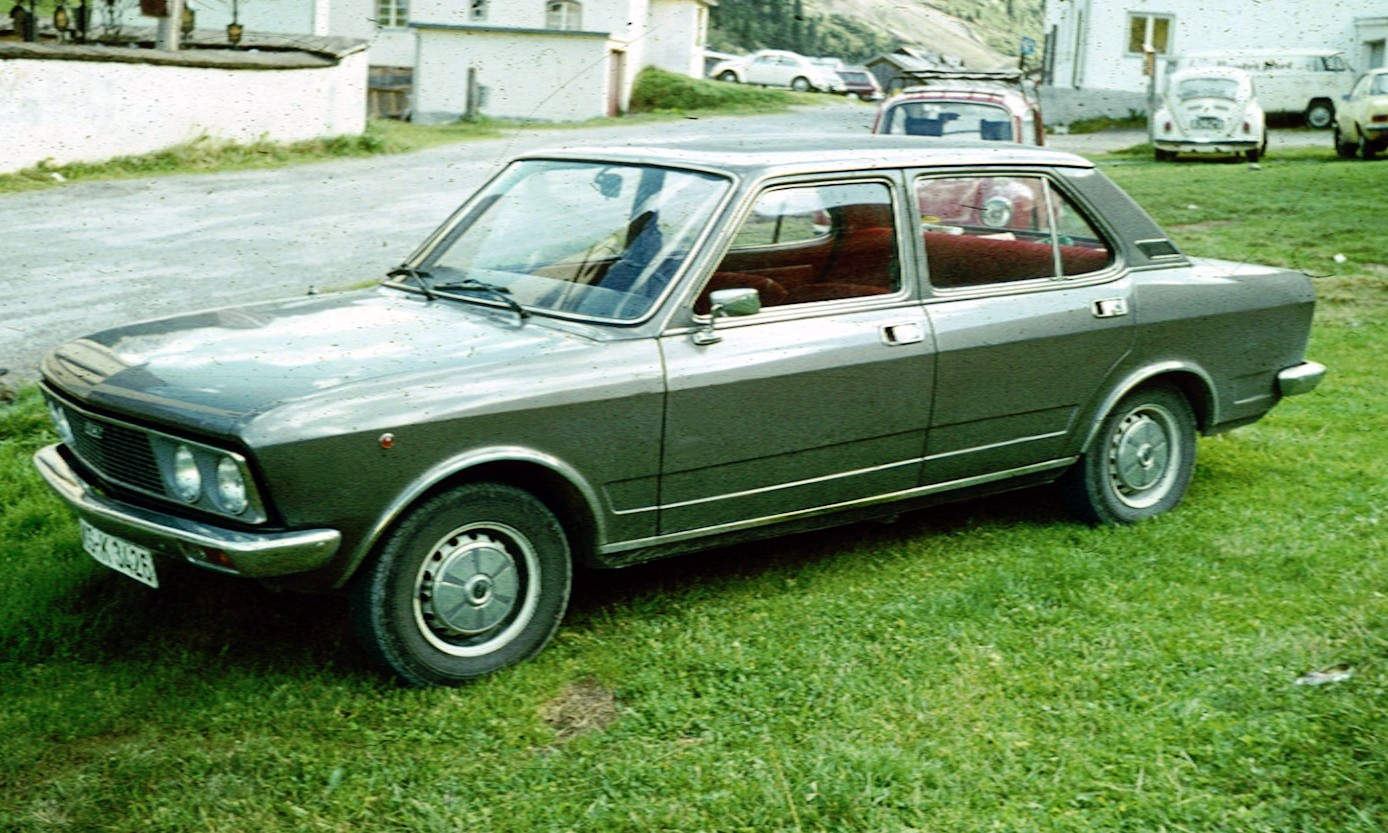
Fiat 132, produced from 1972 to 1981. An updated version of the 132, called the Argenta, was produced from 1981 to 1985

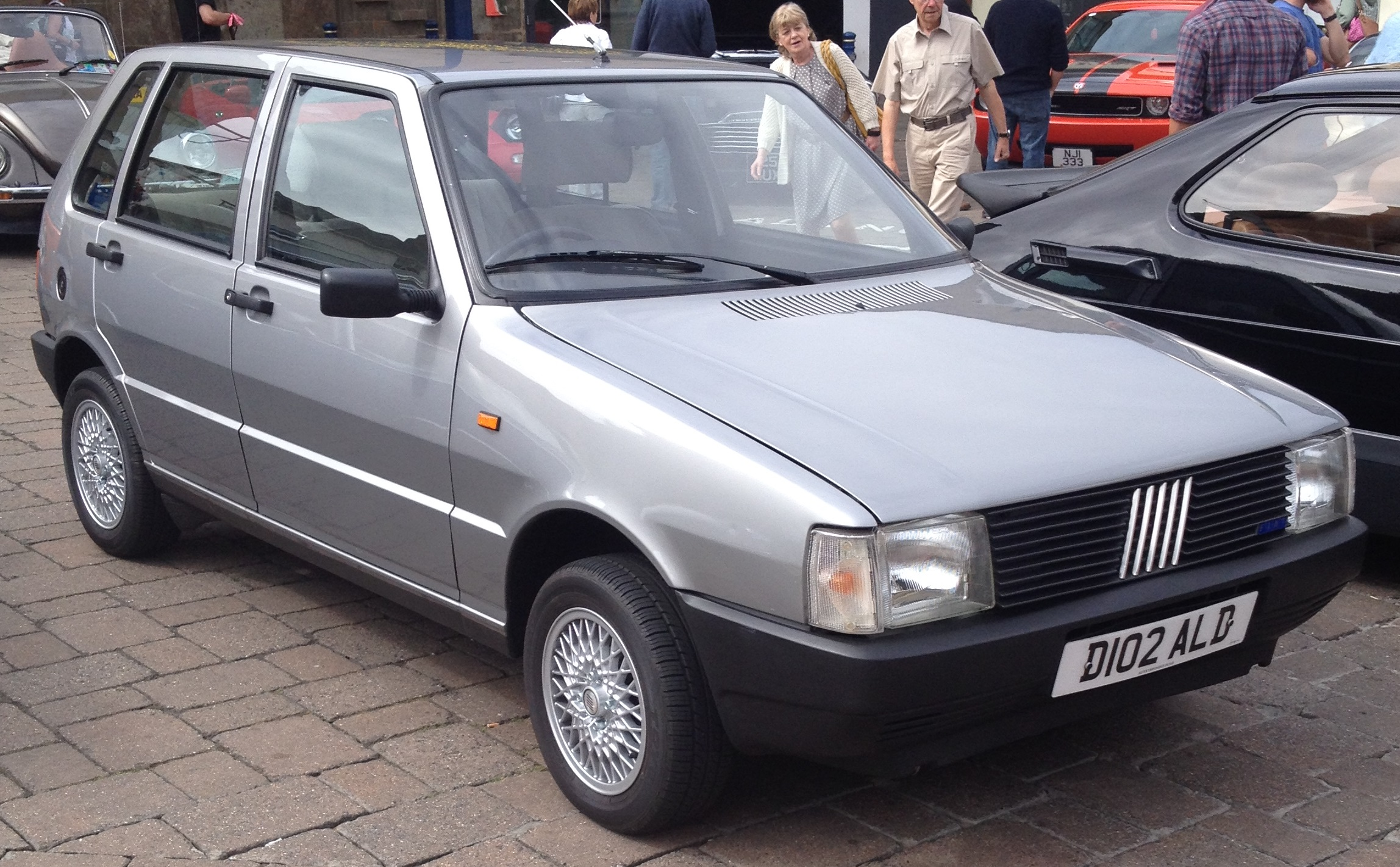
Fiat Uno, 1984 European Car of the Year, eighth bestselling automobile platform in history

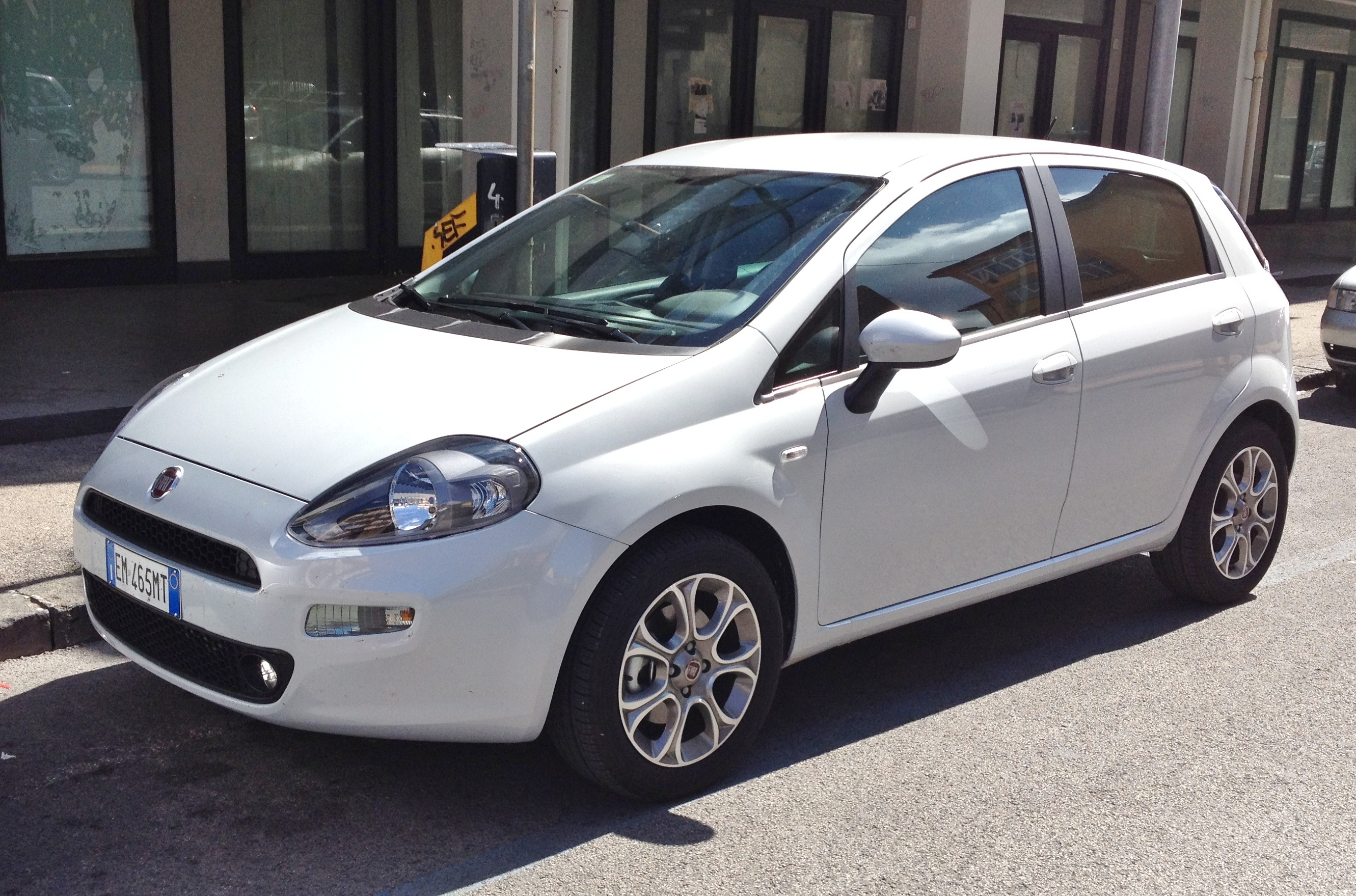
Fiat Punto. As of May 2013, nearly nine million units had been sold globally.

The 1970s and 1980s were a time of great change for the car industry in Europe. Rear-wheel drive, particularly on family cars, gradually gave way to front-wheel drive. The hatchback bodystyle, first seen on the Renault 16 from France in 1965, became the most popular bodystyle on smaller cars by the mid-1980s. Fiat moved into the hatchback market at the small car end in 1971 with the 127 hatchback, followed by the Ritmo family car in 1978. By the end of the decade, the more upmarket Alfa Romeo and Lancia marques had also added hatchbacks to their ranges. The Italian motor industry's flair for innovative design continued in the 1980s, with its Uno supermini (1983) and Tipo family hatchback (1988) both being voted European Car of the Year mostly in recognition of their up-to-date and practical designs. The Uno was one of the most popular cars in Europe throughout its production life, although the Tipo was not so popular outside Italy.

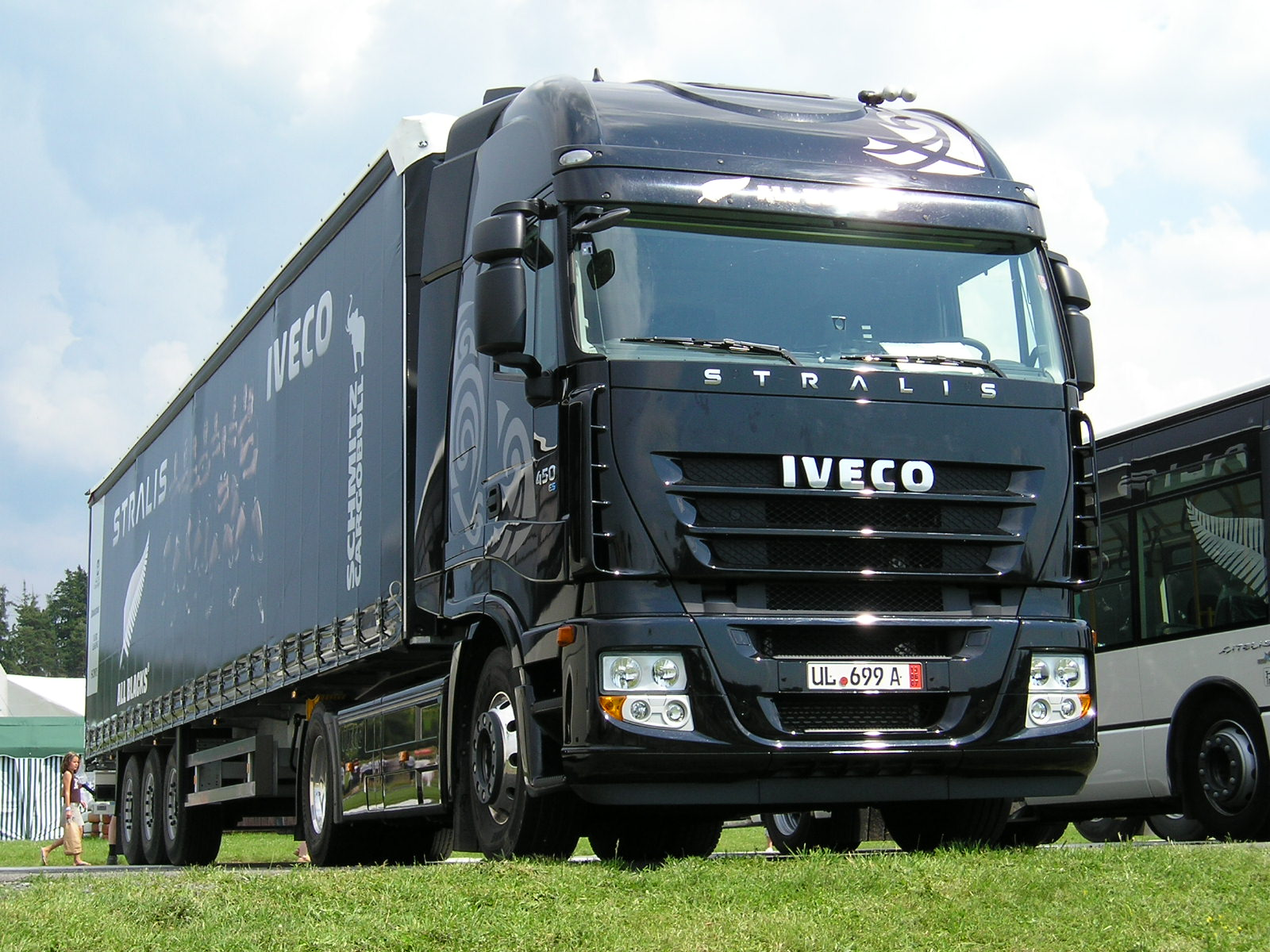
A 2007 Iveco Stralis

Iveco is an Italian multinational transport vehicle manufacturing company with headquarters in Turin, Italy. It designs and builds light, medium, and heavy commercial vehicles. The name IVECO first appeared in 1975 after a merger of Italian, French, and German brands. Its production plants are in Europe, China, Russia, Australia and Latin America and it has about 5,000 sales and service outlets in over 160 countries. The worldwide output of the company amounts to around 150,000 commercial vehicles with a turnover of about €10 billion.

The Uno's replacement, the Punto, was launched at the end of 1993 and achieved success similar to that of its predecessor, while its earlier Cinquecento played a big part in boosting the size of the city car sector in Europe during the 1990s. Fiat entered the new compact MPV market in 1998 with the quirky six-seater Multipla, having already entered the full size MPV market halfway through the decade with the Eurovan as part of a joint venture with Peugeot.

In the 1990s, the Italian auto industry again was 3rd in Europe and 5th in World with an annual output near 2 million (with 2,220,774 maximum in 1989). In 2011, however, it fell below 800,000 for the first time in half a century and is now 6th place in Europe and 19st place in the World.

Pagani Automobili is a manufacturer of sports cars and carbon fiber components. The company was founded in 1992 by Argentine businessman and engineer Horacio Pagani and is based in San Cesario sul Panaro, near Modena, Italy. Horacio Pagani, who formerly created and managed Lamborghini's composites department, founded Pagani Composite Research in 1988. This new company worked with Lamborghini on numerous projects, including the restyling of the Lamborghini Countach 25th Anniversary Edition, the Lamborghini LM002, the P140 design concept, and the Diablo. In the late 1980s, Pagani began designing his own car, then referred to as the "C8 Project". Pagani planned to rename the C8 the "Fangio F1" to honour his friend, the Argentine five-time Formula One champion, Juan Manuel Fangio.

Italy today remains one of the significant players of car design and technology, and Fiat has large investments outside Italy including a 100% stake in the American automaker Chrysler as of January 2014. Fiat's fortunes have been helped since 2007 by the huge success across Europe of its new Fiat 500 city car, although the 500 is manufactured in Poland and Mexico, rather than in Italy.

Over the decades, the Italian automotive industry has been almost totally dominated by the Fiat Group, which later became Fiat Chrysler Automobiles in 2014; in 2001 over 90% of vehicles were produced by Fiat. From 1 January 2021, the FCA group becomes part of the Dutch company Stellantis.

== Automobile museums ==
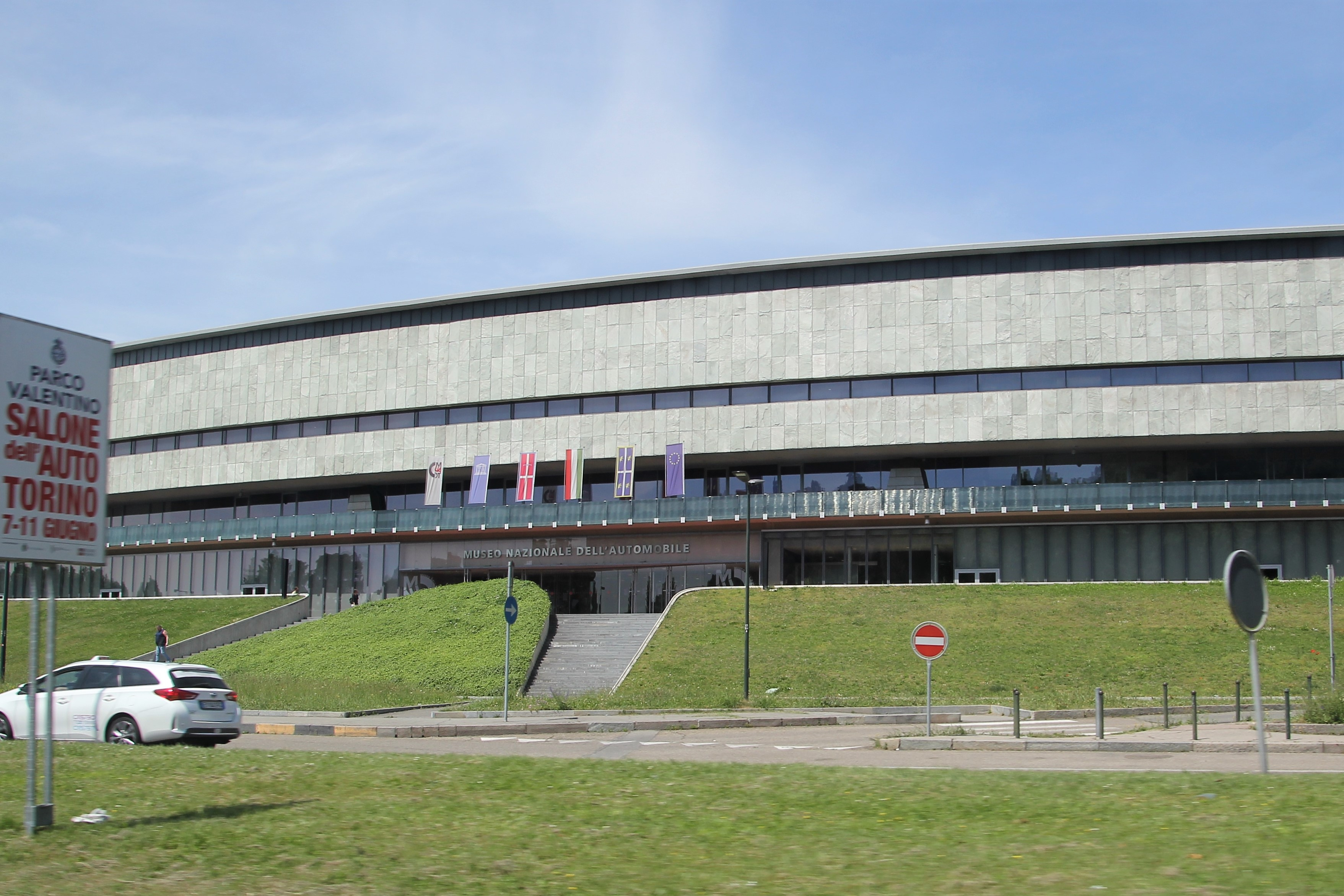
Museo Nazionale dell'Automobile ('National Automobile Museum') in Turin

The Museo Nazionale dell'Automobile ('National Automobile Museum'), known as MAUTO, is an automobile museum in Turin, Italy, founded by Carlo Biscaretti di Ruffia. The museum has a collection of almost 200 cars among eighty automobile brands representing eight countries (Italy, France, Great Britain, Germany, Netherlands, Spain, United States of America, Poland). The museum is situated in a building dating from 1960, and it has three floors. After restructuring in 2011 the museum is open again, and its exhibition area has been expanded from 11,000 square metres (120,000 sq ft) to 19,000 square metres (200,000 sq ft). The museum also has its own library, documentation centre, bookshop and auditorium. The museum's collection includes the first Italian cars, a Bernardi from 1896 and a Fiat from 1899, a Rolls-Royce Silver Ghost from 1914, and racing cars by Ferrari and Alfa Romeo. Also included are for instance an 1893 Benz Victoria, an 1894 Peugeot, a 1904 Oldsmobile, the 1907 Itala from the Peking to Paris race, a 1913 De Dion-Bouton, a 1916 Ford T and the 1929 Isotta Fraschini Tipo 8A that starred in Sunset Boulevard.

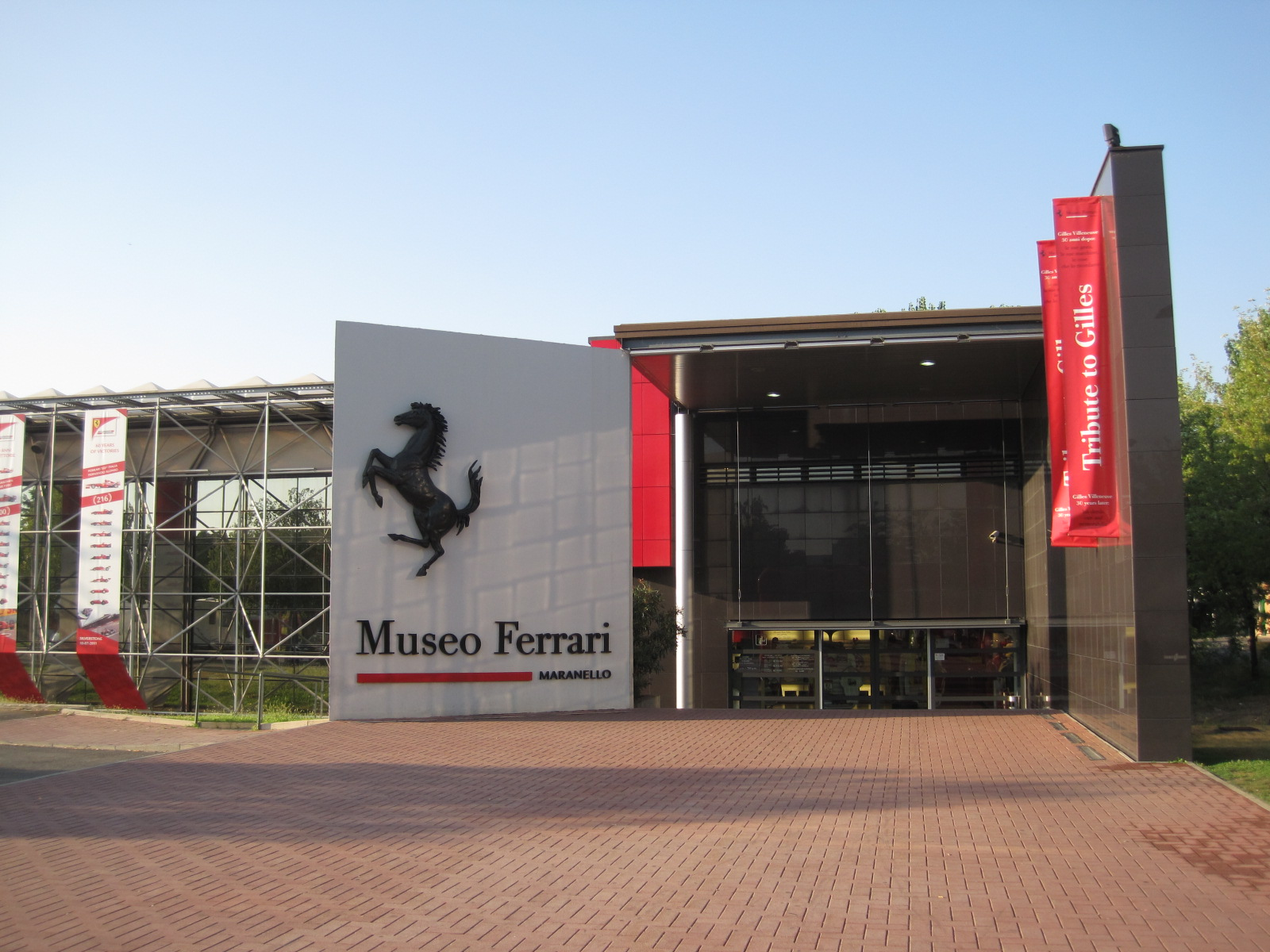
Museo Ferrari in Maranello

Museo Ferrari is a Ferrari company museum dedicated to the Ferrari sports car marque. The museum is not purely for cars; there are also trophies, photographs and other historical objects relating to the Italian motor racing industry. In addition to that, the exhibition introduces technological innovations, some of which had made the transition from racing cars to road cars. It is located just 300 m (980 ft) from the Ferrari factory in Ferrari's home town of Maranello, near Modena, Italy. The museum first opened in February 1990, with a new wing being added in October 2004. Ferrari itself has run the museum since 1995. The total surface area is now 2,500 square metres. The number of annual visitors to the museum is around 180,000. The exhibits are mostly a combination of Ferrari road and track cars.

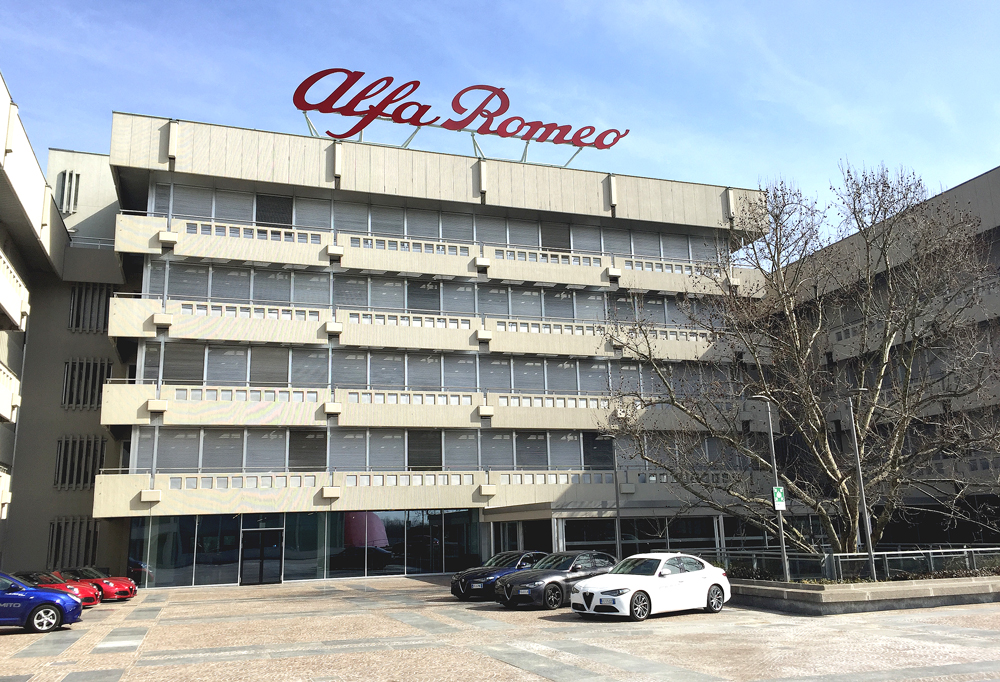
Museo Alfa Romeo in Arese

Museo Alfa Romeo ('Alfa Romeo Historical Museum') is Alfa Romeo's official museum, located in Arese (Milan), and displaying a permanent collection of Alfa Romeo cars and engines. After being closed down in 2011, the museum reopened in June 2015. The museum was officially inaugurated on 18 December 1976, and is located in the former Alfa Romeo Arese factory area. Production of cars ended in 2002 and engine production in 2006 in Arese factory complex. At the beginning of 2009 the museum was closed down a first time for renovations and opened in the end of the year, to celebrate Alfa Romeo's 100th birthday in 2010. It was closed once more in February 2011, reportedly for renovation work again. The renovation project was laid down at the end of 2013, and restoration work only started in Summer 2014. Centerpiece of the renewed structure are Alfa red projecting roofs added to the original 1970s structure. After four years the Museum officially reopened on 24 June 2015, when it hosted the press unveiling of the all-new Alfa Romeo Giulia and Alfa Romeo logo, both key steps in the relaunch of the brand. On 30 June 2015 the museum reopened to the public. The museum is dedicated to over 100 years of history of the Alfa Romeo marque, whose production included automobiles, commercial vehicles, railway locomotives, tractors, buses, trams, marine and aircraft engines. The museum spreads over 4,800 square metres (52,000 sq ft). Its six floors are divided into four theme areas, including a historical review of all Alfa Romeo road cars produced since 1910, prototypes and dream cars, aircraft and aeronautical projects, and scale models and awards. The museum collection numbers over 250 cars and 150 engines, of which approximately half were on display. These included at least one example of each model produced, plus prototypes and racing cars. Some of the museum cars are regularly on loan for festivals and historical events, like Pebble Beach Concours d'Elegance, the Goodwood Festival of Speed and Mille Miglia.

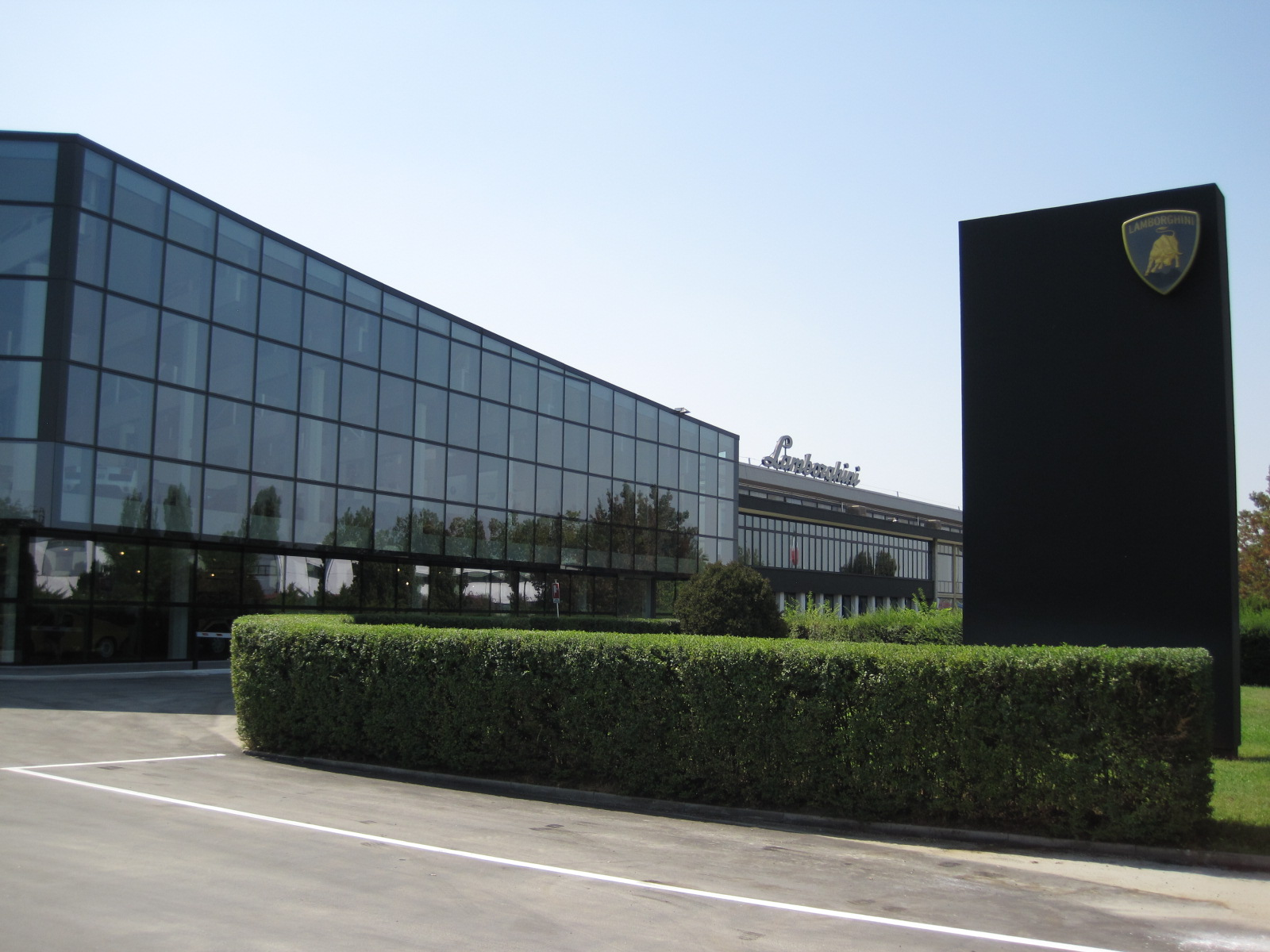
Museo Lamborghini in Sant'Agata Bolognese

The Museo Lamborghini ('Lamborghini Museum') is an automobile museum owned and operated by Automobili Lamborghini S.p.A. in Sant'Agata Bolognese, Emilia-Romagna, Italy. The two-storey museum opened in 2001, and was renovated in June 2016 to provide exhibit space for more models. The goal of the museum is to cover all major milestones in the Lamborghini's history. For this purpose, the museum displays a family tree that shows all the models ever produced by the company. The current gallery contains supercars such as the 350 GT and the Sesto Elemento, and one-off and concept cars such as the Veneno and the Miura concept.

The Museo Mille Miglia is an automobile museum founded on 10 November 2004 at the initiative of the Automobile Club of Brescia and of some private enthusiasts of the famous Mille Miglia race. It is located in the ancient monastery of St. Euphemia in Via delle Rimembranze in Brescia, and more precisely on the outside of the neighborhood is Saint Euphemia. The route is divided into nine sections of time, seven dedicated to the Mille Miglia races from 1927 to 1957, one at Mille Miglia from 1958 to 1961 and one at the Mille Miglia contemporanea, and in each of these sections there are historic cars, periodically replaced to allow their participation in various historic car racing, including Mille Miglia.

Lancia Museum (on Italian: Museo Vincenzo Lancia) is a museum of the Lancia family and the car brand Lancia. The museum is located in Fobello, Italy. Inaugurated on 20 September 2009, the exhibition is on the second floor of the Palazzo Giuseppe Lancia that Vincenzo Lancia himself built as a school building. The museum is established in the honor of the great engineer Vincenzo Lancia. In the house there are photographs, family trees and documents connected with the family. The museum is divided into four rooms that each carry the name of a well-known Lancia model: Augusta, Artena, Astura and Aprilia.

Museo Casa Enzo Ferrari is a museum in Modena focused on the life and work of Enzo Ferrari, the founder of the Ferrari sports car marque. The museum complex includes two separate buildings, a former house and workshop that belonged to Enzo Ferrari's father, and a new building designed by the architectural practice Future Systems. The new 6,000 square metres (65,000 sq ft) building houses, in a large gallery, a permanent exhibition displaying some of the most noteworthy Ferrari automobiles, including rare cars of the 1950s, Formula One race cars and more recent sports cars. The museum exhibition gallery was substantially renewed and updated in February 2014. The exhibits feature Ferrari, Alfa Romeo and Maserati cars and also a large video-projection depicting the life of Enzo Ferrari.

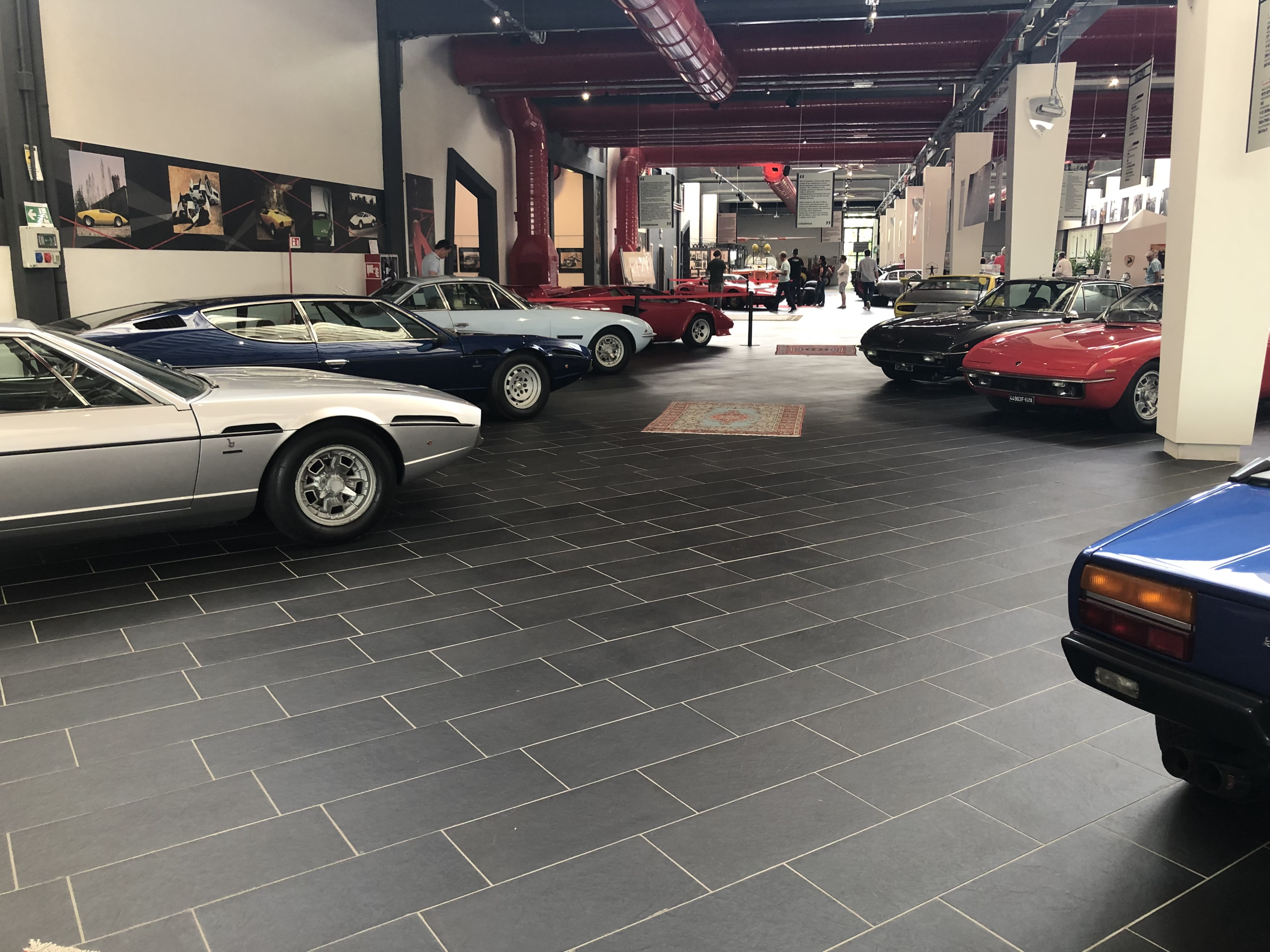
Museo Ferruccio Lamborghini in Argelato

Museo Ferruccio Lamborghini is an Italian museum in Argelato, a few kilometres from the centre of Bologna, Emilia-Romagna, focused on the life and work of Ferruccio Lamborghini, the founder of the Lamborghini sports car marque. It has recently been relocated from its first Ferrarese site (Dosso di S. Agostino) to a new site located in a former Lamborghini factory in Argelato. In 1995, the first Ferruccio Lamborghini Museum was inaugurated next to the Lamborghini Calor plant, nestled in the Ferrara countryside birthplace of Ferruccio Lamborghini. After 19 years and thousands of visitors from all over the world, his son, Antonio (Tonino) Lamborghini, with the entrepreneurial spirit and avant-garde character that distinguishes his every project, decided to bring the Museum closer to the city of Bologna and to give more emphasis to the history of his father, the genius of mechanics and Cavaliere del Lavoro, dedicating him a new exhibition space. It collects all the industrial productions of the Doctor of Engineering (Hon. Causa) Lamborghini, from the first Carioca tractor which started his company in 1947 to the sports cars of the 1950s, 1960s, and 1970s. Ferruccio Lamborghini's personal collection in the museum includes the Miura SV, the Fiat Barchetta Sport, modified to participate in the 1948 Mille Miglia competition, the Countach, the Jarama models, the Urraco and the Espada.

== Production figures ==
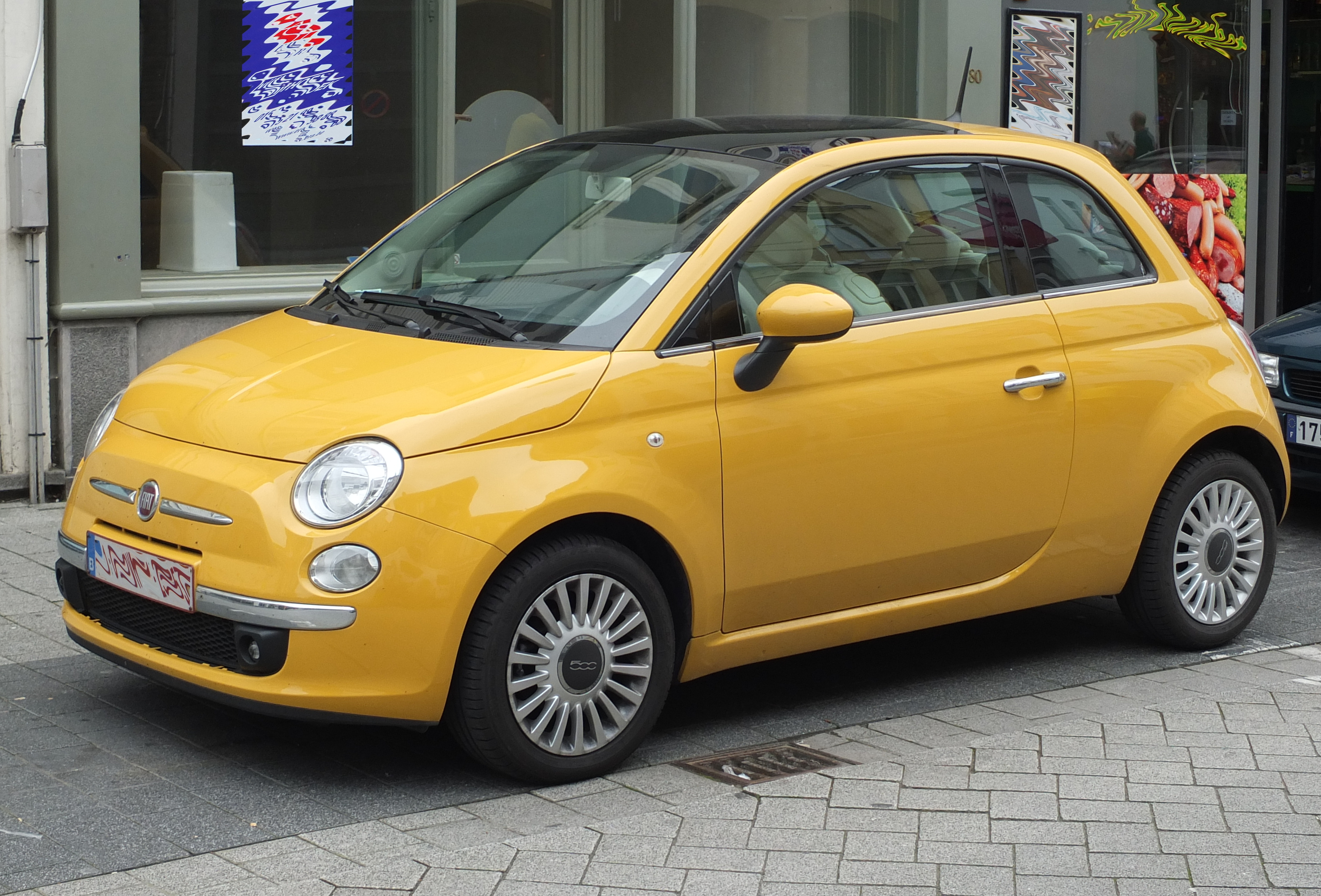
Fiat Nuova 500, 2008 European Car of the Year, 2009 World Car Design of the Year

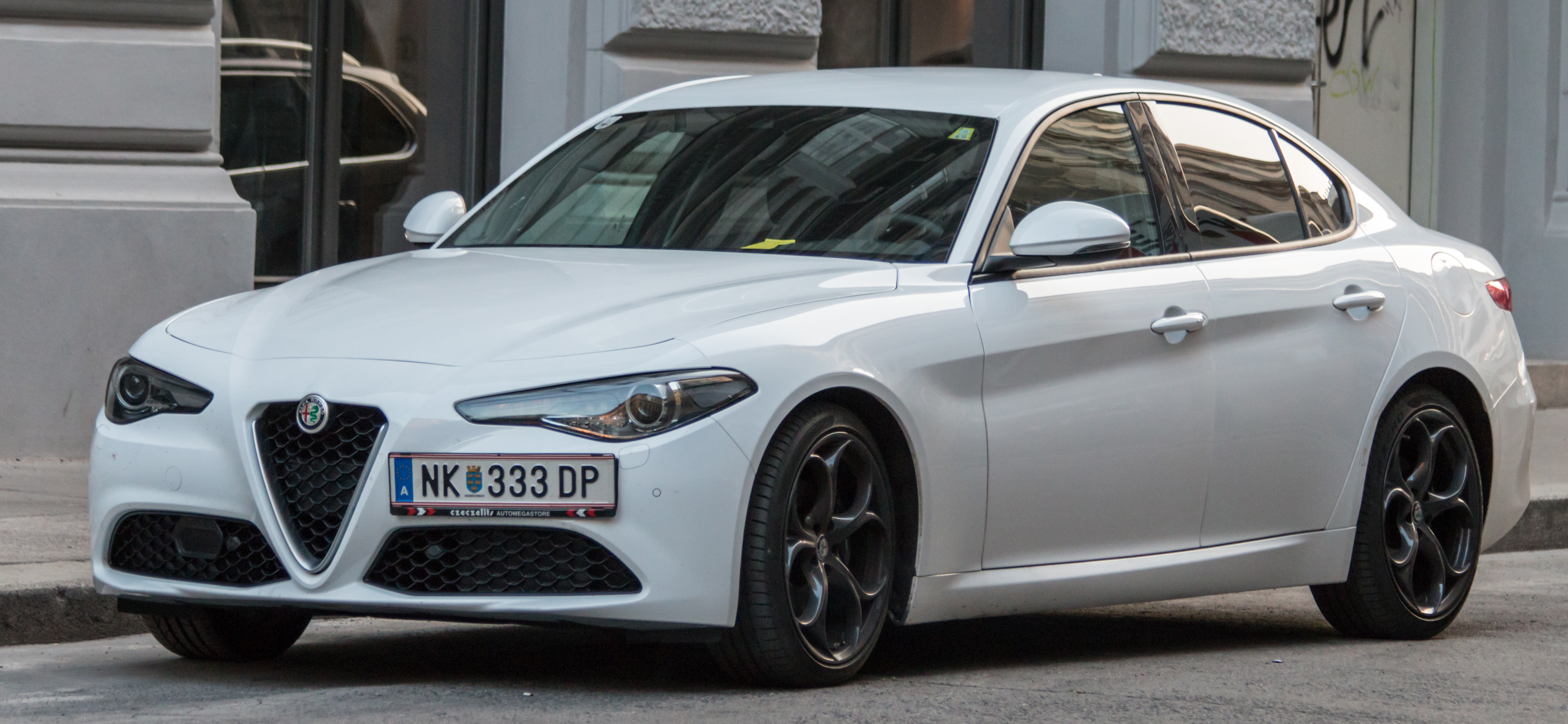
Alfa Romeo Giulia was second in 2017 European Car of the Year voting and was named Motor Trend Car of the Year for 2018. In 2018, Giulia was awarded the Compasso d'Oro industrial design award.

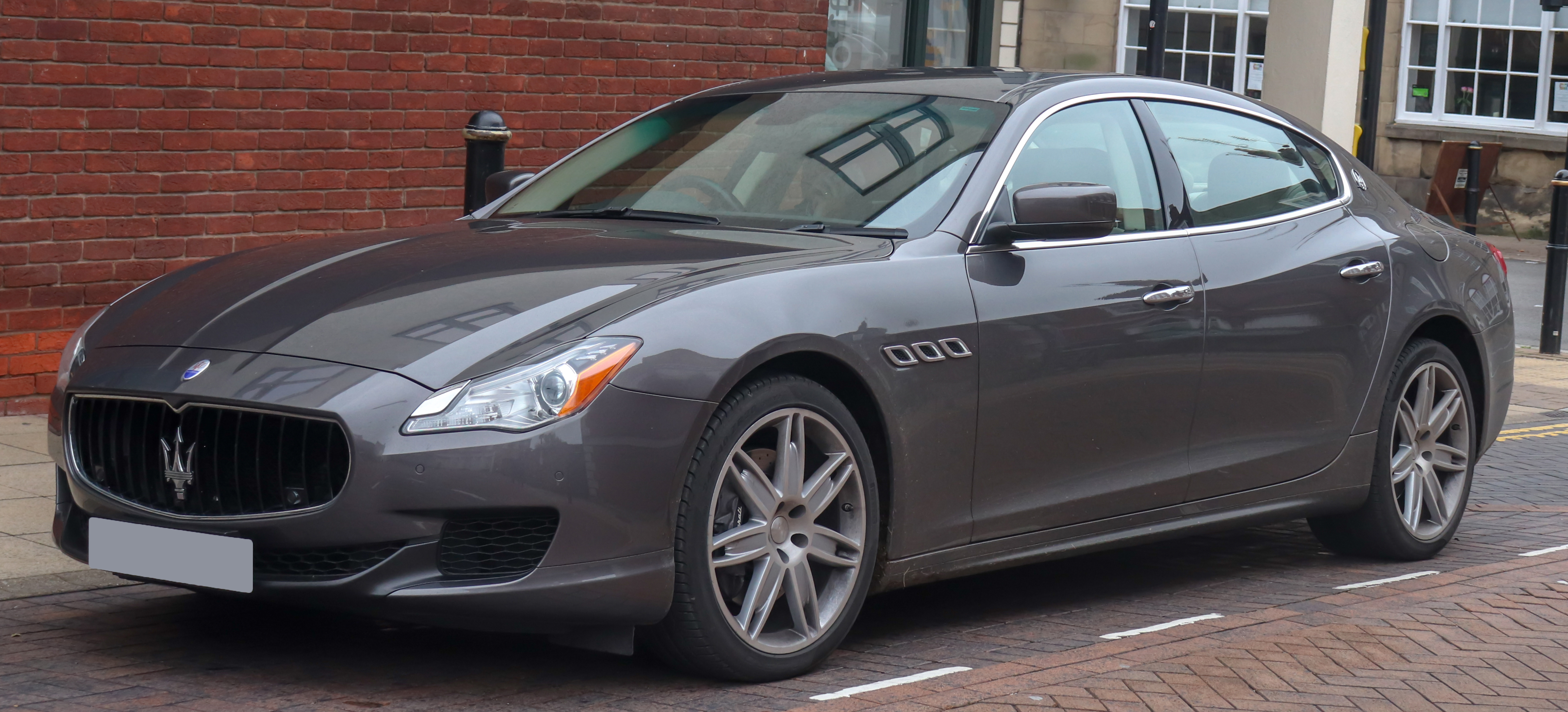
Maserati Quattroporte, a four-door luxury sports sedan

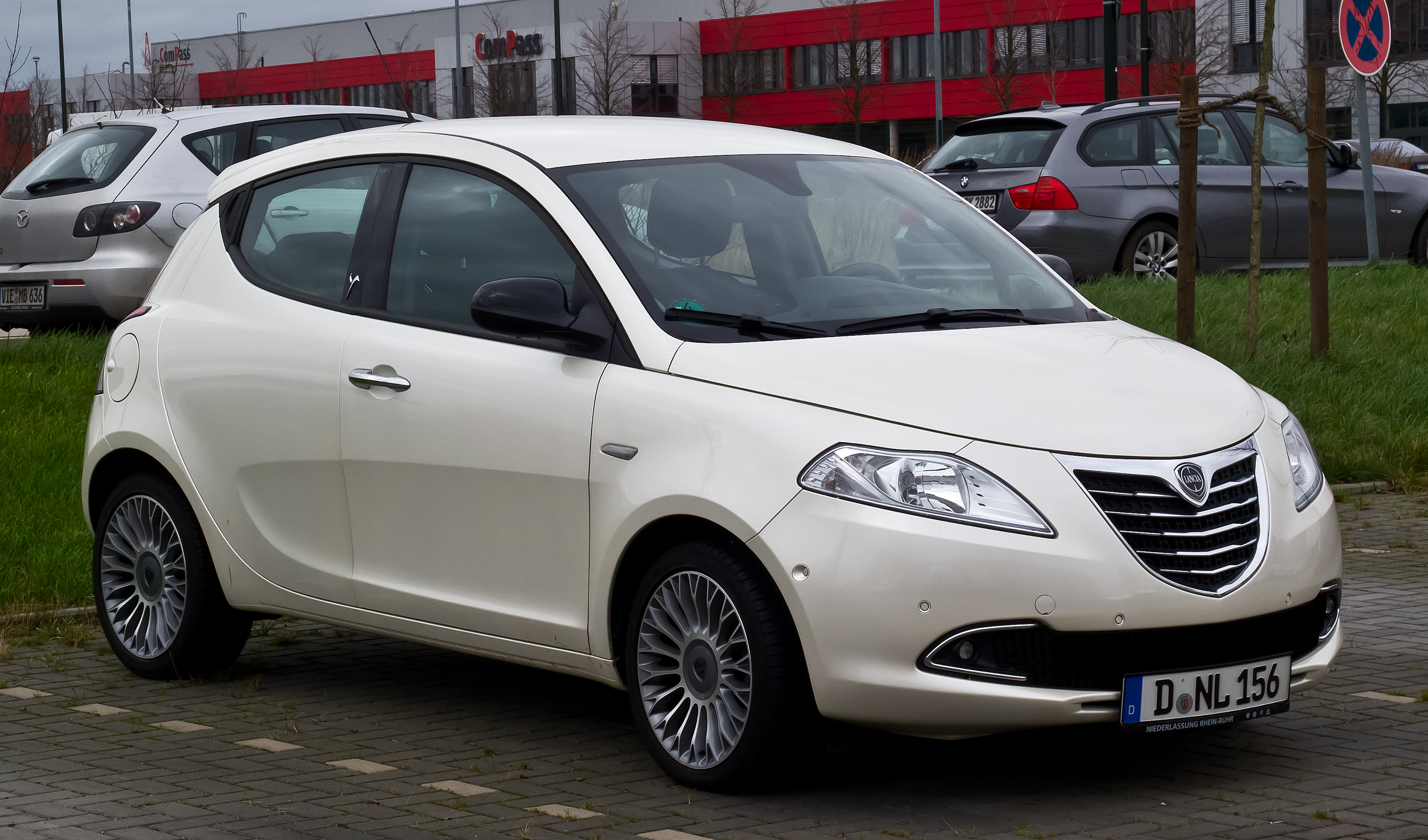
Lancia Ypsilon. Between 1995 and 2005, Lancia produced more than 870,000 Ypsilons in the Melfi plant in the Potenza region.

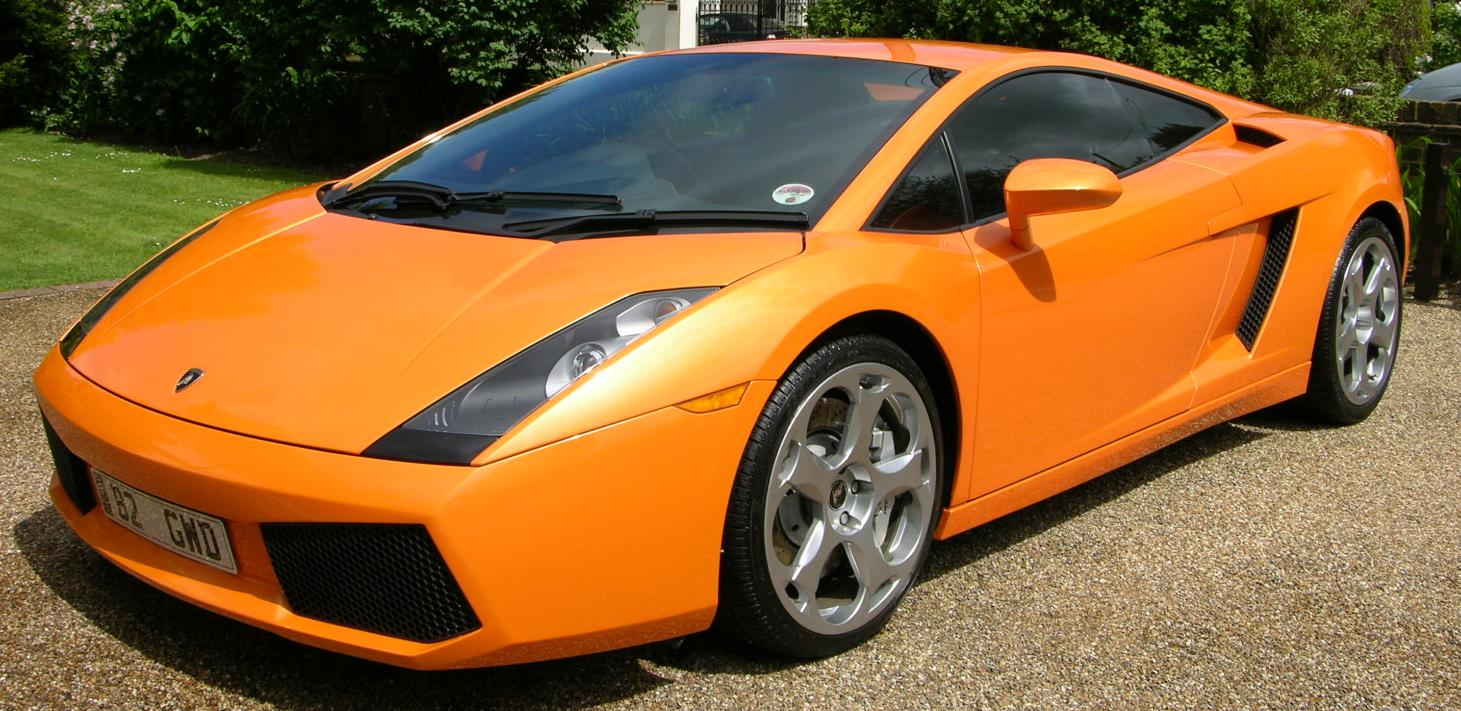
Lamborghini Gallardo, bestselling Lamborghini in history

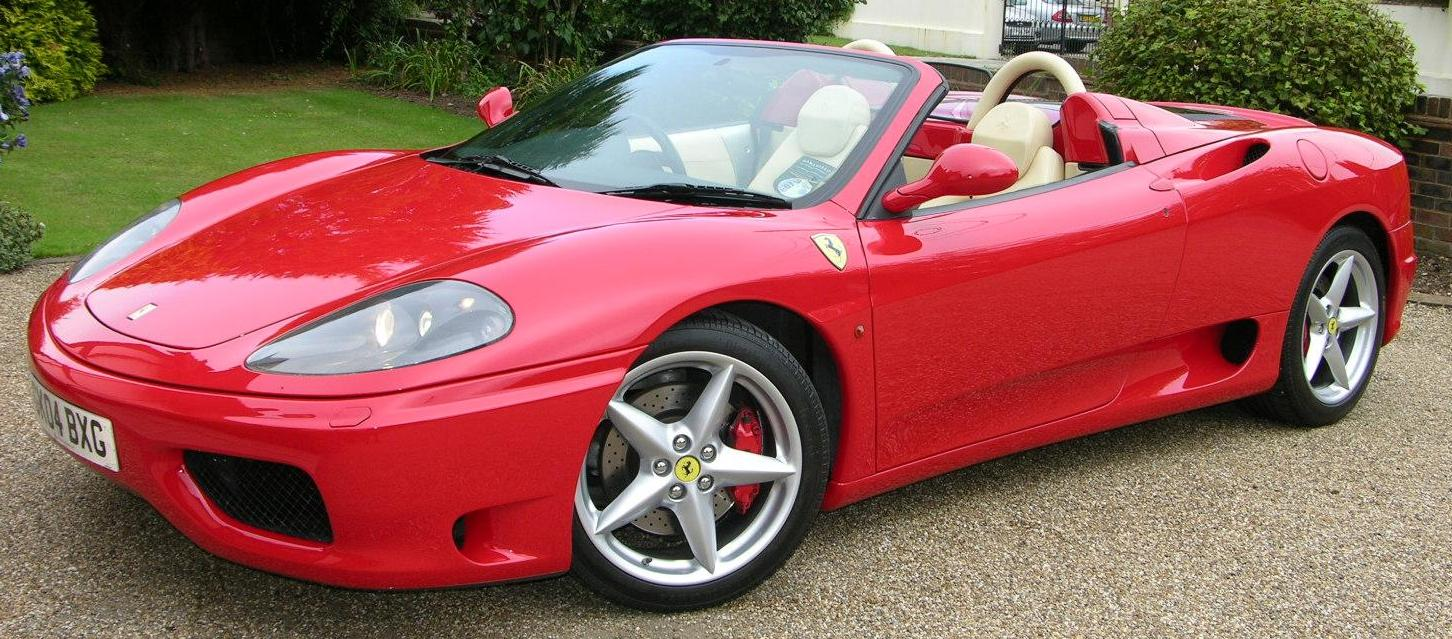
Ferrari 360, bestselling Ferrari in history

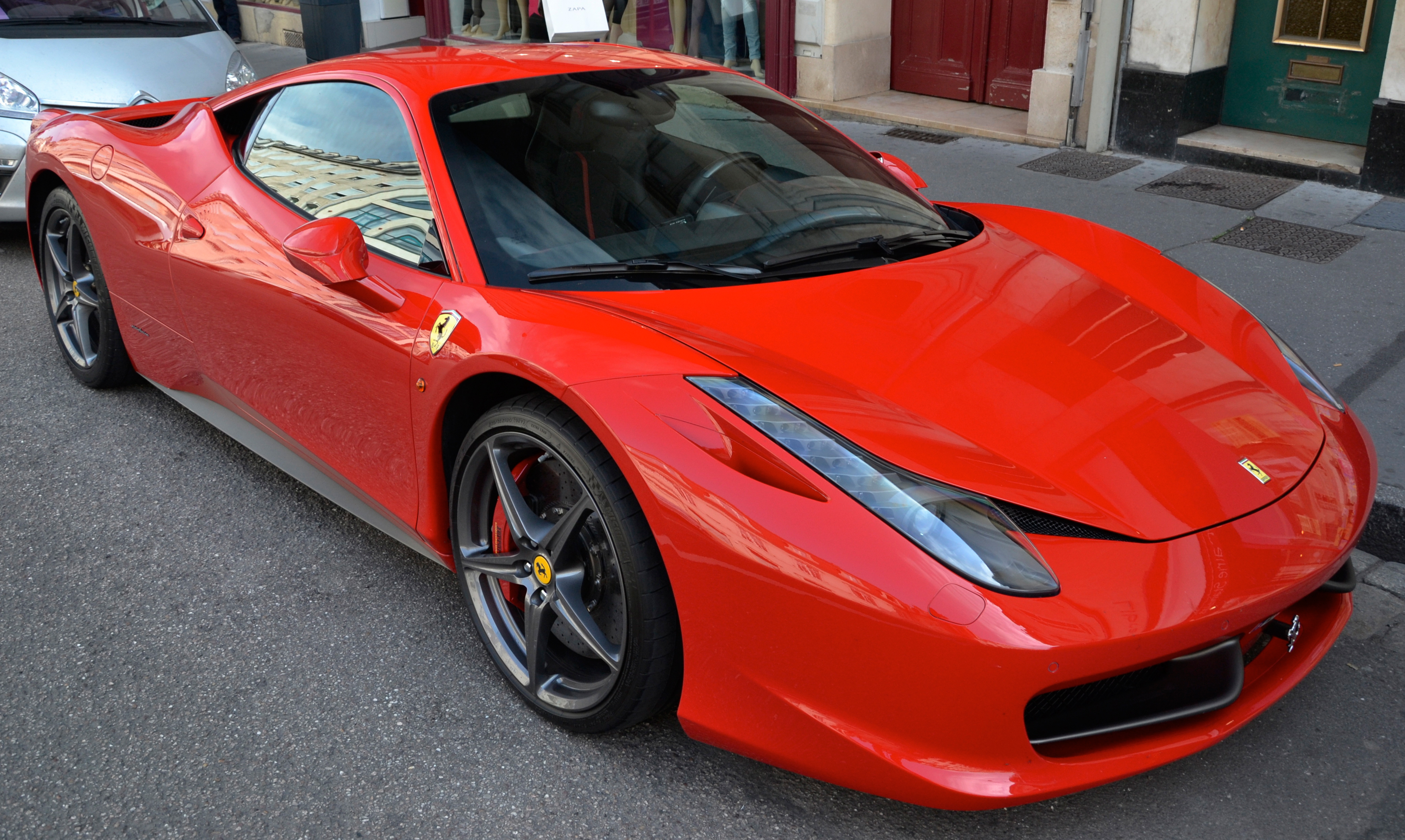
Ferrari 458 Italia, 2011 World Performance Car

Italian motor vehicle production:

Year	Units
1913	2,000
1924	35,000
1928	55,000
1929	33,436
1931	15,000
1934	30,000
1935	44,000
1936	20,000
1937	34,208
1938	38,765
1948	33,000
1949	48,883
1950	129,000
1960	645,000
1961	759,000
1970	1,854,252
1971	1,817,000
1980	1,610,287
1981	1,433,000
1989	2,220,774
1990	2,120,850
1991	1,878,000
1994	1,534,000
1995	1,667,000
1996	1,545,000
1997	1,827,592
1998	1,692,737
1999	1,704,326
2000	1,741,478
2001	1,581,908
2002	1,429,678
2003	1,324,481
2004	1,145,181
2005	1,038,352
2006	1,211,594
2007	1,284,312
2008	1,023,774
2009	843,239
2010	838,400
2011	790,348
2012	671,768
2013	658,206
2014	697,864
2015	1,014,223
2016	1,103,516
2017	1,142,210
2018	1,060,068
2019	915,305
2020	777,057
2021	797,243
2022	796,394
2023	880,085
2024	591,067

== Manufacturers ==
=== Current manufacturers ===
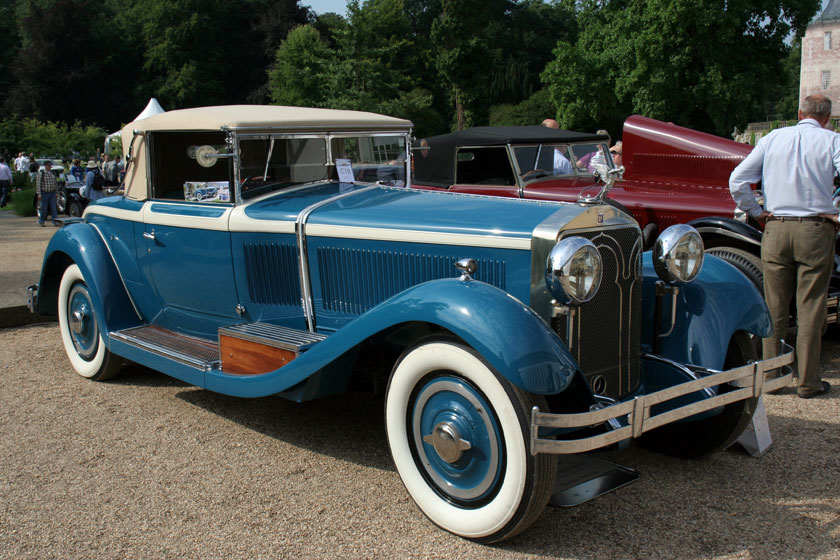
Isotta Fraschini Tipo 8A

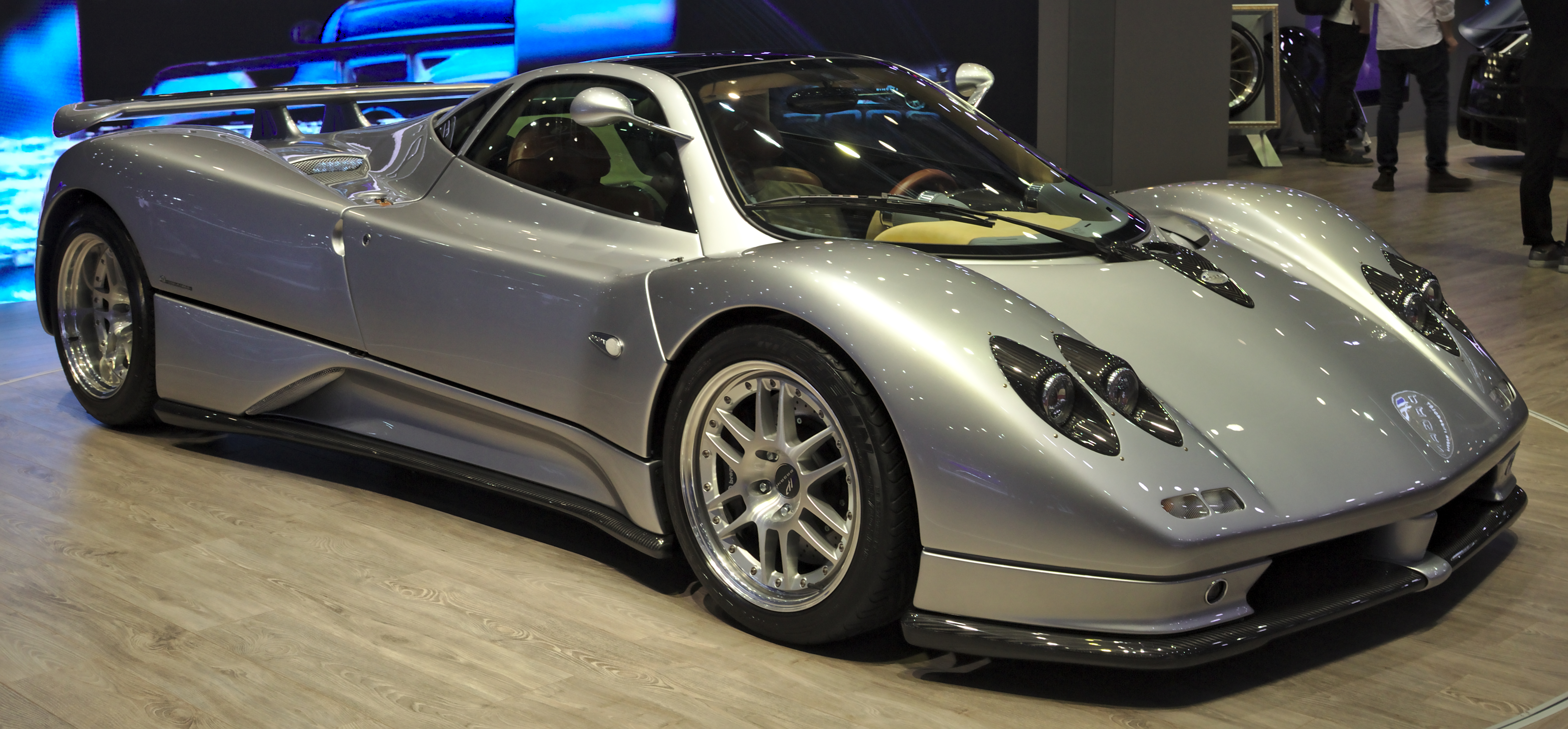
Pagani Zonda

Italian current automobile manufacturers include:

- Abarth
- Alfa Romeo
- ARES Design
- Astra Veicoli Industriali
- B. Engineering
- DR Motor
- Estrema
- Ferrari
- Fiat
- Fornasari
- Casalini
- Iveco
- Isotta Fraschini
- Italdesign Giugiaro
- Lamborghini
- Lancia
- Manifattura Automobili Torino
- Maserati
- Mazzanti
- Pagani
- Piaggio
- Pininfarina
- Zagato

=== Defunct manufacturers ===
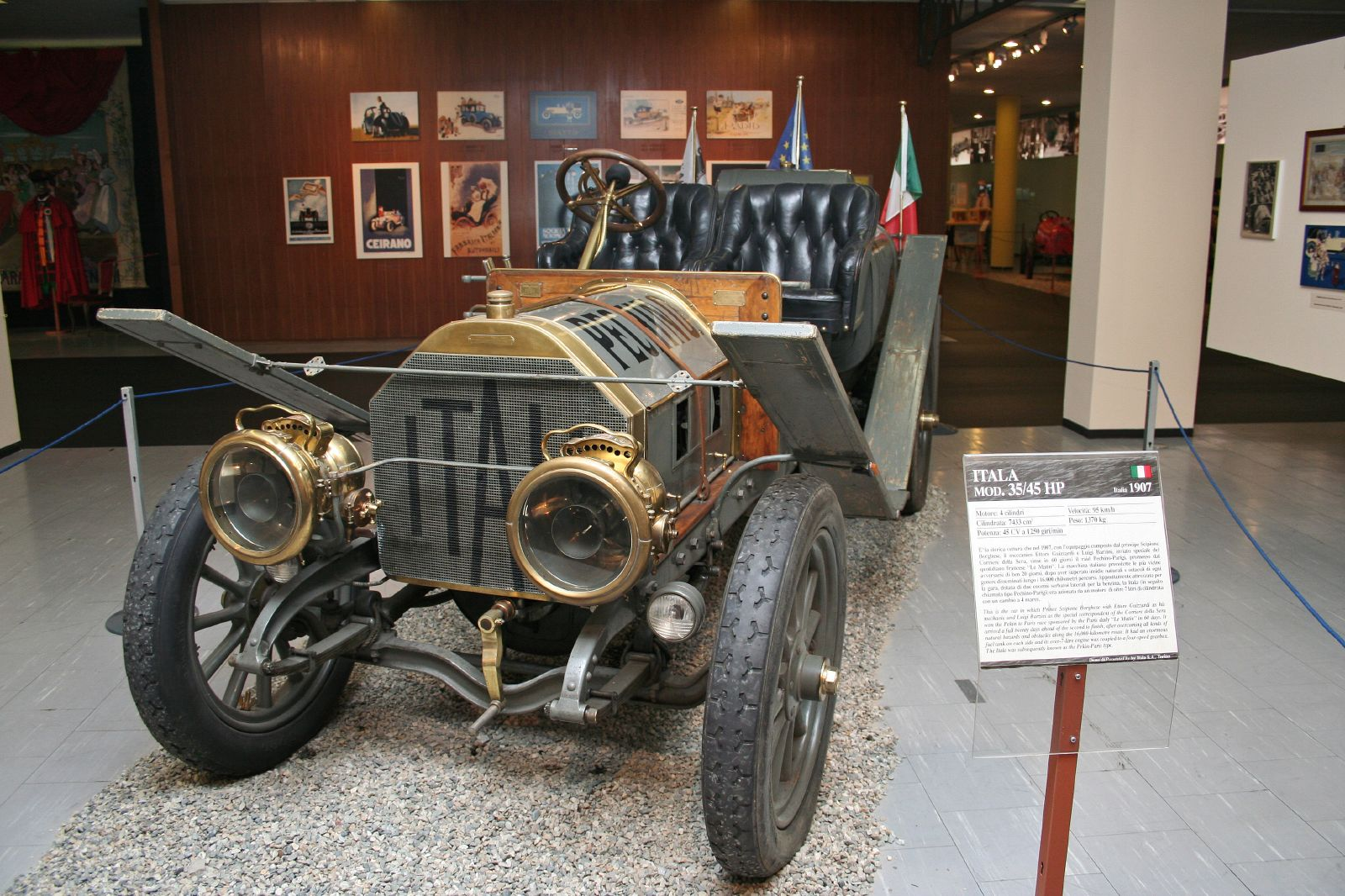
The Itala mod. 35/45 HP at the Museo Nazionale dell'Automobile in Turin, became famous for the victory at the Peking to Paris.

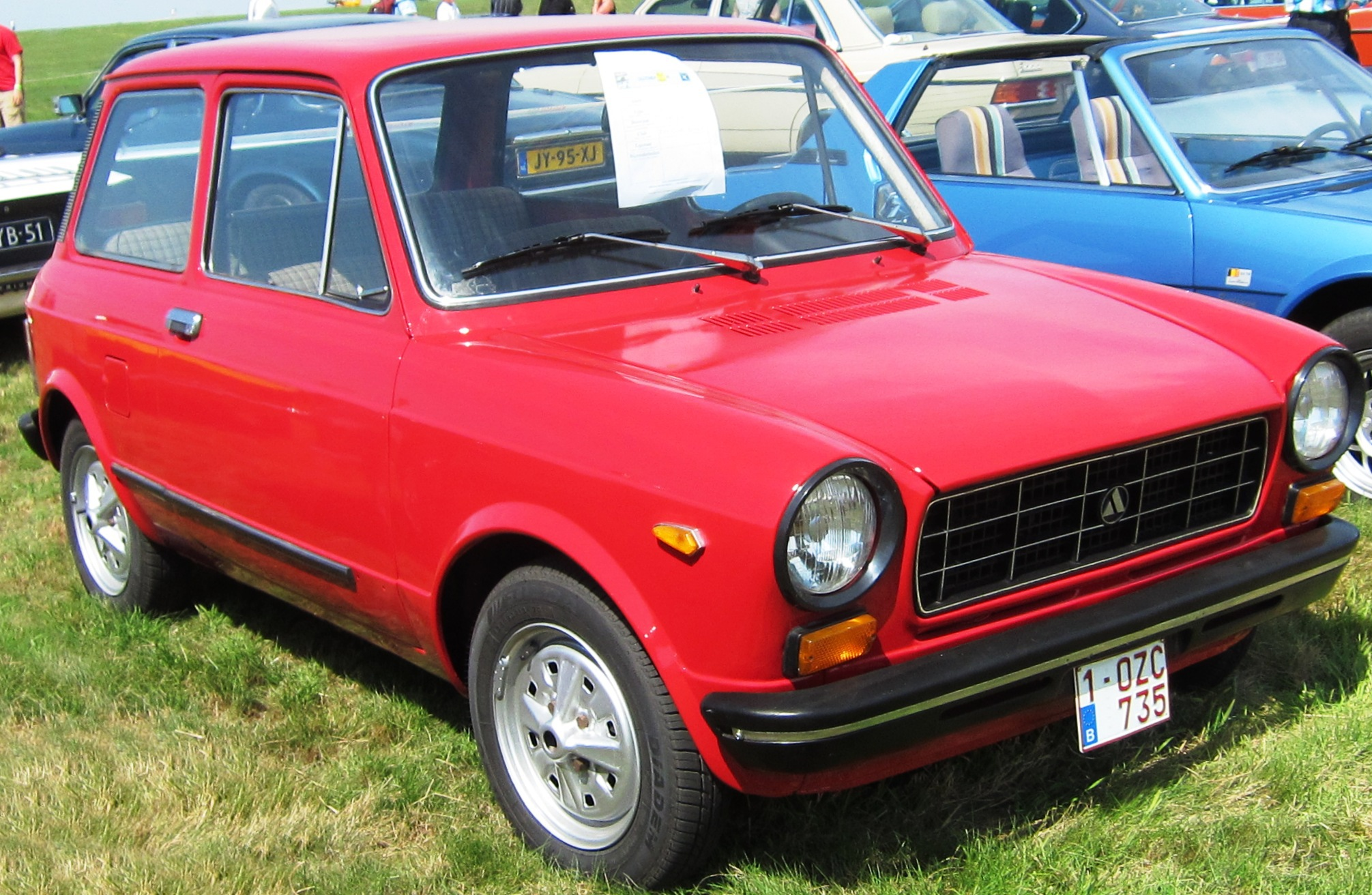
Autobianchi A112

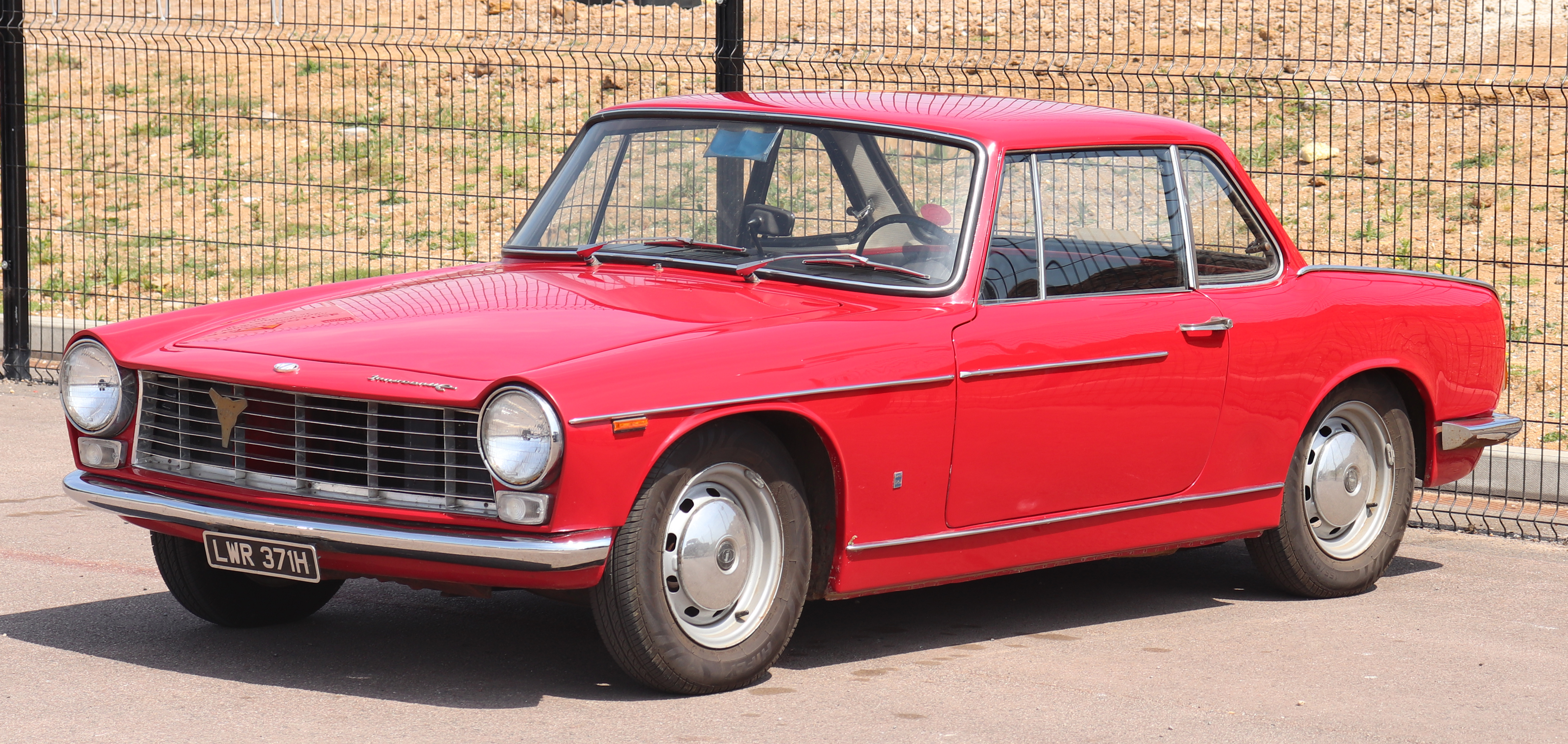
Innocenti C coupe

Defunct manufacturers:

- APIS
- Aquila
- Amilcar Italiana
- Ansaldi
- Ansaldo
- Aurea
- ATS
- ASA
- Autobianchi
- Bandini
- Bertone
- Bianchi
- Bizzarrini
- Brixia-Zust
- Ceirano
- Ceirano GB & C
- Fratelli Ceirano & C.
- Ceirano Junior & C.
- Ceirano Fabbrica Automobili or Giovanni Ceirano Fabbrica Automobili
- Chiribiri
- Cisitalia
- Cizeta
- Colli
- CMN
- De Tomaso
- De Vecchi
- Diatto
- Fabrica Anonima Torinese Automobili (FATA)
- FOD
- Fabbrica Ligure Automobili Genova (FLAG)
- Florentia
- Ghia
- Gecav
- IENA
- Innocenti
- Intermeccanica
- Iso
- Itala
- Maggiora
- Martin
- Moretti
- Ufficine Nardi
- OM
- Osca
- OSI
- Qvale
- Società Torinese Automobili Rapid (S.T.A.R.) badged as Rapid
- S.C.A.T. (SCAT)
- S.C.A.T.-Ceirano
- Serenissima
- Siata
- S.P.A. (SPA)
- Stanguellini
- S.T.A.R. - badged as Rapid
- Storero
- Zust

== See also ==
- List of Italian companies
- List of automobile companies founded by the Ceirano brothers
