= Lambretta Special X =

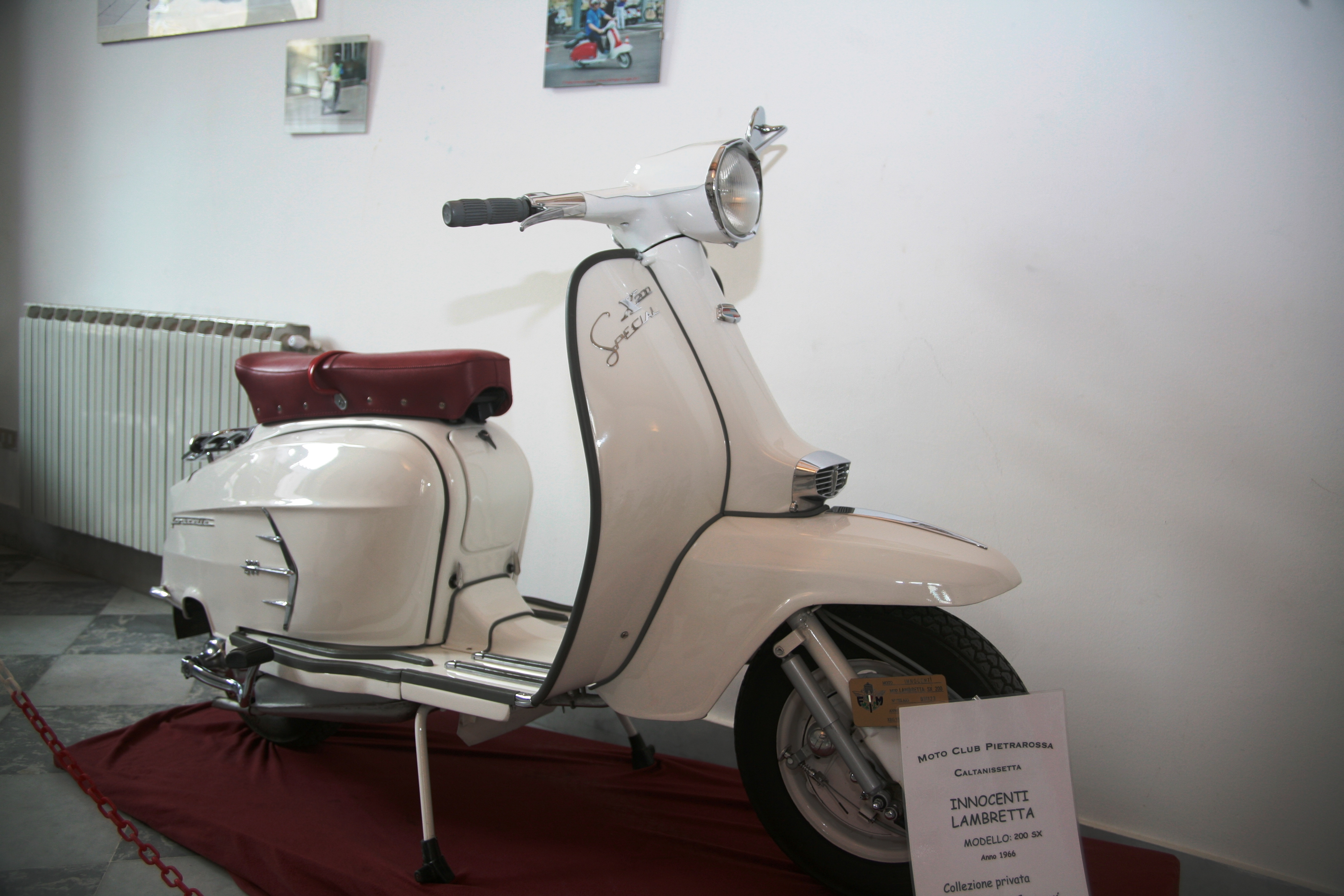
- Lambretta SX200
- Manufacturer: Lambretta
- Production: 150: October 1966 – January 1969; 200: January 1966 – January 1969
- Predecessor: Lambretta TV200
- Successor: Lambretta GP/DL
- Class: Scooter
- Engine: 148 cc (9.0 cu in), two-stroke, single 198 cc (12.1 cu in), two-stroke, single
- Bore / stroke: 150: 62 mm × 58 mm (2.4 in × 2.3 in); 200: 66 mm × 58 mm (2.6 in × 2.3 in)
- Top speed: 150: 56 mph (90 km/h); 200: 66 mph (106 km/h)
- Power: 150: 9.38 hp (7 kW; 10 PS); 200: 11 hp (8 kW; 11 PS)
- Transmission: 4-Speed, handlebar twist grip, manual, chain final drive
- Frame type: Tubular
- Suspension: Front: Telescopic forks Rear: Shock absorber
- Brakes: 150: front and rear drums 200: front disc, rear drum
- Tyres: 3.50*10
- Dimensions: L: 1,800 mm (71 in); W: 700 mm (28 in); H: 1,030 mm (41 in)
- Weight: 150: 120 kg (265 lb); 200: 123 kg (271 lb) (dry)
- Fuel capacity: 8.3 L (1.8 imp gal; 2.2 US gal)
- Fuel consumption: 150: 93 mpg_{‑imp} (3.0 L/100 km; 77 mpg_{‑US}); 200: 93 mpg_{‑imp} (3.0 L/100 km; 77 mpg_{‑US})

The Lambretta Special X (SX), is a production scooter made by Innocenti Lambretta from 1966 to 1969. It replaced the Li Special 150 and TV200.

== History ==
The project Special X was an attempt have a model more of a quality look the Lambretta had been known for. The models slogan was 'SX Appeal' and came in two variants SX150 and SX200 replacing the Li Special 150 and TV200 respectively with the Li Special 125 staying in production while the TV175 ended production. They came on the market at prices between 184,000 and 219,000 Italian lira. The SX150 was revealed to media on 26 November 1966 by the Innocenti workshop in Lambrate, Milan. The SX200 was a favoured by scooter racers due to its increased speed and better handling, many SX200s ended up in the United Kingdom due to the 1960s racing scene.

=== Production ===
The SX150 had a total Italian production of 31,328 while the SX200 had 20,783.

== Design ==
=== SX150 ===
==== Mark I ====
The SX150 was a revamp of the Li Special 150 the changes were that the paintwork was no longer metallic, a chrome horn casting grill and a chrome flash were added on the horn casting and front mudguard respectively. The bike kept the Li Special body work with the octagonal headset and squared off front mudguard as well as the side panels with the two rear 'finger flashes'. The engine and gear ratios were modified to gain more speed over the Li150 Special by modifying the ports, this gave the bike 9.38 hp and a top speed of 56 mph.

==== Mark II ====
In early 1968, the badge on the horn casting was changed to a rectangle one, the front forks had press in bump stops and the glove box was changed to grey plastic.

==== Mark III ====
In late 1968 panel handles were removed and replaced with Lambretta GP/DL style clips.

=== SX200 ===
==== Mark I ====
The SX200 had new side panels with a single larger more pointed 'arrow' flash. It came with a front disc brake and dampers as standard. The engine was more heavily modified for the SX200 over the TV200 reaching 11 hp.

==== Mark II ====
As with the SX150 in early 1968 the badge on the horn casting was changed to a rectangle one, the front forks had press in bump stops and the glove box was changed to grey plastic.

==== Mark III ====
As with the SX150 in late 1968 panel handles were changed the GP/DL style clips, but the SX200 also gained a polished horn grill and the chrome flash like the SX150 model.

=== Colour scheme ===
The SX150 came in Spring Grey or Apple Green and the final batch came in White Thorn and internal bodywork was sprayed New White. In foreign markets side panel colours came in Red and Blue. The SX200 only came in New White when it was first released and then White Thorn for the final batch, dampers were sprayed Fiat 690 Metallic Grey. In foreign markets side panel colours came in Red, Blue, Green, Gold, Purple and Black. Seats for the SX150 were black while the SX200 came with a red seat. in foreign markets such as the United Kingdom seats came in other colours like Green, Dark Blue and Light Blue.

== Serveta Jet 200 ==
Spanish Company Serveta gained the rights to produce a copy of the SX200 under license at their factory, with the first models being produced in 1966. These Spanish made Lambretta's were of high quality, specially designed for the local market and using a lot of locally sourced parts. Early Jet 200s were exact copies of the Italian made equivalent apart from Li styled horn casting and mudguard. The early models wore a 'Special X200' badge and SX200 panels. Later models had a 'Jet 200' badge under the 'Lambretta' badge on the leg shields and would later drop the disc brake, probably around the time Innocenti Lambretta folded as they were most likely factory supplied items. Later models moved the air filter into the toolbox with the door being louvred, they also featured stalk indicators, an ignition switch located behind the seat, warning lights on the speedometer and GP/DL styled stripes on the side panels. Production of Jet 200s stopped around 1984 with the Jet Series 80 200.

== Gallery ==
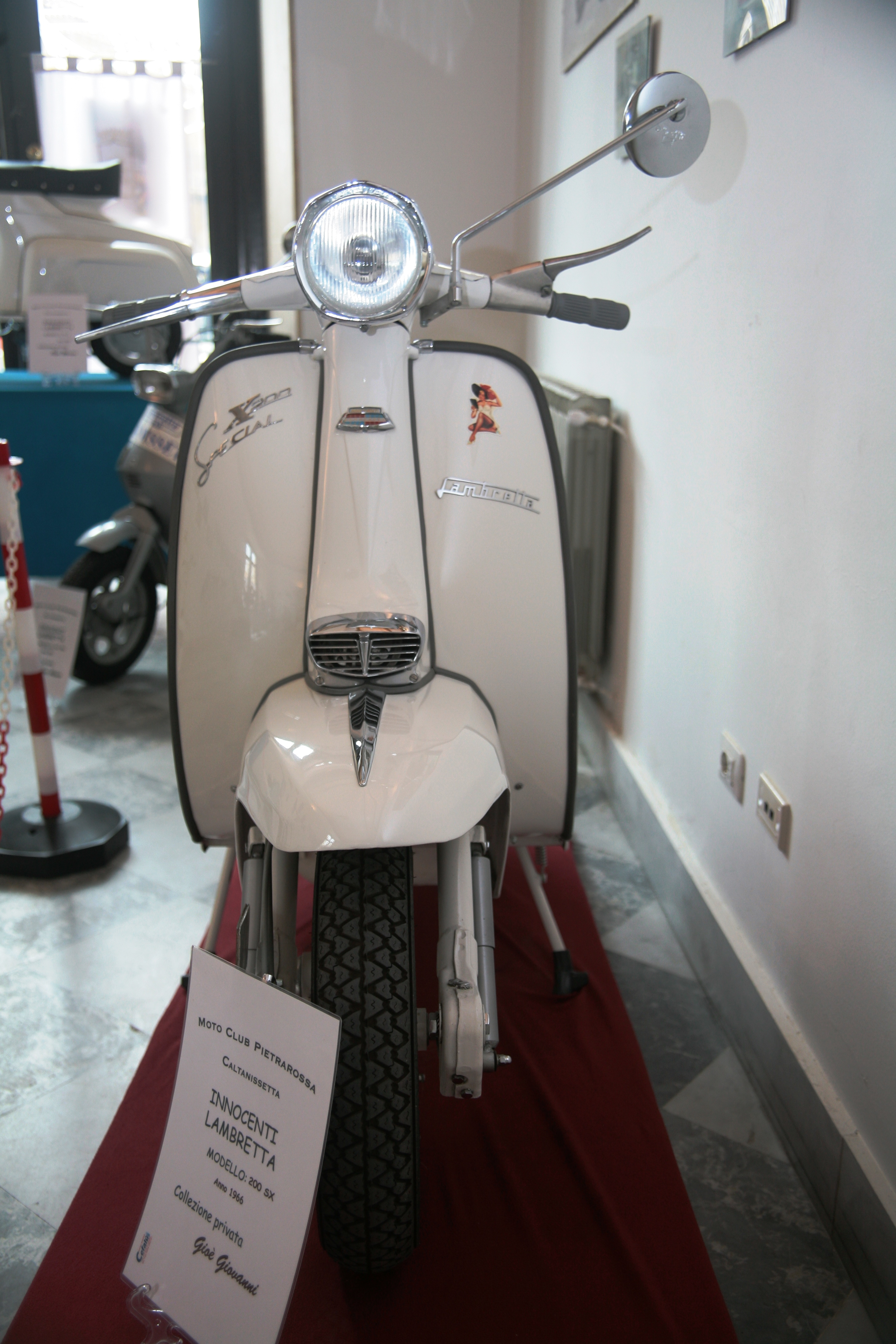
SX200 front end showing 'six penny' headset and square mudguard

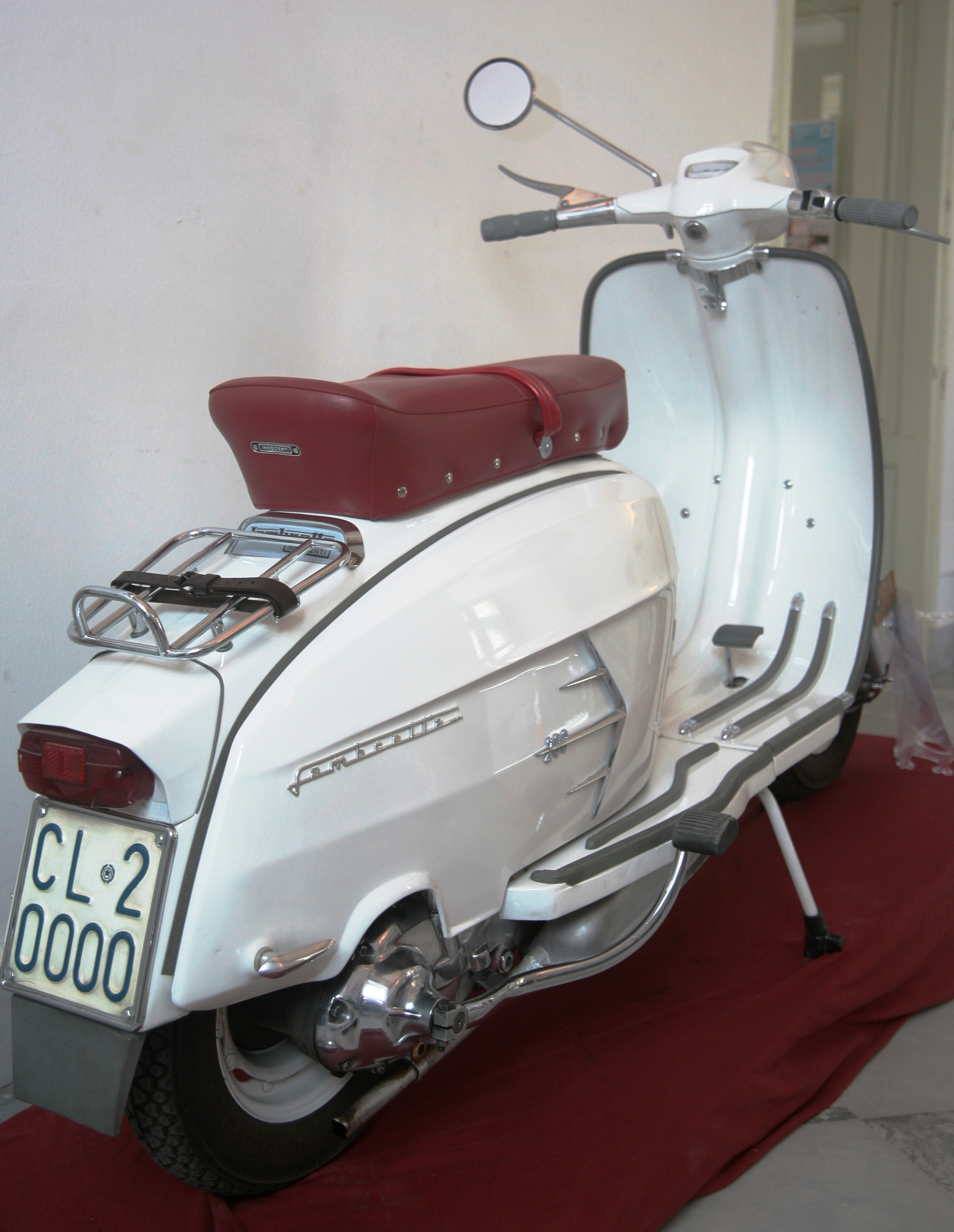
SX200 rear view

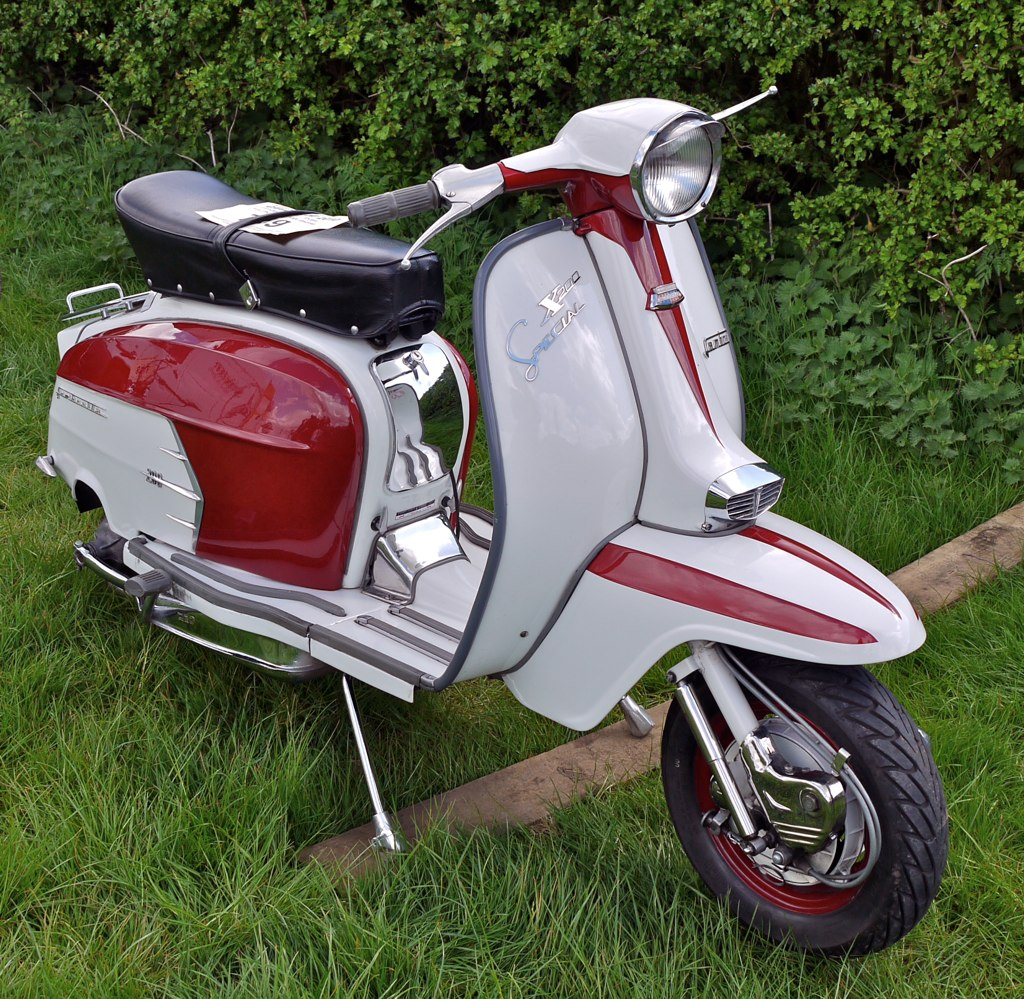
Custom SX200 with paint scheme similar that given to foreign market SX's with panels and horn casting 'V' painted

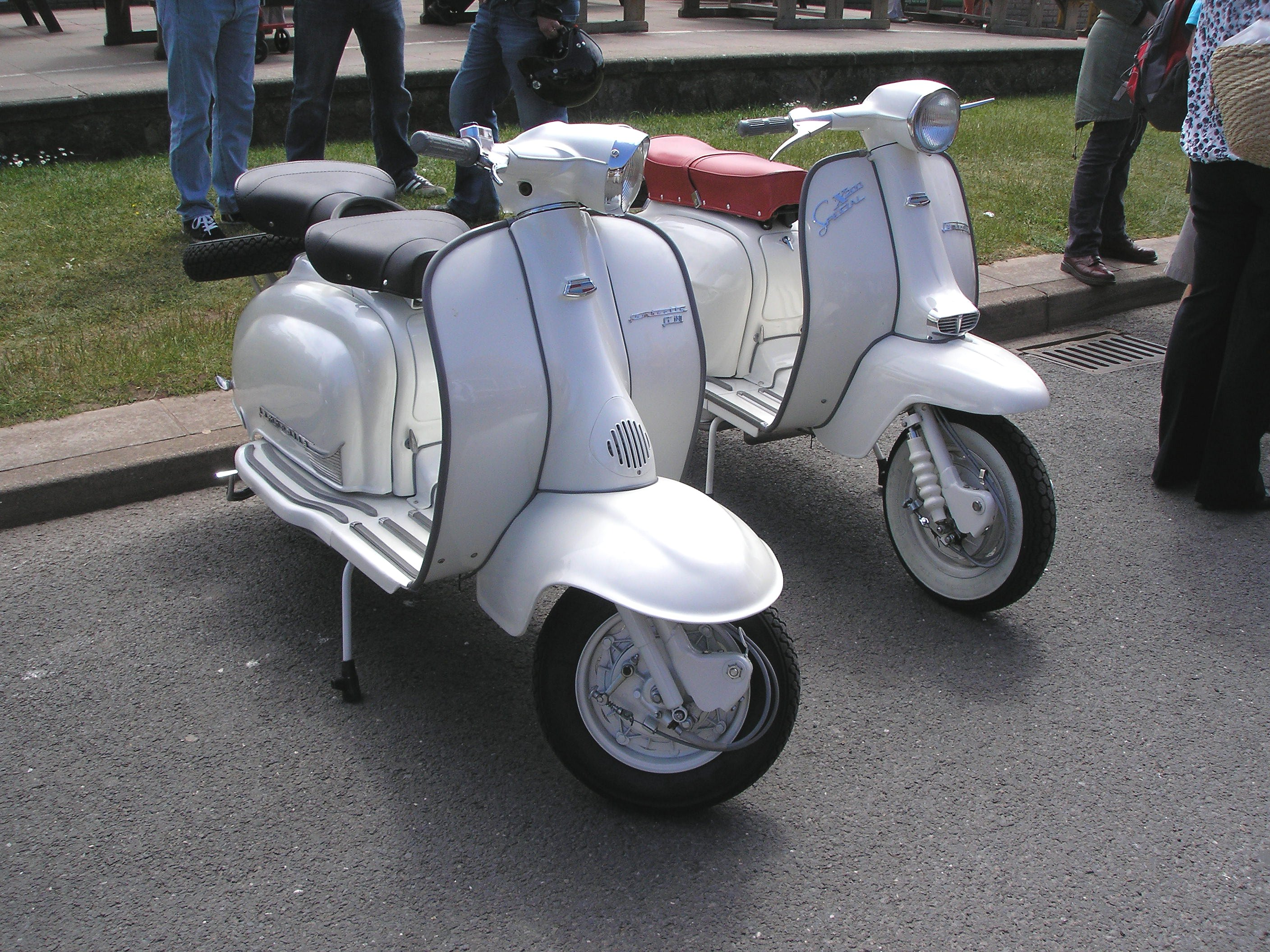
Series 2 Li150 (left) and SX200 (right)

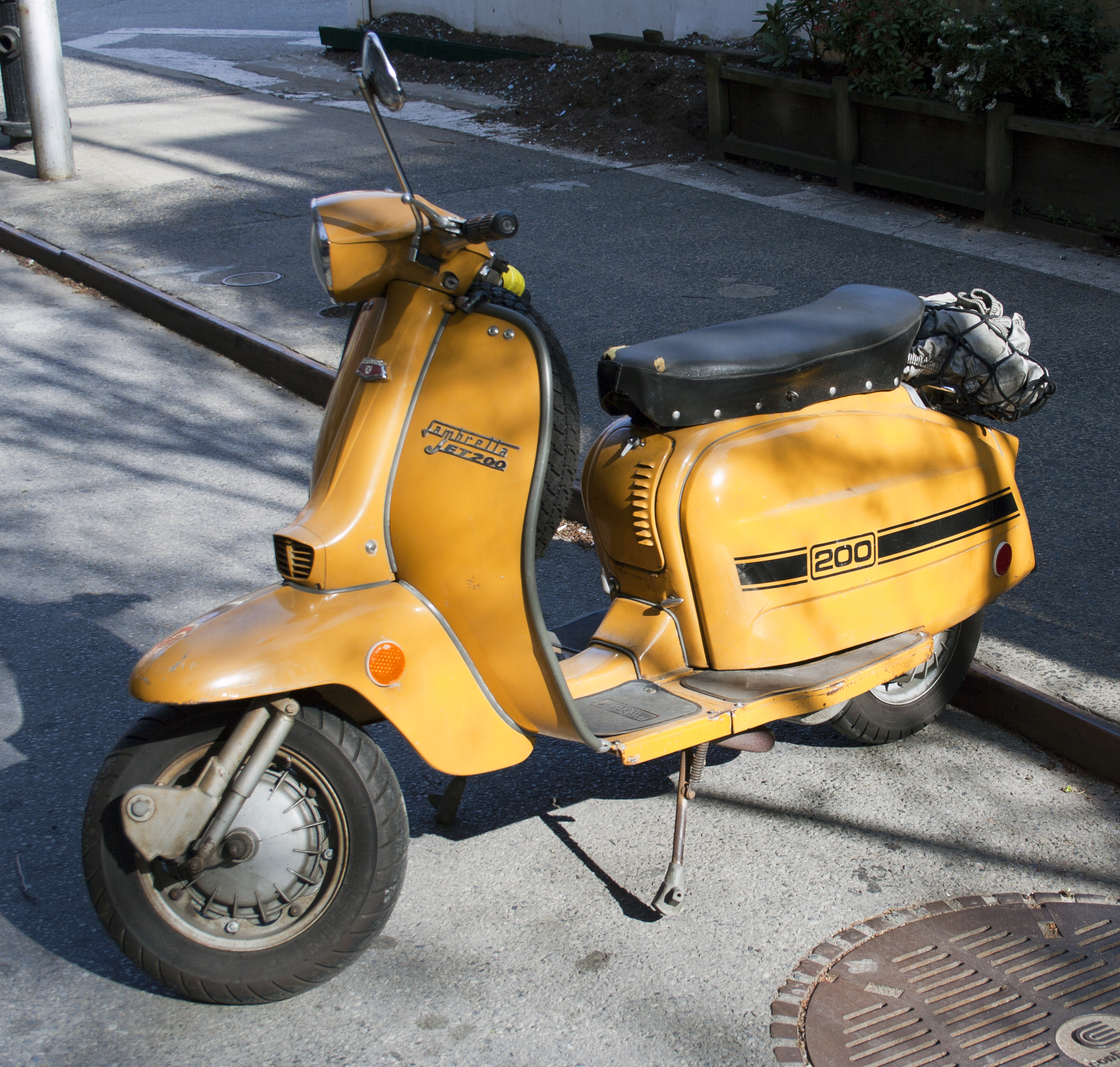
Serveta Jet 200 licensed copy of the SX200

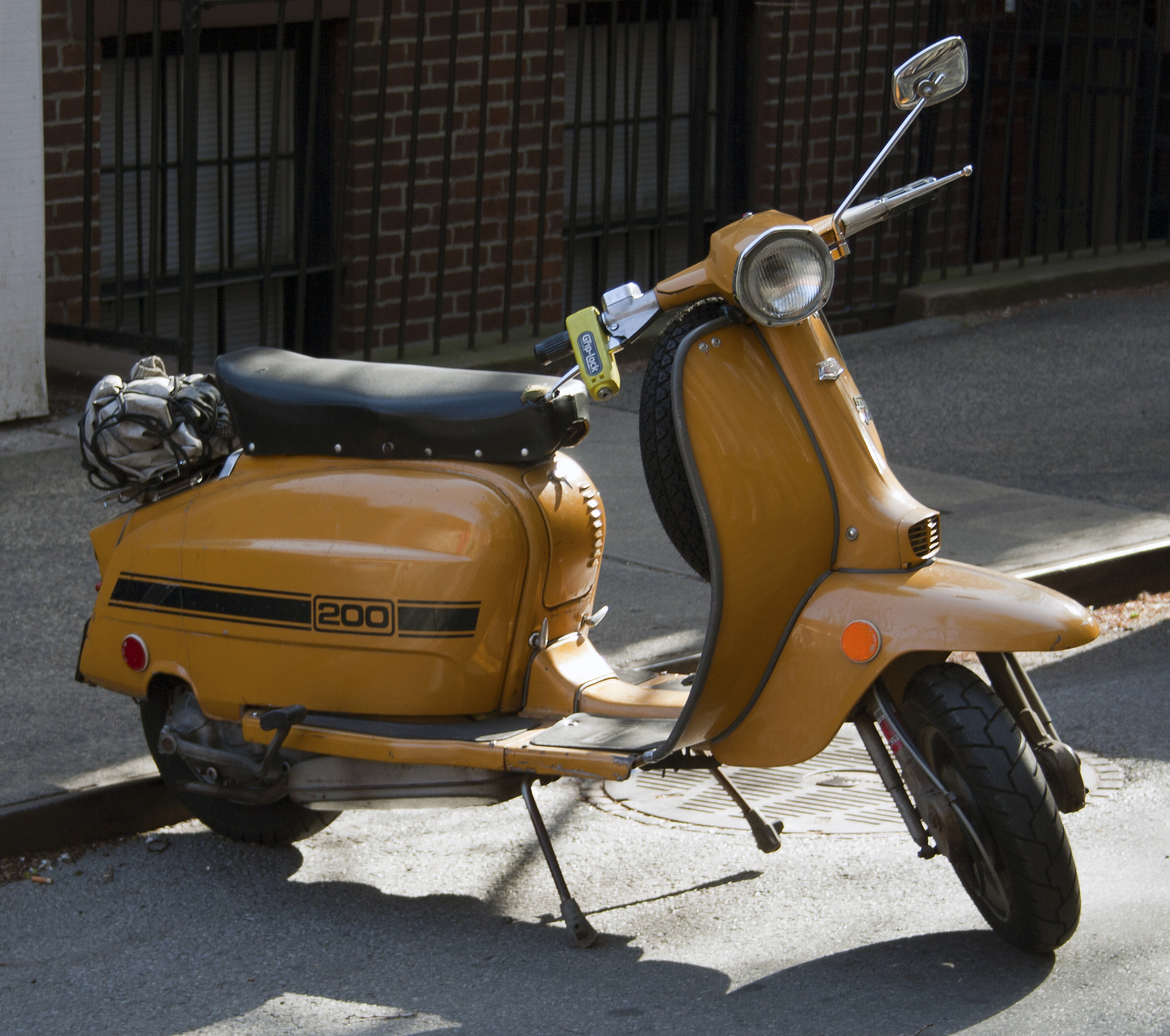
Serveta Jet 200
