= Lambretta V-Special =

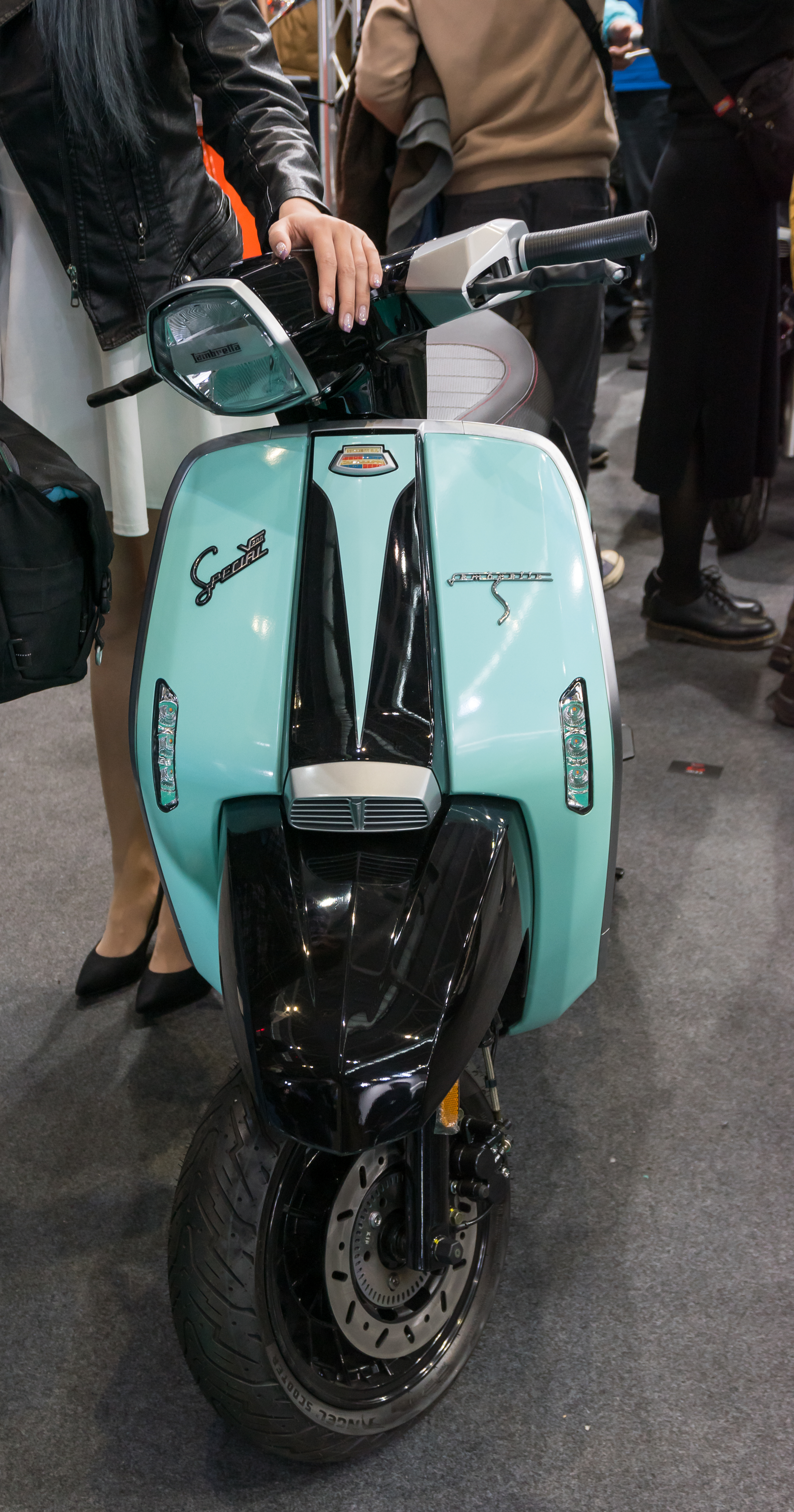
- V-Special 200 2011
- Manufacturer: Lambretta (Innocenti SA)
- Production: 2017–present
- Assembly: Gedersdorf Austria (KSR Group)
- Predecessor: Lambretta GP/DL
- Class: Scooter
- Engine: V50 - 49.5cc V125 - 124.7cc V200 - 168.9cc
- Compression ratio: V50 - 12.6:1 V125 - 10.7:1 V200 - 10.2:1
- Top speed: V50 - 27.9 mph (45 km/h) V125 - 59 mph (95 km/h) V200 - 62.1 mph (100 km/h)
- Power: V50 - 2.6 kW (3.5 hp; 3.5 PS) @ 7500 rpm V125 - 7.5 kW (10.1 hp; 10.2 PS) @8500 rpm V200 - 8.8 kW (11.8 hp; 12.0 PS) @8000 rpm
- Torque: V50 - 3.4 N⋅m (2.5 lbf⋅ft) @ 6500 rpm V125 - 9.2 N⋅m (6.8 lbf⋅ft) @ 7000 rpm V200 - 12.2 N⋅m (9.0 lbf⋅ft) @ 5500 rpm
- Ignition type: V50 - CDI V125/200 - ECU
- Transmission: CVT, belt final drive
- Frame type: Steel Tube
- Suspension: Front - Telescopic Fork Rear - Single Suspension
- Brakes: (V50) - Front-Hydraulic Disk Rear-Mechanical Drum (V125/200) Front-Hydraulic Disk Rear-Hydraulic Disk
- Tires: Front - 110/70-12 Rear - 120/70-12
- Wheelbase: 1340mm
- Dimensions: L: V50 - 1900mm V125/200 - 1890mm W: V50 - 690mm V125/200 - 695mm H: V50 - 1130mm V125/200 - 1115mm
- Seat height: V50 - 770mm V125/200 - 800mm
- Fuel capacity: V50 - 6.5 + 0.2 L (1.430 + 0.044 imp gal; 1.717 + 0.053 US gal) V125/200 - 6 + 0.2 L (1.320 + 0.044 imp gal; 1.585 + 0.053 US gal)
- Fuel consumption: V50 - 117.7 mpg_{‑imp} (2.40 L/100 km; 98.0 mpg_{‑US}) V125 - 100.9 mpg_{‑imp} (2.80 L/100 km; 84.0 mpg_{‑US}) V200 - 97.4 mpg_{‑imp} (2.90 L/100 km; 81.1 mpg_{‑US})

The Lambretta V-Special is a scooter produced Austrian KSR Group under the brand name Lambretta (own by Swiss Innocenti S.A.)

The scooter has been introduced in 3 models the V50 Special, V125 Special and the V200 Special. The V-Special began production in 2017 and is based on the SYM Fiddle.

== Design ==
The Lambretta V-Special was designed by KISKA (designers of KTM and Husqvarna Motorcycles) and the frame and engine are from an SYM Fiddle III. The engine displacements for the V50, V125 and V200 are 49.5cc, 124.7cc and 168.9cc respectively, and they are single cylinder 2-valve air-cooled four-strokes. The power is delivered through a continuously variable transmission (CVT) and uses a centrifugal clutch and is belt driven for the final drive. The body styling was an attempt to keep as much classic Lambretta looks in the bike as possible but some sacrifices had to be made due to the 'donor' bikes engine, chassis and suspension, such as the sloping foot boards and side panels and the height of the front mudguard. The front mudguard comes in two styles, 'Fixed' and 'Flex'. The side panels are double layered with a 1.2mm steel beam running to the sides which are the covered with side panels. It has Lambretta badges on the front light, rear and casing while the horn cover has an Innocenti badge.

=== Colours ===
The colour schemes available are Matt Grey or Orange for the V50 fixed Mudguard and Red, Blue, White and Black in flex mudguard. The V125 comes in Matt Grey or Orange in fixed mudguard and Red, Blue, White, Black and Brown in flex mudguard. The V200 with a fixed mudguard come in Orange and Silver Blue while with a flex mudguard it comes in Blue, White, Black and Brown. The seat colours depend on the colour chosen for the bike with Dunkelbraun coming with Matt Grey paint, Black coming with Orange, Red and Brown. The Dark brown seat comes with Silver Blue, Blue and Black paint jobs.

=== Pirelli Edition ===
The V125 Special Pirelli Edition is made in association with Pirelli the colour scheme is Matt Grey-Black lacquer finish with red Pirelli accents and is only available with 124.7cc engine displacement and a 'fixed fender' front mudguard. The Special collaboration edition is limited to 999 units worldwide.
