= Automobile Products of India =

Indian manufacturing company

Automobile Products of India (API)
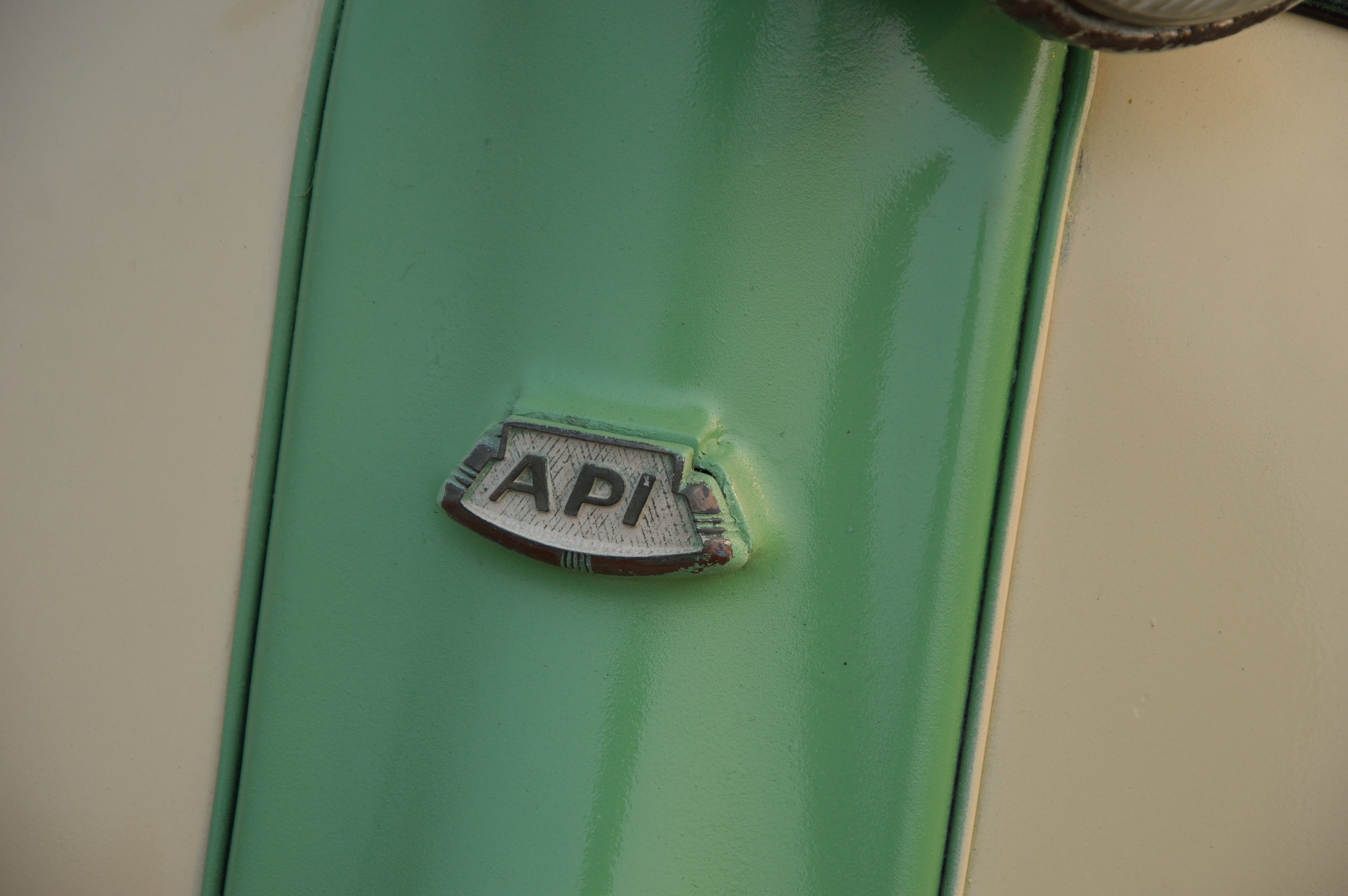
- Automobile Products of India Logo on Indian Lambretta
- Company type: Defunct
- Industry: Automotive
- Founded: 1949, Bombay
- Defunct: 2002
- Headquarters: Madras, now Chennai factory: Bombay, now Mumbai, Aurangabad
- Key people: Rootes Founders and M. A. Chidambaram
- Products: Lambretta, Lamby, API - Brakes and Clutches

Automobile Products of India (API) was founded in 1949 at Bombay (now Mumbai), by the British company Rootes Group, and later bought over by M. A. Chidambaram of the MAC Group from Madras (now Chennai). The company manufactured Lambretta scooters, API Three Wheelers under license from Innocenti of Italy and automotive ancillaries, notably clutch and braking systems. API's registered offices were earlier in Mumbai, later shifted to Chennai, in Tamil Nadu. The manufacturing facilities were located in Mumbai and Aurangabad in Maharashtra and in Ambattur, Chennai. The company has not been operational since 2002.

== History and operations ==
The main plant and old office for Scooters were located in Lal Bahadur Shastri Marg, Bhandup, Mumbai. Hind Auto Industries Ltd, manufacturing automobile Tie-Rod ends with German collaboration was amalgamated in 1968 and its products were included to API product portfolios. The Aurangabad unit was engaged in manufactured various Automobile components like Clutch and Braking systems for Maruti Udyog, Hindustan Motors, Bajaj Tempo, and Premier Automobiles Limited as original equipment.

In 1987 as part of expansion plan, the Chennai unit was started in Ambattur for production of Clutch and Braking systems.

== Scooters and three-wheelers ==
=== API Lambretta ===
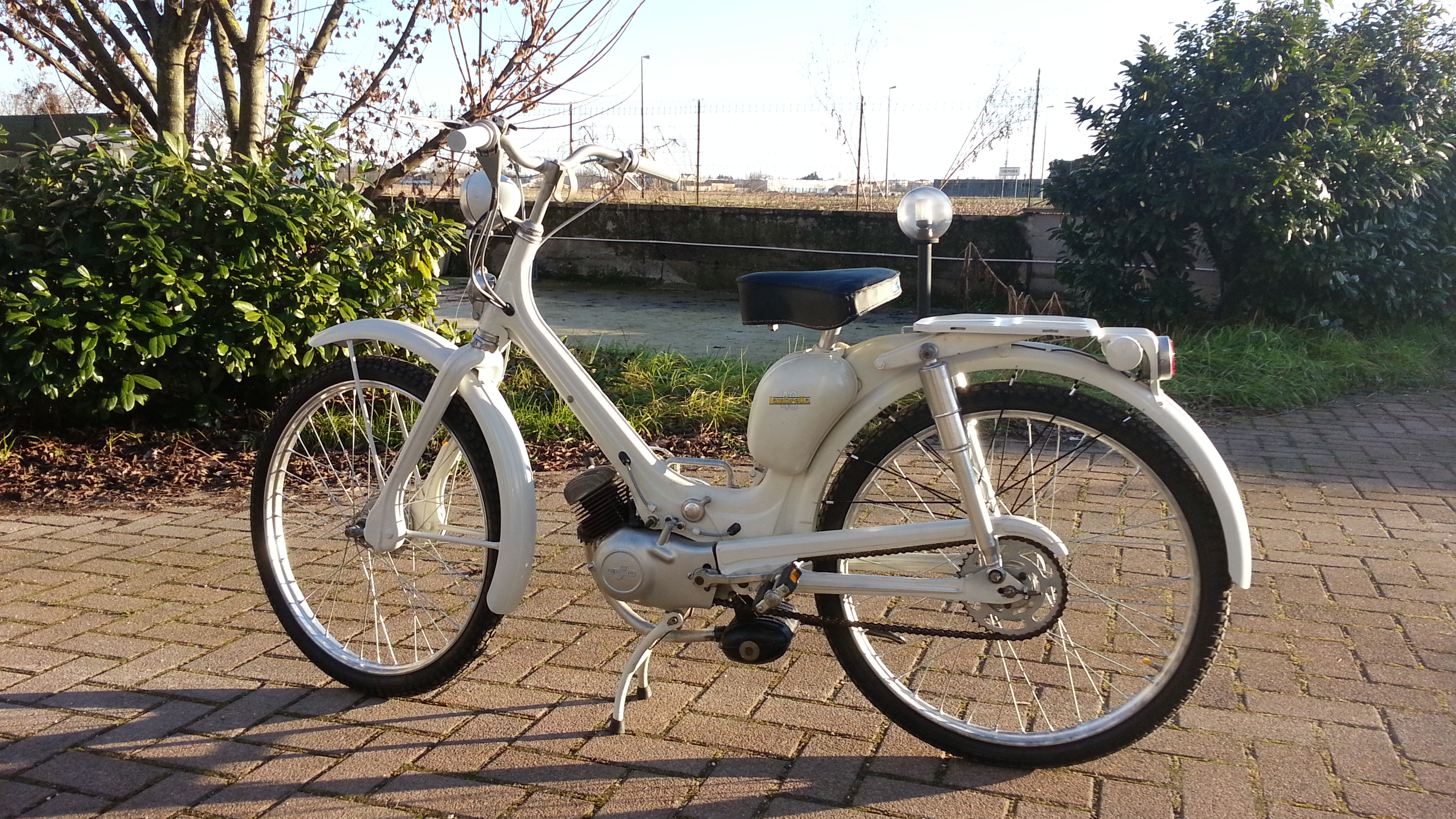
Lambretta 48 moped was sold by API, later was sold by under the brand name 'Laxmi' by Kirloskar-Ghatge Patil Motors

API was the first Indian scooter manufacturer. Scooters were initially assembled from Innocenti kits and sold under the Lambretta name. The early models were the Lambretta 48, a 48 cc moped and the D- and LD–series of scooters. In the early 1960s API acquired the rights to produce the Li-150 series 2 model. This was restyled with a smaller mudguard, smaller legshields, dual seats and press-on side panels.

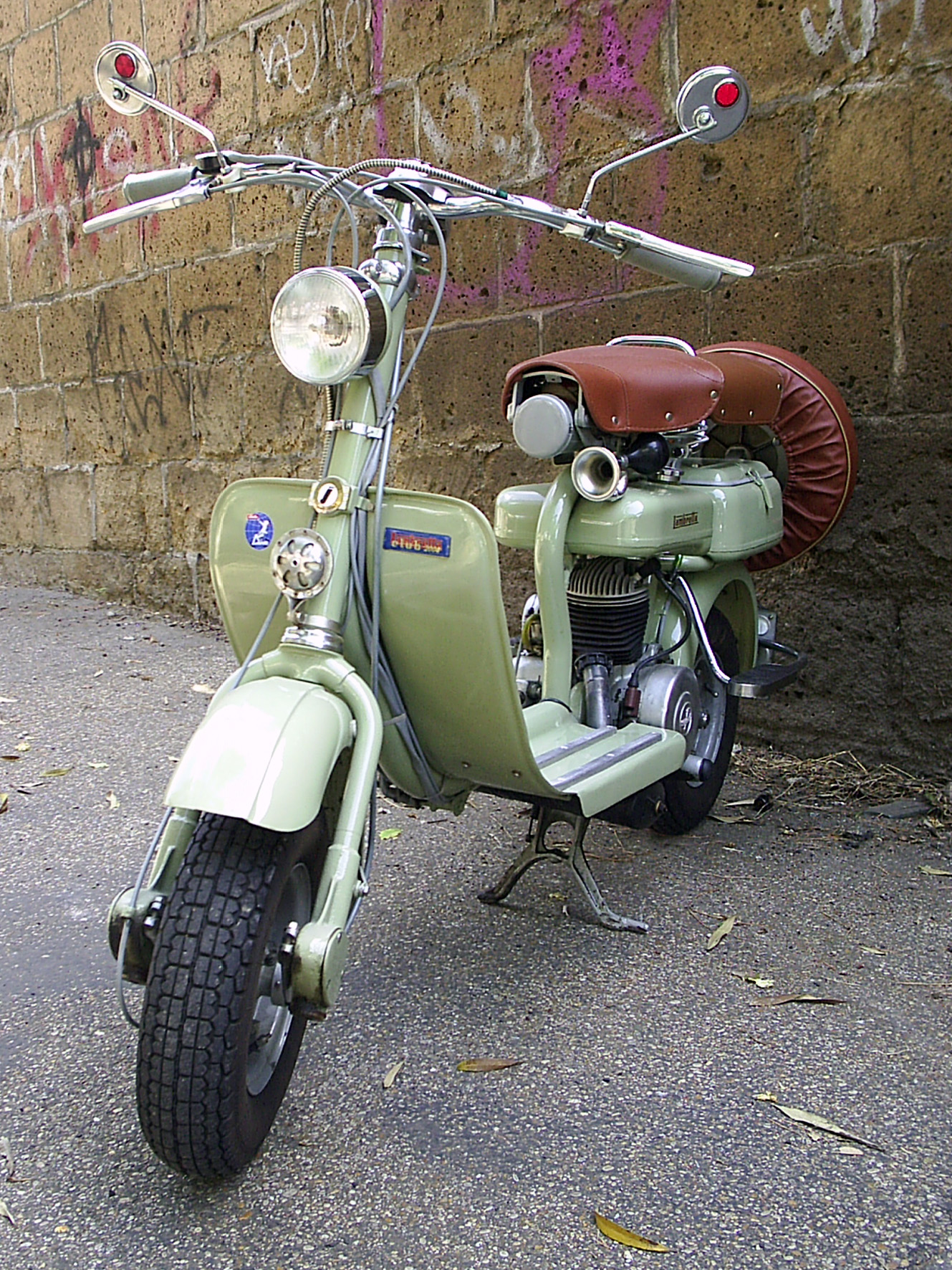
Lambretta D and LD series made by API

=== API Three-Wheeler ===
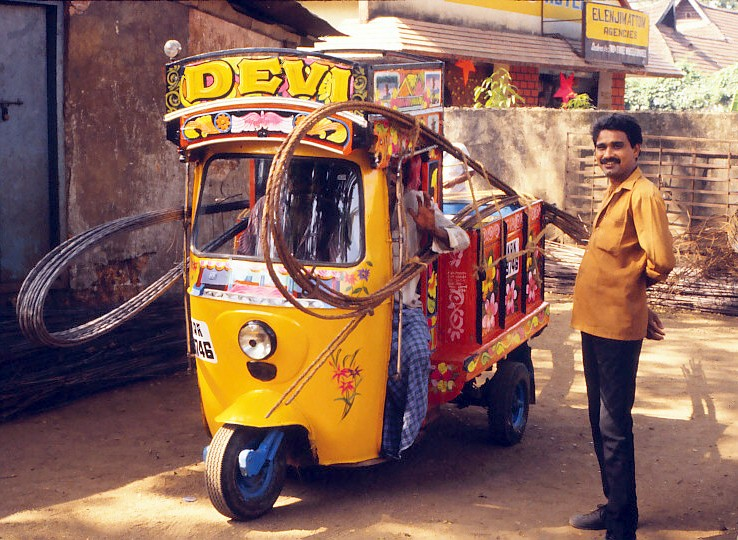
A decorated load carrier version API three wheeler with Lambretta 175 cc two-Stroke petrol engine

Also during this period API sold the API three wheeler Auto Rickshaw, in competition to the Bajaj three-wheeler. These auto rickshaws are still in operation in certain parts of the country, notably in some parts of Tamil Nadu, Karnataka and Kerala. In 1987, the Company entered into a technical collaboration with Yamaha Japan for technological upgradation of 3-wheeler engines. Also during 1991–92 . The company's R&D division developed a rear engine version of its Three-wheeler, a front diesel engine version for load carrier application, and a six-seater version of Three-wheeler for passengers application developed.

=== MAC Scooters ===
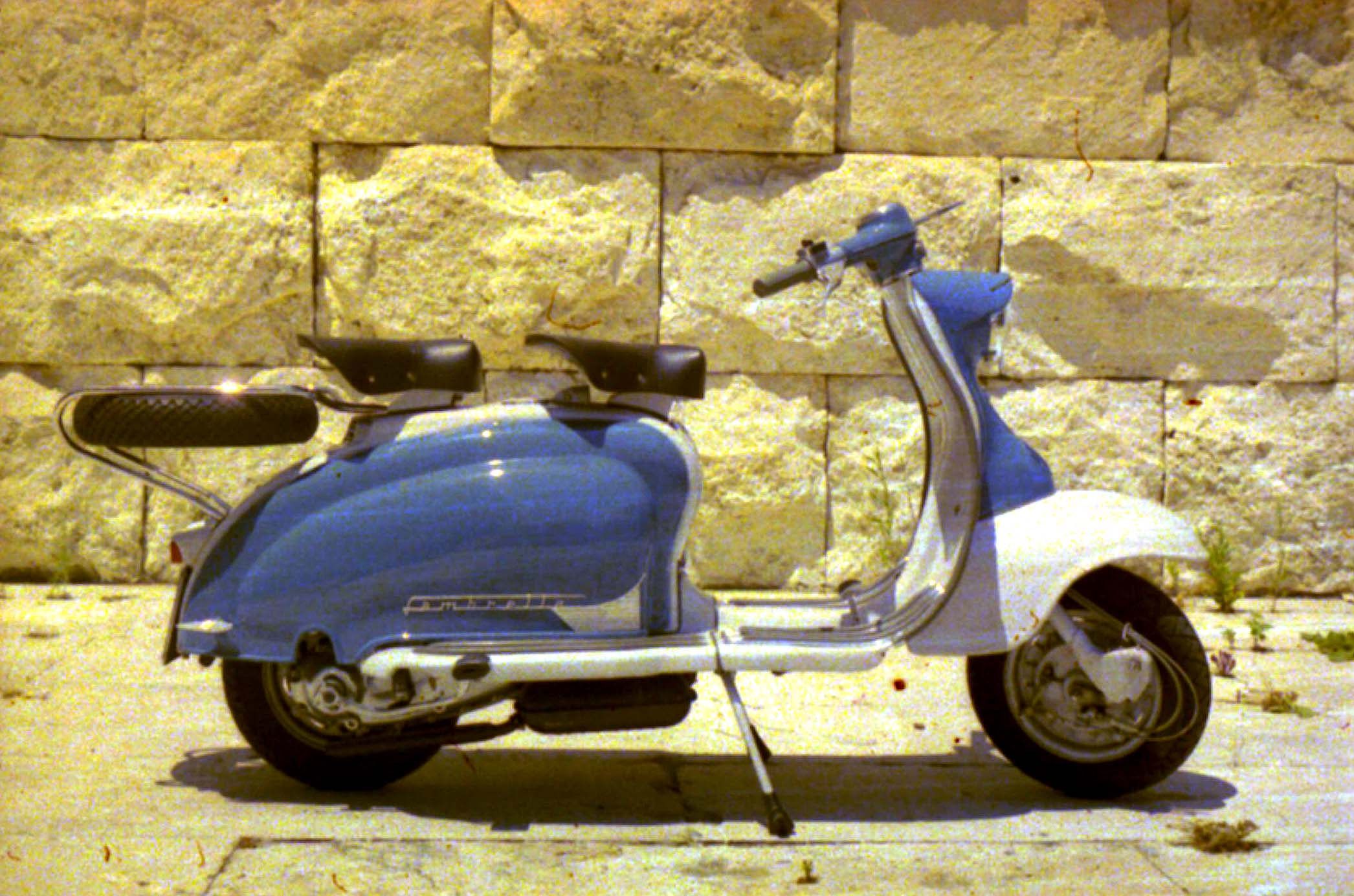
An early version of Lambretta 150 Li, sold during the 1950s

In 1972 Scooters India Ltd acquired exclusive rights to the Lambretta name. API then sold its scooters under the MAC brand, M.A.C being the initials of its founder (Dr. Muthiah Annamalai Chidambaram). The MAC 175 came on to the market in the same year.

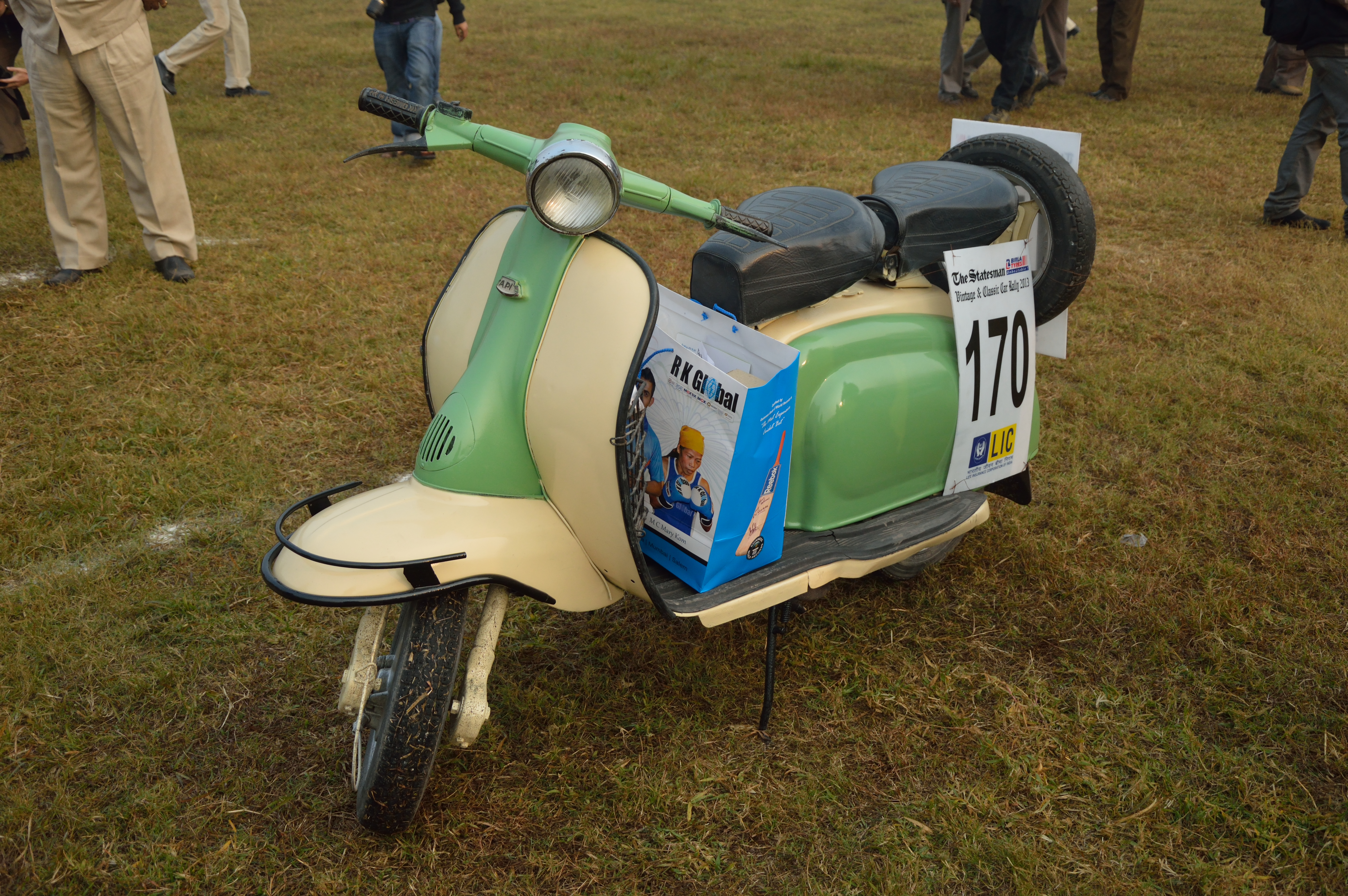
A fully restored 1971 API Lambretta, 150cc model at a Kolkata bike and scooter show

=== API Lamby ===
In 1977, API started selling scooters under the "Lamby" name. The Lamby scooter was remodeled several times, the last of these being the Lamby Polo in 1986. The Polo model had sharp corners and edges, and the styling looked sleeker than earlier models. Unfortunately it failed to sell and production ceased.

The Lamby and MAC brands are virtually unknown outside India as API's licence prohibited them from selling Lambretta-derived scooters elsewhere.

=== Model specifications ===
	125 D	125 LD	150 Li	MAC 175	Lamby 150	Lamby Polo 125	Lamby Polo 150
Produced	1955–1957	1955–1957	1962–1977	1972–1977	1977–1986	1986–1990	1986–1990
Bore	52 mm	52 mm	57 mm	62 mm	57 mm	52 mm	57 mm
Stroke	58 mm						
CC	123 cc	123 cc	148 cc	173 cc	148 cc	123 cc	148 cc
Gears	3	4					
Top speed	44 mph	44 mph	50 mph	56 mph	50 mph	47 mph	53 mph
Drive	Shaft		Chain				

Model specification source:

== Auto ancillaries ==
The auto-ancillary business consisted mainly of clutch and braking systems, apart from tie-rod units and was a principle original equipment supplier for almost all major automotive companies in India. In addition to some of "API" marked components were used by Lambretta scooters themselves.

=== Brakes and clutches ===
The ancillary business consisted of manufacturing clutch assemblies in association with Borg & Beck Company (now BorgWarner) of Michigan USA and Lockheed, Fiat and ATE Brakes for hydraulic brakes and API brake linings. The company, since the 1960s, manufactured brake linings under a licence from Firestone Tire and Rubber Company of Akron, United States. A similar agreement was executed with Fichtel & Sachs A.G. (now ZF Sachs), of West Germany in November 1972 for the manufacture of F & S clutches from 1972 for a period of 5 years.

The Aurangabad unit manufactured in collaboration with Automotive Products (AP) of Lemington Spa, England, clutches and brakes until 1970. Later the Company entered into a fresh collaboration agreement for 5 years with them for the manufacture of Borg & Beck clutches and Lockheed hydraulic brakes on revised terms and conditions.

API also indigenously developed Brake linings and Brake fluids for various other Indian Automobiles including Maruti Udyog.

== Decline and closure ==
In 1984, the company saw increase in sales, but the operations resulted in losses due to a "go-slow" strike by workers in Mumbai and Aurangabad units coupled with substantial rise in input and transportation costs. The Company changed the product-mix at Bhandup, by increasing the production of 3 wheelers. In 1985, the working improved and sales increased by 20% and a new model scooter 'Lamby Polo 150' was launched in the latter half of the year, with styling contracted to a Japanese Design firm, but failed to make any impact with the onslaught of Japanese rivals who entered the Indian market with other associations.

In 1986, sales declined due to competition and recession in the automobile industry. Further, suspension of work in the Aurangabad factory followed by a lock-out from November, 1986, intensified the situation. To sustain the growth in the 3-wheeler market, the company made all efforts to improve and increases its exports of three-wheelers, particularly of load carriers. Also an additional unit in Tamil Nadu was planned and went commenced operations in 1987.

With the erosion of net worth by 1987, the company was placed under Board for Industrial and Financial Reconstruction (BIFR) as per Sick Industrial Companies Act, 1985 for a period of 1988–89 (15 months). Further efforts to improve three-wheeler sales and a license to manufacture mopeds in Tamil Nadu never materialized. Later the company ceased operations for the three-wheeler and scooter lines and continued with the ancillary units.

The company finally ceased production in 2002. Automobile Products of India Limited currently operates as a subsidiary of Kiyana Real Estate Private Limited.

== See also ==
- Innocenti
- Lambretta
