= Ace of Herts =

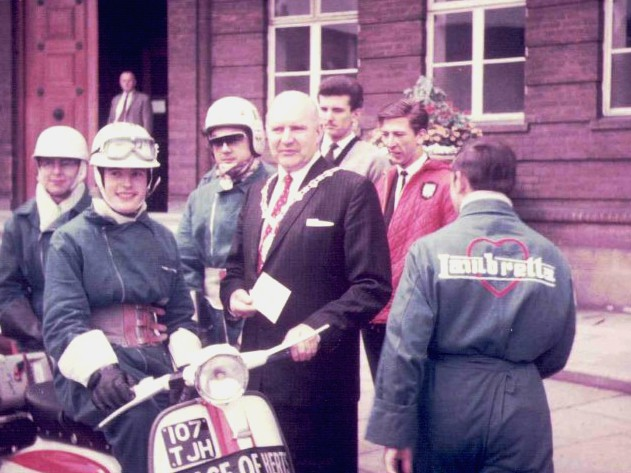
Ace of Herts club members with the mayor of Watford in 1963

The Ace of Herts was one of the first dedicated Lambretta scooter clubs in greater London, running from 1958 to 1971. Based in Watford, Hertfordshire, it was formed by Arthur Francis, a scooter dealer. The club subsequently became the Watford Lambretta Club. This built upon the strength of Lambretta clubs elsewhere in the country, following on from the formation of the Lambretta Club of Great Britain in 1953, driven also by the emerging mod culture.

Achievements of club members include:

- M. Evans: first testing of the Li 150 model (Li Series 2) during a 24-hour county challenge in 1960.
- Hazel Holland (club secretary) on a solo 24 hour charity run.
- Arthur Francis: British lambretta Rally Champion in 1964.
- Roy Wilson winning the Southend International Scooter Rally Finals (out of 3000 riders).
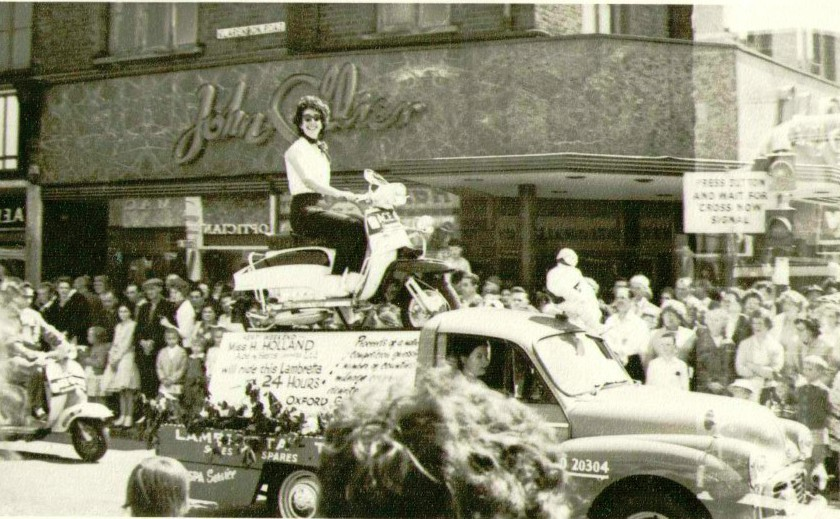
Parade before a charity Lambretta scooter endurance event, 1963

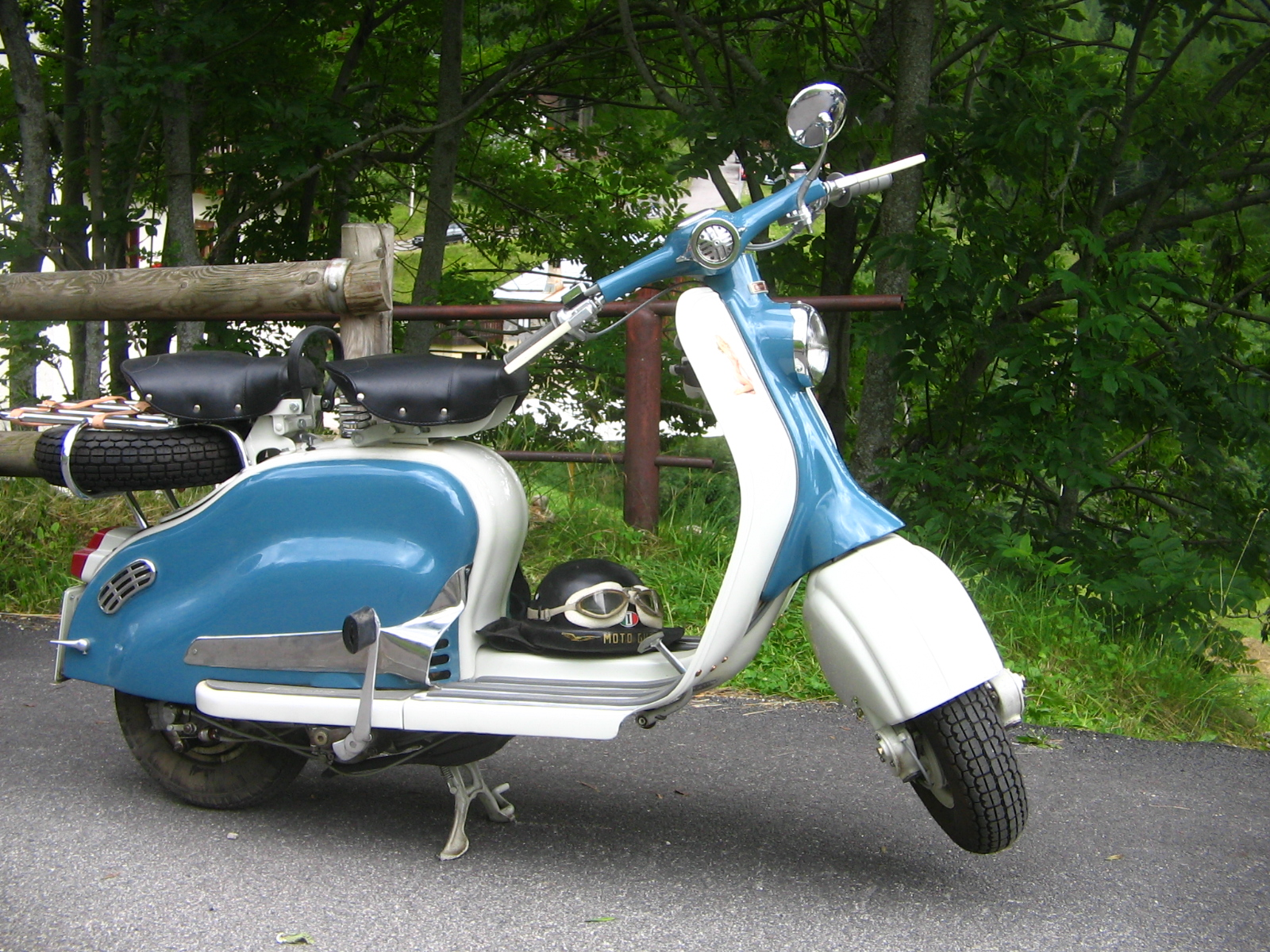
Lambretta 150 LD
