= Lambretta Scooter Museum =

- Location within Somerset and the United Kingdom
- Location: Weston-super-Mare, Somerset
- Coordinates: 51.3485°N 2.9700°W

The Lambretta Scooter Museum is in Weston-super-Mare, Somerset, England. It houses a total of 61 Lambretta models – at least one from each year between October 1947 through to May 1971.

The private collection goes from three model 'A's first produced in 1947, to Lambro three-wheelers, Lambretta mopeds, and associated automobilia.

In 2006, the shop and museum were sold to Stuart Lanning. After a long period of closure, the museum and its exhibits were refurbished and re-opened on 9 August 2008. The museum was offered for sale again in 2013.
