= Lambretta =

Brand name of Italian (mainly) motor scooters

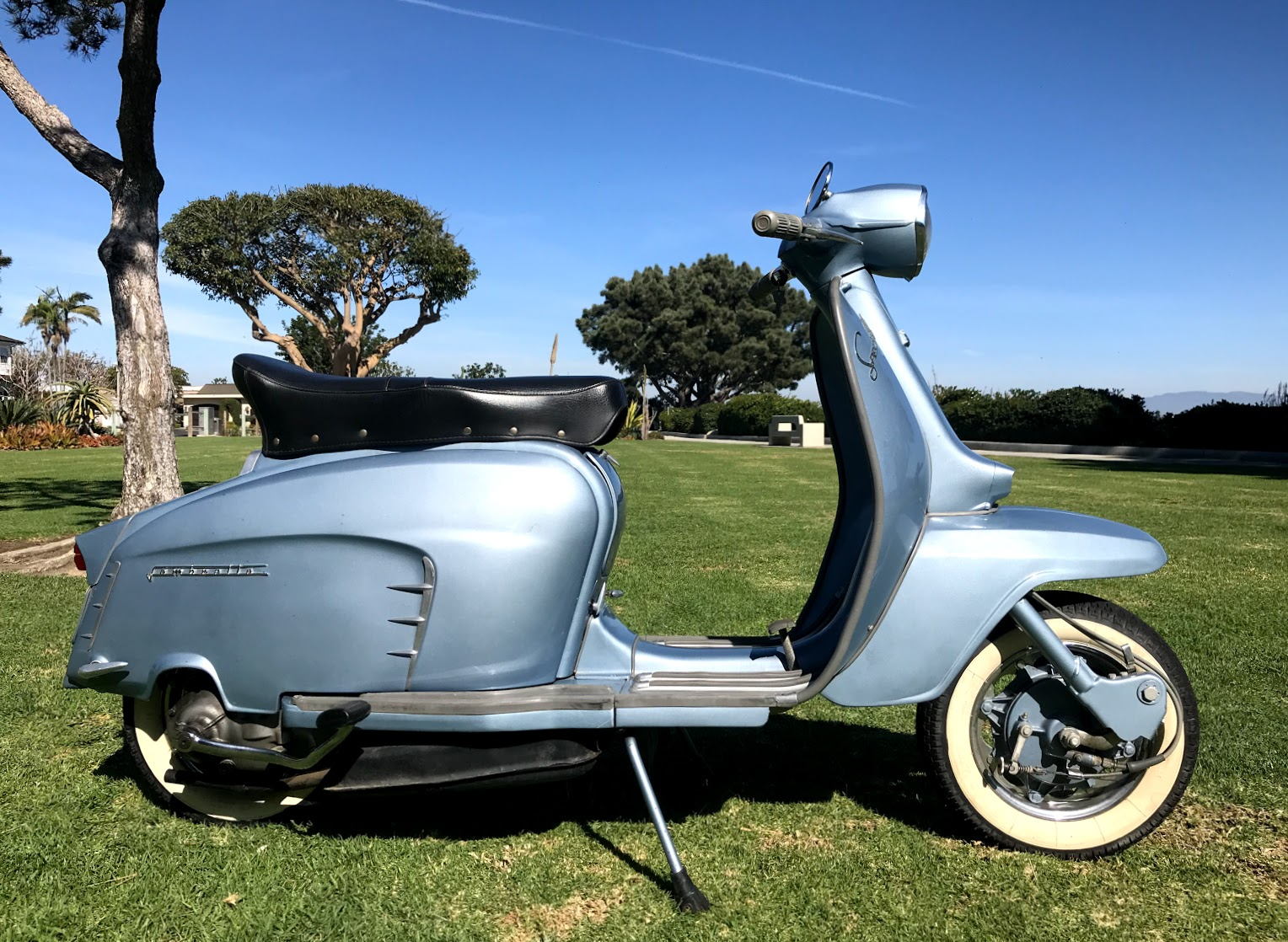
- 1966 Lambretta Li 125 Special
- Industry: Scooter
- Founded: 1947; 79 years ago
- Fate: Restructured & restricted become to Limited Industry.
- Headquarters: Milan, Italy
- Key people: Ferdinando Innocenti
- Products: Lambretta, Lambro, Serveta and Siambretta
- Parent: Innocenti
- Subsidiaries: Lambretta Licensing Ltd. and Lambretta GmbH
- Website: lambretta.com lambro.com

Lambretta (Italian pronunciation: [lamˈbretta]) was a brand of motor scooters, manufactured in Milan, Italy, by Innocenti.

The name is derived from the word Lambrate, the suburb of Milan named after the river Lambro which flows through the area, and where the factory was located. Lambretta was the name of a mythical water-sprite associated with the river which runs adjacent to the former production site.

In 1972, the Indian government bought the machinery of the Milanese factory, creating Scooters India Limited (SIL) in order to produce Lambretta scooters and also Lambro three-wheelers, the latter under the name Vikram for the domestic market. Lambretta scooters were also manufactured under licence by Fenwick in France, NSU in Germany, Serveta in Spain, API in India, Yulon in Taiwan, Pasco in Brazil, Auteco in Colombia and Siambretta in Argentina.

Innocenti S.A. (also known as Lambretta Consortium) based in Lugano, Switzerland is the owner of the international trademark Lambretta and has licensed the brand throughout the world. There is however no direct connection to the original Innocenti manufacturing company nor the original Lambretta scooters, other than use of the brand names.

== History ==
In 1922, Ferdinando Innocenti of Pescia built a steel-tubing factory in Rome. In 1931, he took the business to Milan where he built a larger factory producing seamless steel tubing and employing about 6,000. The factory was heavily bombed and destroyed during World War II.

=== Concept ===
The main stimulus for the design style of the Lambretta and Vespa dates back to pre-World War II Cushman scooters made in Nebraska, United States. These olive green scooters were in Italy in large numbers, ordered originally by the United States military as field transport for the paratroops and marines. The United States military had used them to get around German defence tactics of destroying roads and bridges in the Dolomites (a section of the Alps) and the Austrian border areas.

Aeronautical engineer General Corradino D'Ascanio, responsible for the design and construction of the first modern helicopter by Agusta, was given the job by Ferdinando Innocenti of designing a simple, robust and affordable vehicle. It had to be easy to drive for both men and women, be able to carry a passenger and not get its driver's clothes soiled.

=== Design ===
D'Ascanio, who hated motorbikes, introduced many changes to his vehicle. It was built on a spar frame with a handlebar gear change and the engine mounted directly onto the rear wheel. The front protection "shield" kept the rider dry and clean in comparison to the open front end on motorcycles. The pass-through leg area design was geared towards women, as wearing dresses or skirts made riding conventional motorcycles a challenge. The front fork, like an aircraft's landing gear, allowed for easy wheel changing. The internal mesh transmission eliminated the standard motorcycle chain, a source of oil and dirt. This basic design allowed a series of features to be deployed on the frame which would later allow quick development of new models.

However, D'Ascanio fell out with Innocenti, who rather than a stamped spar frame wanted to produce his frame from rolled tubing, allowing him to revive both parts of his pre-war company. D'Ascanio disassociated himself from Innocenti and took his design to Enrico Piaggio who produced the spar-framed Vespa from 1946 on. The final design of the Lambretta was done by aeronautical engineers Cesare Pallavicino and Pier Luigi Torre. Pallavicino had been Technical Director at the Caproni airplane factory during World War II before working on the Lambretta design. Torre was an engine designer at Italo Balbo's Idros; he designed the engine and organized Innocenti's factory for mass production.

=== Production ===
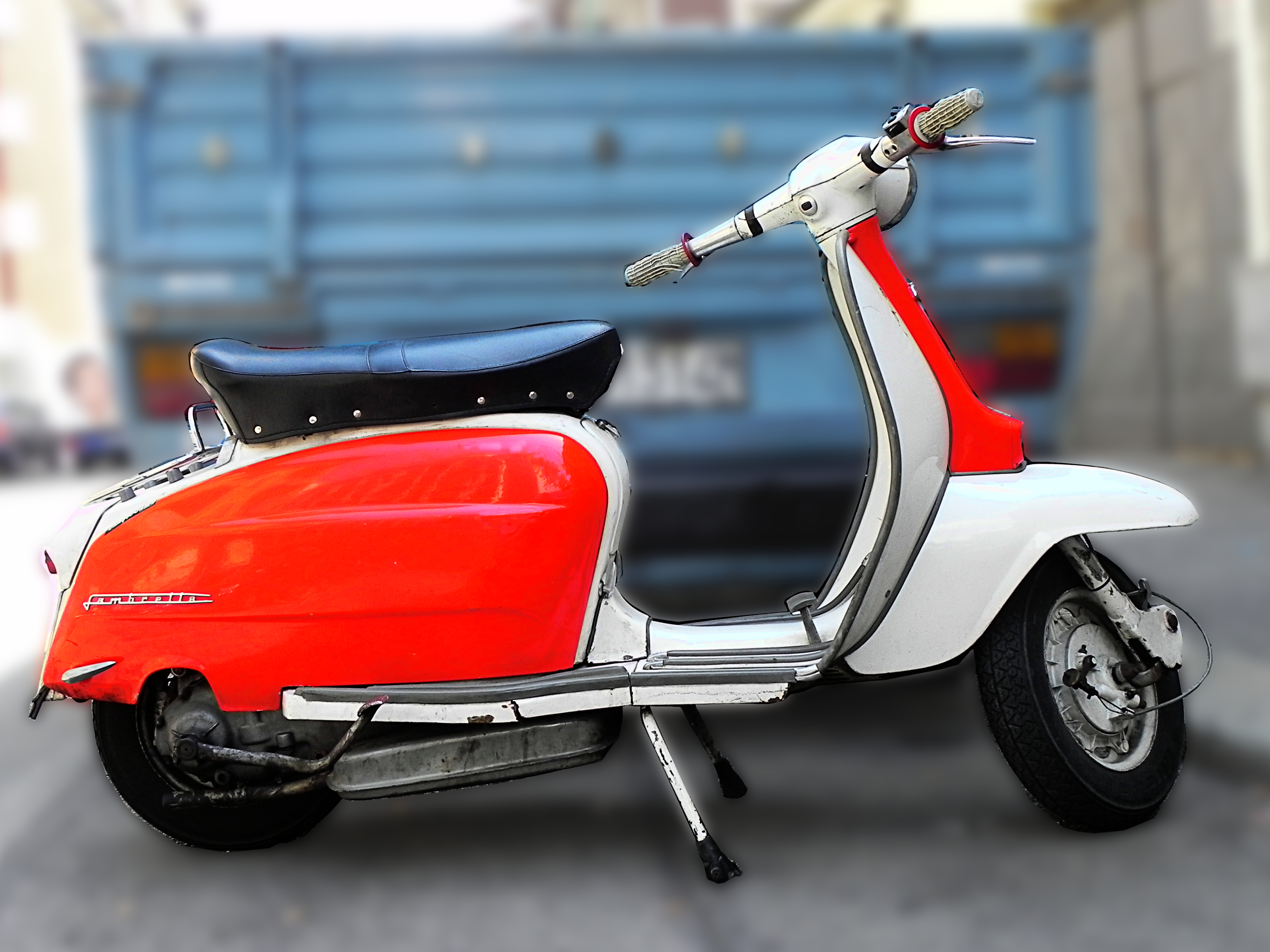
Innocenti Lambretta 150

Arriving on the market the following year, the 1947 Lambretta featured a rear pillion seat for a passenger or optionally a storage compartment. The original front protection "shield" was a flat piece of aero metal; later this developed into a twin skin to allow additional storage behind the front shield, similar to the glove compartment in a car. The fuel cap was underneath the hinged seat, which saved the cost of an additional lock on the fuel cap or need for additional metal work on the smooth skin.

Innocenti started production of Lambretta scooters in 1947, the year after Piaggio started production of its Vespa models. Lambrettas were manufactured under licence in Argentina, Brazil, Chile, Colombia, India and Spain, sometimes under other names, but always to a recognizable design, e.g. Siambretta in South America and Serveta in Spain. American retailer Montgomery Ward imported the Lambretta Li125 and sold it via their catalog under the Riverside captive import brand.

=== Lambretta France ===
The French importer of Lambretta, one Henri Willame, also started a company selling imported microcars under the catch-all "Willam" label. Many of these creations received Lambretta engines, and were sold through the French Lambretta network. Certain minicars, such as the 123 cc "Lambretta Lisa" (built by DECSA in San Marino) were sold primarily with "Lambretta" badging. The four-wheeled version of the Casalini Sulky was sold as the Willam Bretta in France, beginning in 1980.

=== BLMC closure of Innocenti ===
As wealth increased in western Europe in the late 1960s, the demand for motor scooters fell as the small car became affordable to more people and Lambretta sales started to decline, as did the financial status of parent company Innocenti. The British Leyland Motor Corporation took advantage of Innocenti's production and engineering expertise and in 1961 had contracted Innocenti to produce cars such as the Innocenti Mini under licence from BLMC.

Innocenti was eventually sold to BLMC. Unfortunately, lack of foresight had caused BLMC to join a fashion trend that was ending rapidly. Long industrial strikes in BLMC ensued; motor-scooter sales declined sharply, and Innocenti finally closed shop in 1972. Scooter sales in many of Lambretta's export markets, such as India and Indonesia dropped precipitously as light Japanese motorcycles replaced scooters.

In the early 2000s a number of modern plastic scooters originating in China and Taiwan started appearing on western markets with 'Lambretta' branding on them. These were nothing to do with Scooters India Ltd nor the original Lambretta scooters.

As of 2017, The Lambretta Consortium has launched the "Lambretta V-Special" model.

=== India ===
Automobile Products of India / Scooters India Ltd
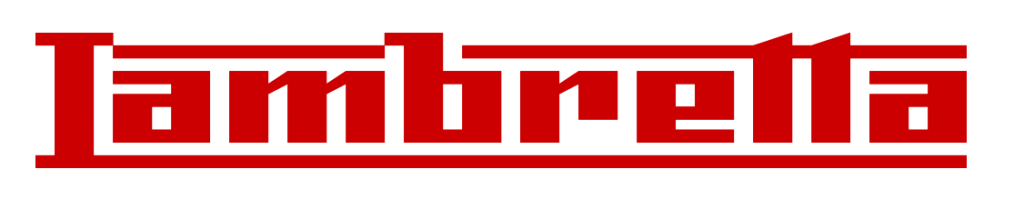
- Industry: Scooter
- Founded: 1972
- Headquarters: Bombay / Lucknow, India
- Products: Lambretta, Lamby, Vijay, Vikram, Lambro

The Indian government bought the factory for essentially the same reasons that Ferdinando Innocenti had built it after the war. India was a country with poor infrastructure, economically not ready for small private cars yet with a demand for private transport.

Automobile Products of India (API) began assembling Innocenti-built Lambretta scooters in India after independence in the 1950s beginning with 48 cc, Ld model, Li 1st series. They eventually acquired a licence to build the Li150 Series 2 model, which was sold under the Lambretta name until about 1976 and later on changed the name to Lamby for legal reasons. They also for sometime made and sold Lambretta TV 175 series under the name of Mac 175. Scooter India Ltd acquired the entire Innocenti Unit in 1972. API also built the trademark model [API-175] three-wheeler which was based on Innocenti's Lambro. API continued to build Lambretta-derived models until the 1990s but have been non-operational since 1993.

In 1972, Scooters India Ltd. (SIL) a state-run enterprise based in Lucknow, Uttar Pradesh, bought the entire Lambretta manufacturing and trademark rights. Former Innocenti employees were used to set up an Indian factory as all the manuals and machinery instructions were in Italian. The first scooter built was the Lambretta 150dl. This was later rebadged as the Vijay Delux/DL for the homemarket, but remained badged the Lambretta150dl or the Lambretta GP150 in export markets. The homemarket model was later enhanced to become the Vijay Super. Further improvements were made in the final years of production by incorporating a 12v electronic ignition with contemporary Japanese style CDI unit and an advanced front suspension. SIL also distributed complete knock downs that were assembled in different parts of India and sold as the Allwyn Pusphak, Falcon, and Kesari. These were of a lower quality than the SIL-produced models and sometimes incorporated significant styling changes.

SIL production seems to have peaked during the financial year 1980–81, with around 35,000 scooters being built. However, by 1987 this had dropped to around 4,500 units with production finally ceasing in 1997. After that SIL's production centred on the Lambro/ Vikram three-wheeler, powered by the Lambretta 2-stroke engine but also versions with diesel and electric power. SIL still produced limited spares for the GP/DL range of scooters, albeit sporadically.

The SIL factory finally closed in 2022.

As of 2010, The Lambretta Consortium has filed a suite against SIL (Scooters India Limited) for nonusage of the Lambretta Brand, seeking to claim the Lambretta brand name.

=== Legacy ===
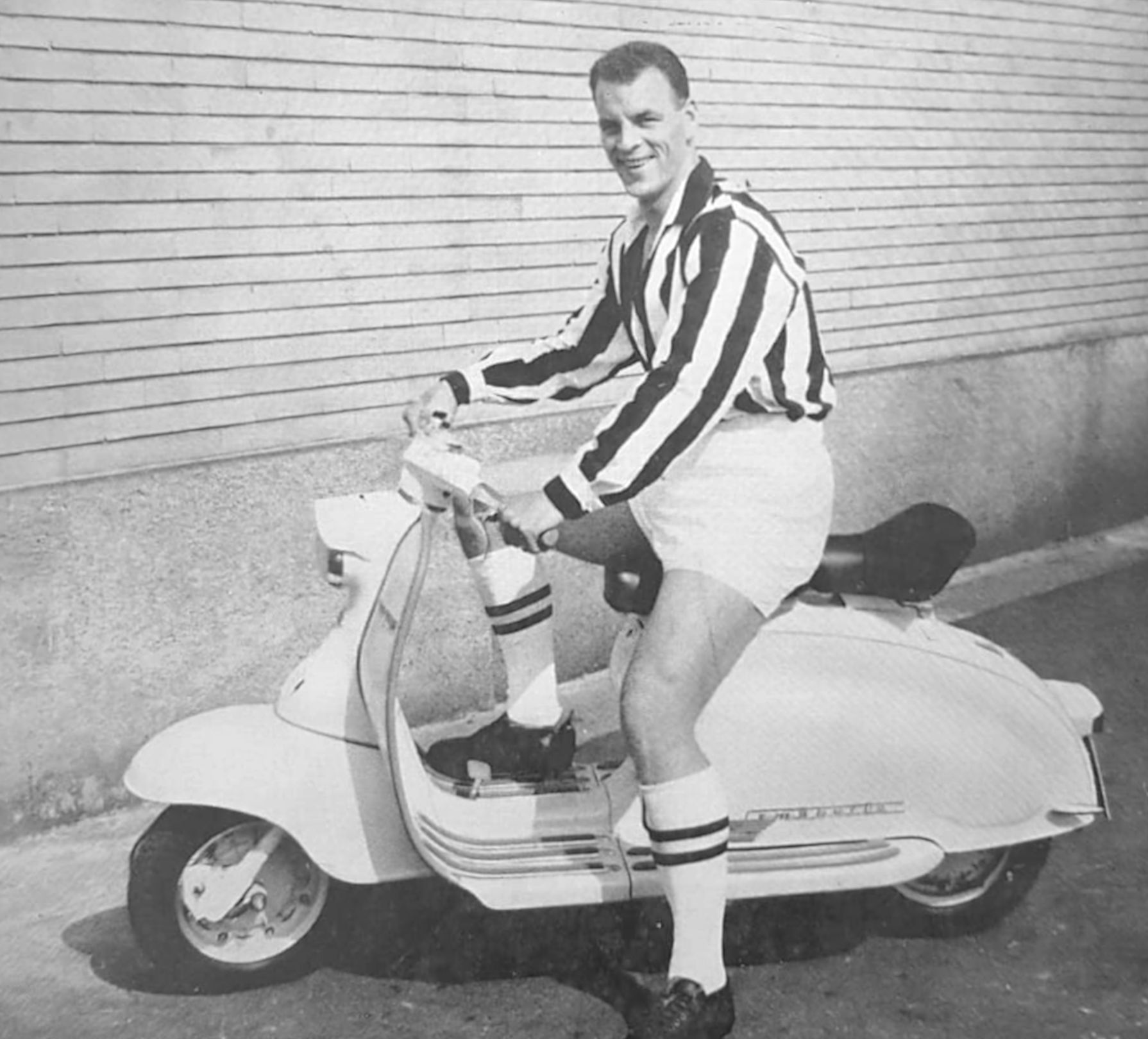
Welsh footballer John Charles posing with an Innocenti Lambretta LI 150 in 1958

There are still clubs across the world, both national and local clubs, devoted to the Lambretta scooter. The clubs still participate and organize ride outs and rallies which regularly take place during weekends over the summer months and have high attendance, some rallies achieve 2,500 paying rally goers. Across the UK there are many privately owned scooter shops which deal with everything Lambretta, from sales, services, parts, tuning, performance and complete nut and bolt restorations.

In Portuguese, "lambreta" is used as a synonym for "scooter", being listed at the Novo Dicionário da Língua Portuguesa, one of the Brazil's main dictionaries, as a noun/substantive.

The small village of Rodano, near Milan, hosts the biggest Lambretta museum in Europe and the Innocenti archives. In the collection are also several non-Lambretta scooters, including some first models from the 1910s and US Army scooters parachuted over Normandy in 1944.

In Weston-super-Mare, England, there is a Lambretta Scooter Museum which houses a total of around 100 Lambretta models – at least one from each year between October 1947 through May 1971, plus later models from Spanish and Indian factories. It also houses a large amount of Lambretta memorabilia. This museum and collection was sold in early 2007 and re-opened on 8 August 2008 following refurbishment.

In 1997 the UK-based Lambretta Clothing brand of clothing and accessories was founded. The company is currently part of Lambretta Consortium.

== Construction and models ==
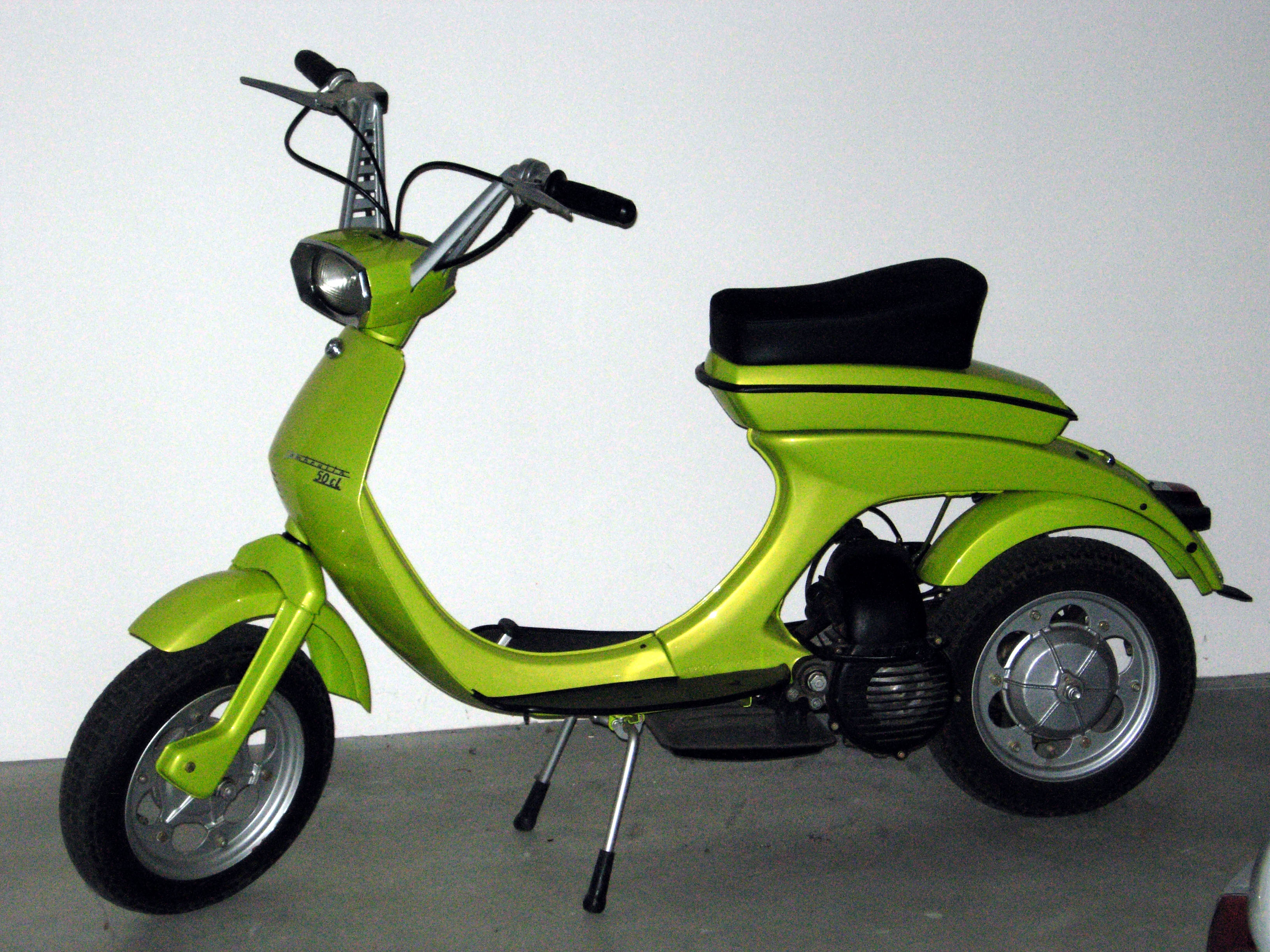
Lambretta Luna Range designed by Bertone

Lambrettas had three or four gears and two-stroke engines with capacities ranging from 49 cc to 198 cc. Most two-stroke engines require a mixture of oil with the gasoline in order to lubricate the piston and cylinder.

Unlike the Vespa, which was built with a unibody chassis pressed from sheets of steel, Lambrettas featured a more rigid tubular frame, although the Cento (produced 1964–1965) & "J" range models (produced 1964–1970) did have a monocoque body. Early versions were available in "closed", with fully covered mechanicals or "open", with minimal panels and thus looking like an unusual motorcycle. The model A and model B were only available in "open" style. The D models were noted for their torsion-bar rear suspension; at its peak, the D model outsold all other two-wheeled vehicles combined. (For the latter, see Ruth Orkin's famous photograph American Girl in Italy.) The much greater success of the "closed" version confirmed that riders wanted protection from the weather and a clean-looking machine.

Along with the Vespa, Lambretta was an iconic vehicle of the 1950s and 1960s when they became the adopted vehicle of choice for the UK youth-culture known as Mods. The character Jimmy from the influential scooter movie Quadrophenia rode a Lambretta Li 150 Series 3. Of the 1960s models, the TV (Turismo Veloce), the Special (125 and 150), the SX (Special X) and the GP (Grand Prix) are generally considered the most desirable due to their increased performance and refined look; the "matte black" fittings on the GP model are said to have influenced European car designs throughout the 1970s. The SX200, GP200 and TV models came with a front disc brake made by Campagnolo. The TV was the world's first production two-wheeled vehicle with a front disc brake.

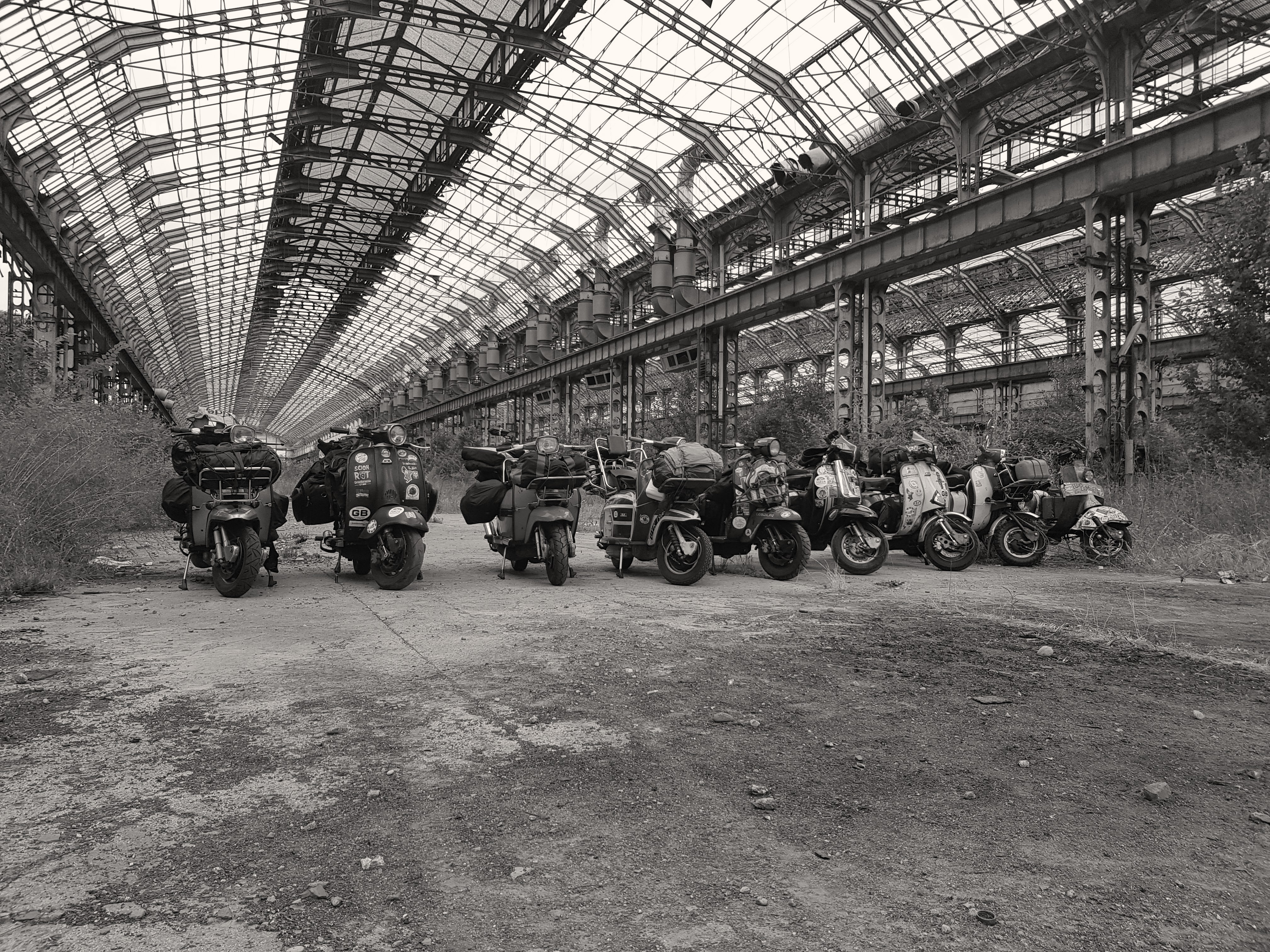
Lambretta scooters inside the derelict Innocenti Lambetta factory in Milan

As the race to be the first person on the moon gathered pace, Innocenti's new model was launched, the Luna range (Luna meaning "moon", in Italian). The machines looked very advanced for their day, reverting to the open frame style of the much admired "D" types, and although sales were slow to start with, racing success from grass-tracking to circuit-racing soon made them a sales success. Designed by Bertone Innocenti wanted a small frame and engine Lambretta that could be sold alongside the larger models. The frame had a tubular-steel front end, with bolt-on leg shields, and a monocoque pressed-steel rear frame.

Lambrettas have attracted an eclectic following of "revival" Mods, collectors, scooterists, cutdown enthusiasts, and even racers. Lambrettas can be converted to fun and relatively fast machines with little (but relatively expensive) modification. Many owners customize these scooters with elaborate aftermarket products and paintwork and attend well-organised scooter rallies. The Lambretta has benefitted from advances in technology from the motorcycle world. To boost performance some owners have fitted aftermarket cylinders and crankshafts that increase the swept volume to as much as 333 cc. Common modifications include a Nikasil plated aluminium barrel with radical porting, large Dell'Orto or Mikuni carburettors and bespoke expansion chambers. Hydraulic disc brakes in the front are becoming common on the more highly tuned machines, as are hydraulic clutches and rear brakes. Modern low-profile tyres greatly improve handling, as do uprated front and rear suspension units.

== Lambretta clubs ==
- Doncaster Hunters SC
- Scunthorpe silhouettes SC
- Ace of Herts
- Secret Servix Scooter Club
- Ratters Scooter Club, Normanton, West Yorkshire.
- Lambretta Club of Canada
- Lambretta Club Great Britain
- Lambretta Club of Australia
- LCUSA, Lambretta Club USA, Est. 2003

Frontline Scooter Club Redcar

== Timeline of models ==
Sources: Den of the Lambretta, Buyers Guide, Lambretta Club of Great Britain, British Lambretta Archives, Lambretta Official

=== Italy ===
==== Innocenti ====
- Model A, 1947–1948
- Model B, 1948–1950
- Model C & LC, 1950–1951
- Model D & LD, 1951–1958
- Model E, 1953–1954
- Model F, 1954–1955
- TV series 1, 1957–1959
- Li Series 1, 1958–1959
- Li Series 2, 1959–1961
- TV series 2, 1959–1962
- Li Series 3, 1961–1968
- TV/GT Range, 1962–1965
- Li Special, 1963–1969
- J Range, 1964–1971
- SX Range, 1966–1969
- Li Series 4, 1967–1968
- Lui/Vega/Cometa, 1968–1970
- GP/DL Range, 1969–1971

==== Innocenti S.A ====
V-Special, 2017–present

== Gallery ==
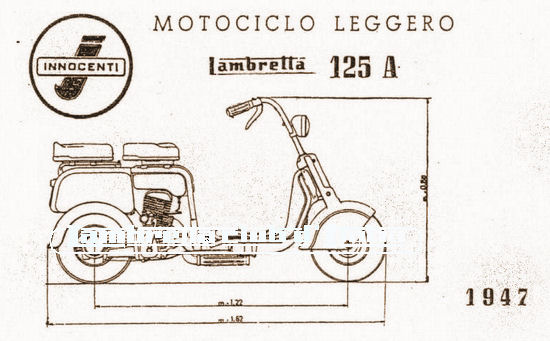
Original Lambretta Design by Cesare Pallavicino

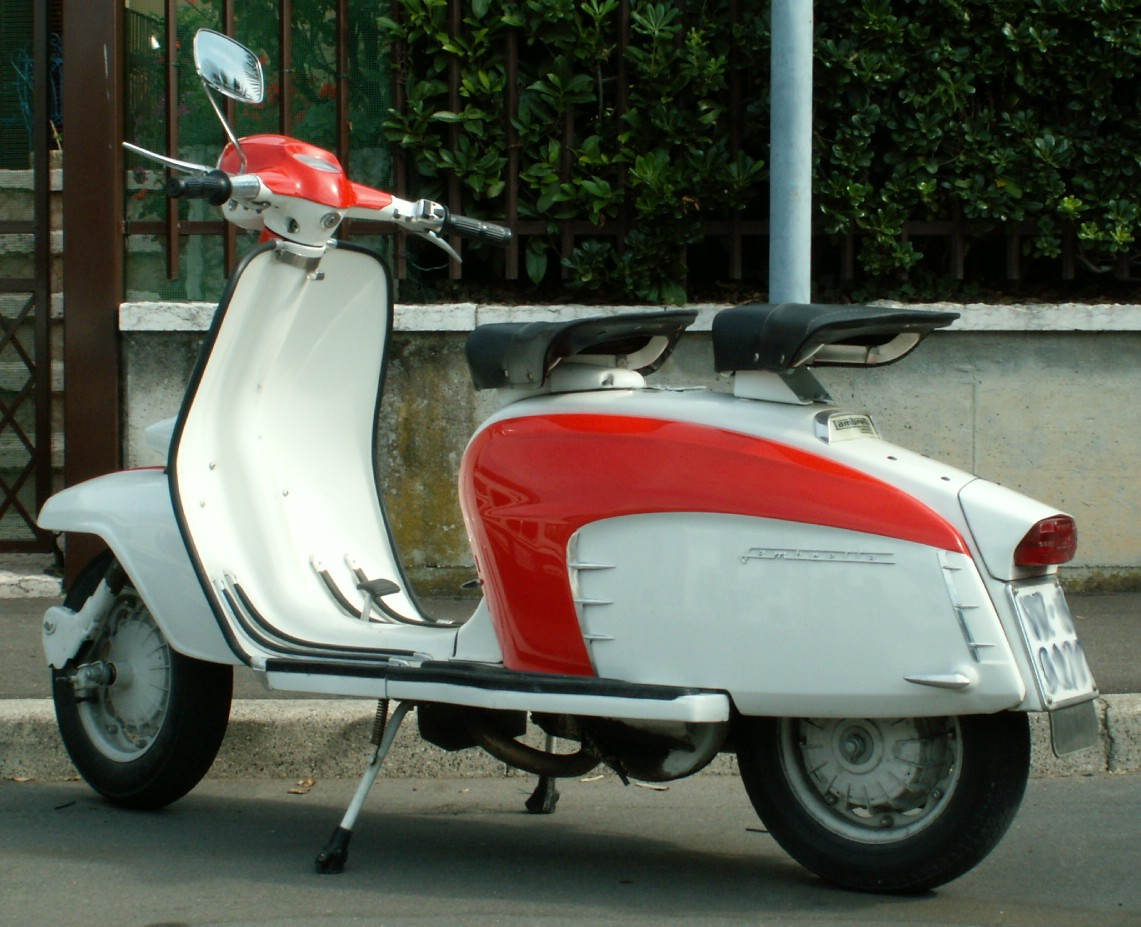
Lambretta GT 200

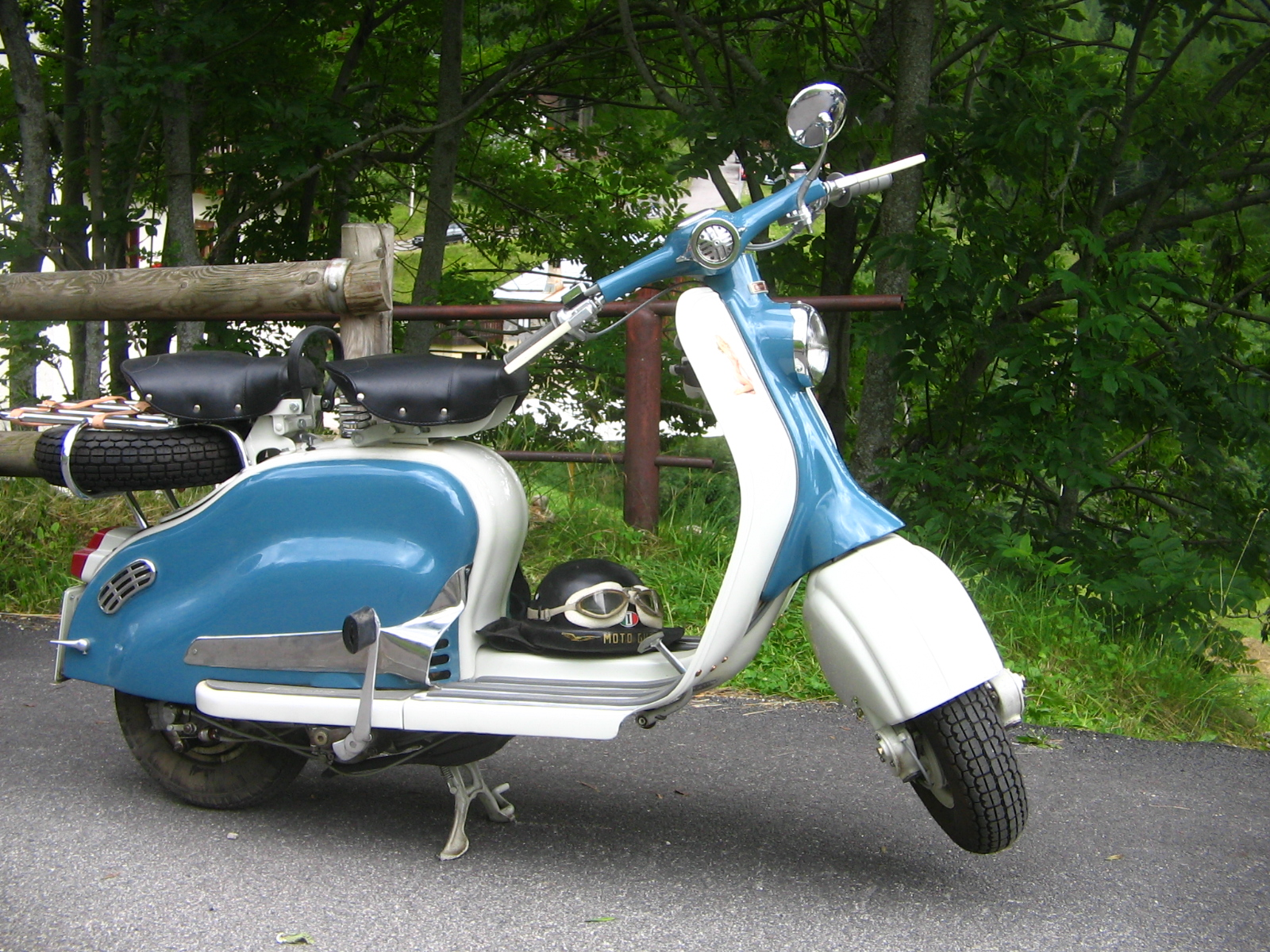
Lambretta 150 ld

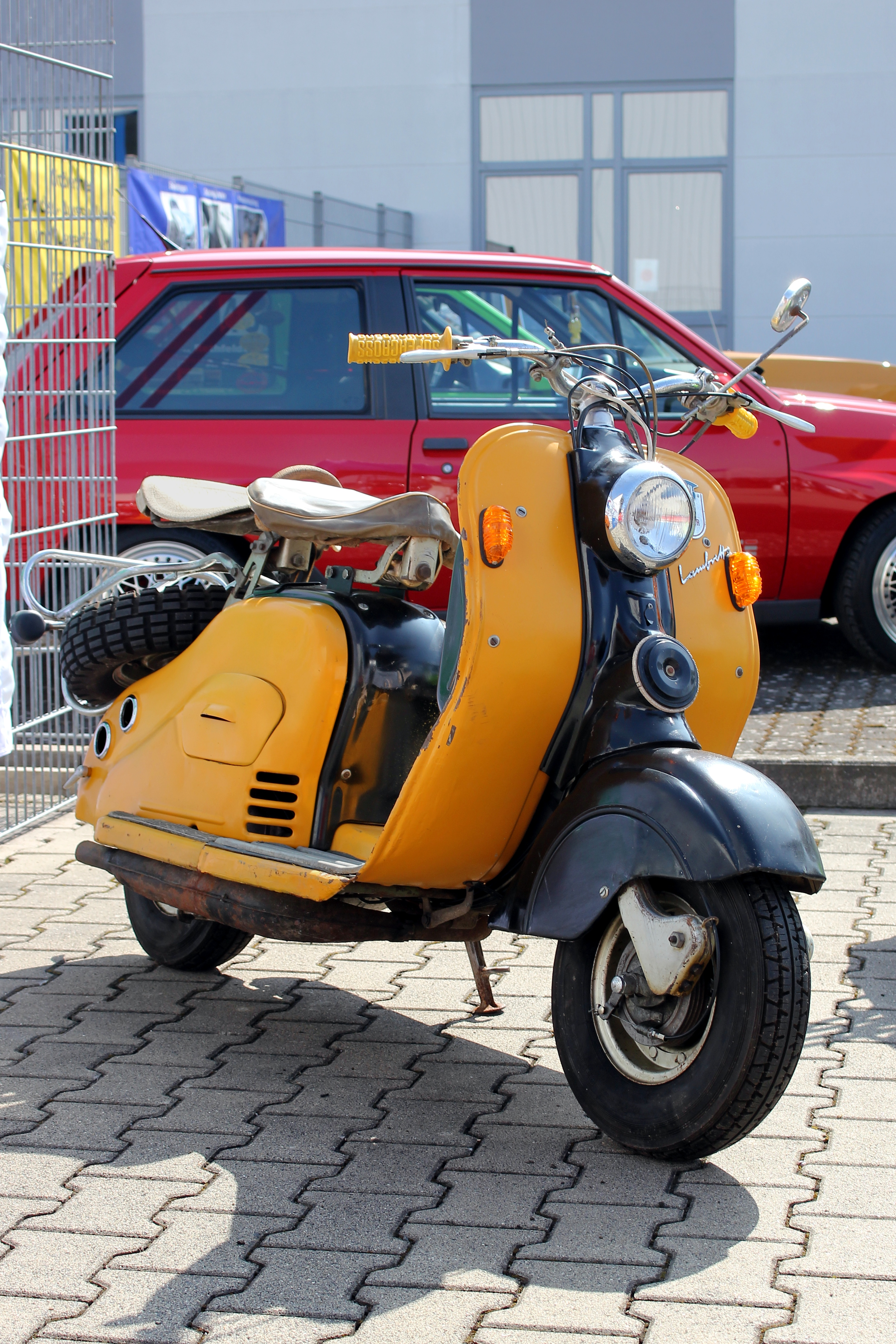
NSU Lambretta from 1955

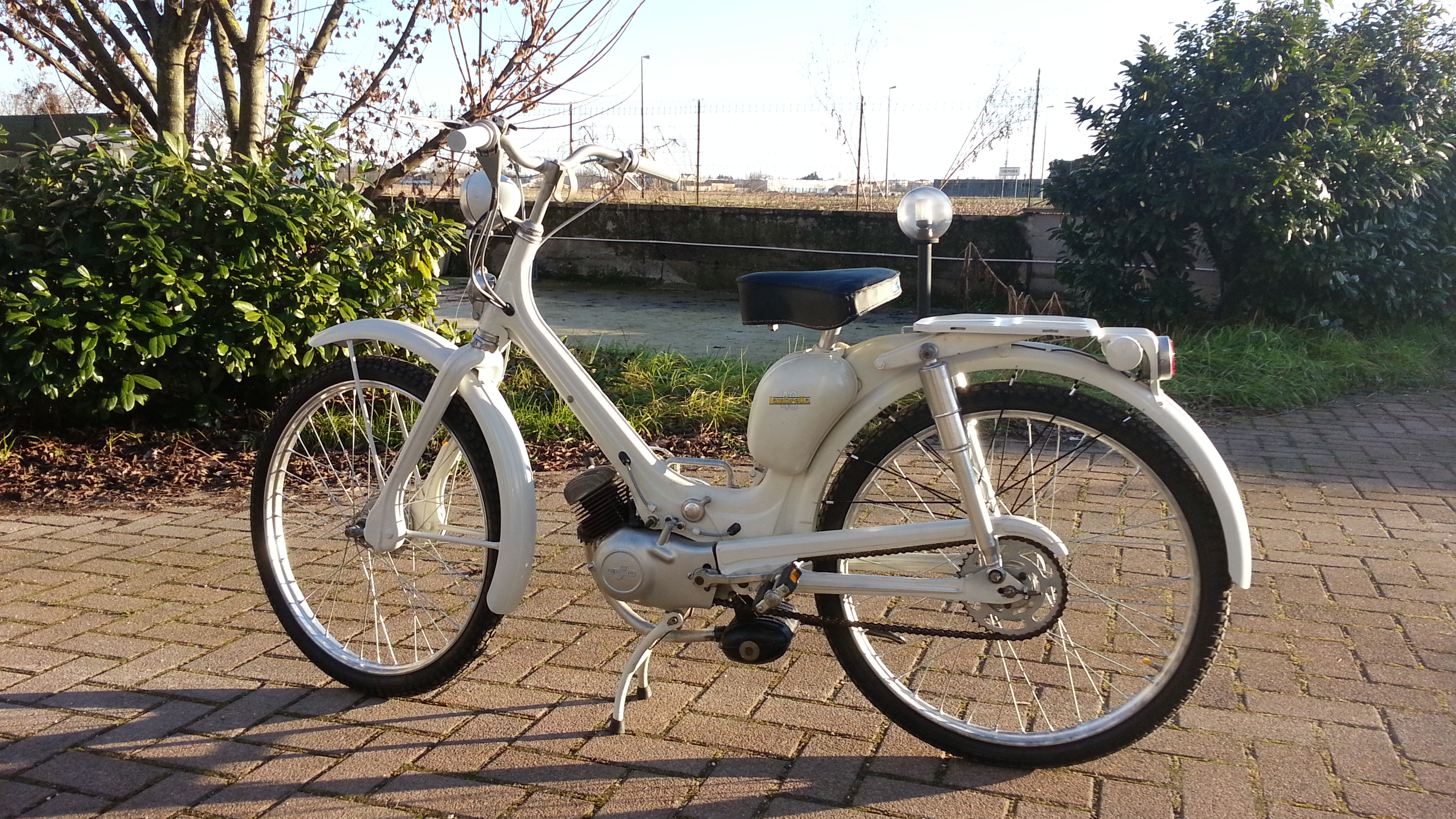
Lambretta 48 Moped

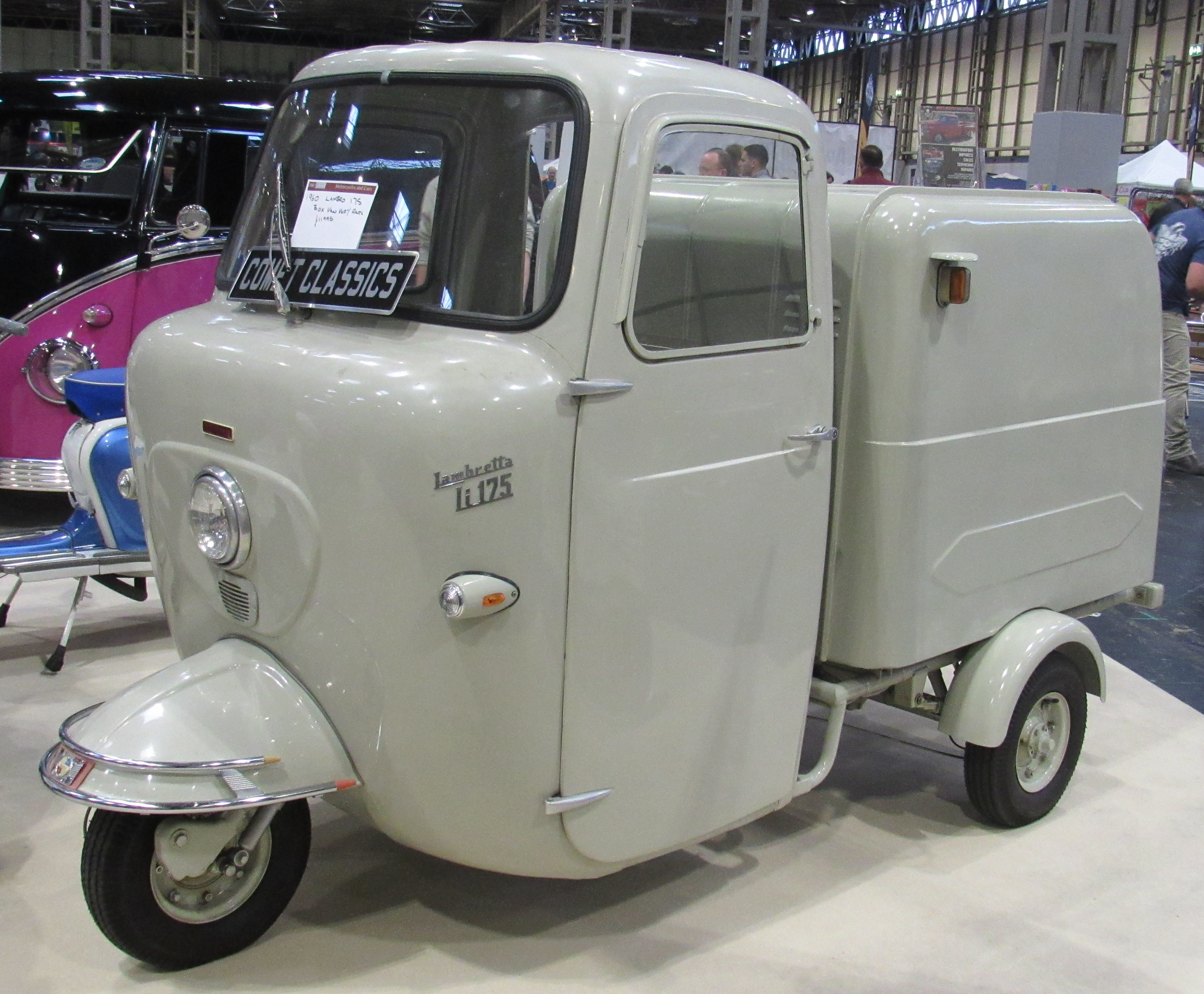
1960 Lambretta Li (Lambro) 175 Series 2

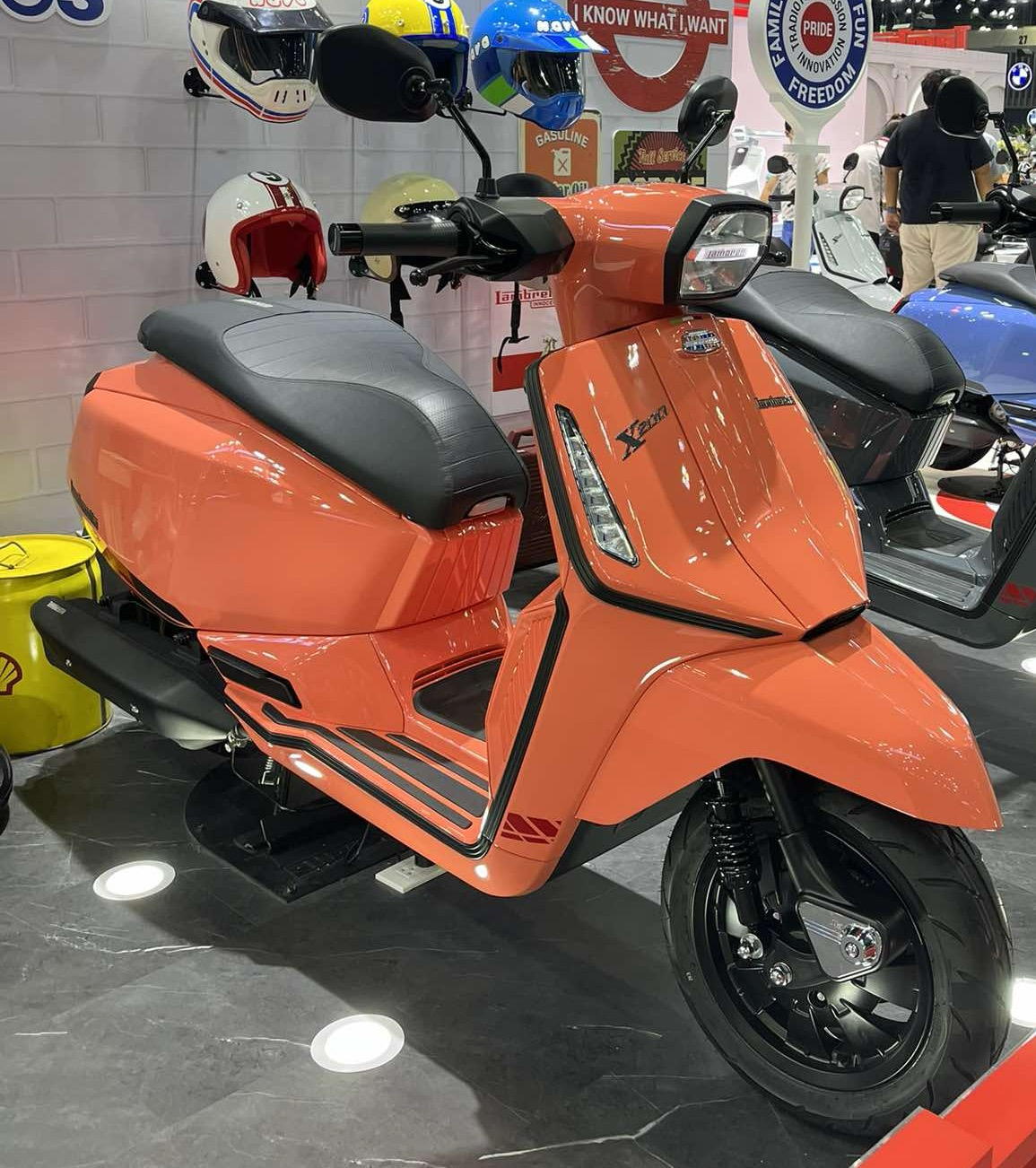
Lambretta X200 in Thailand

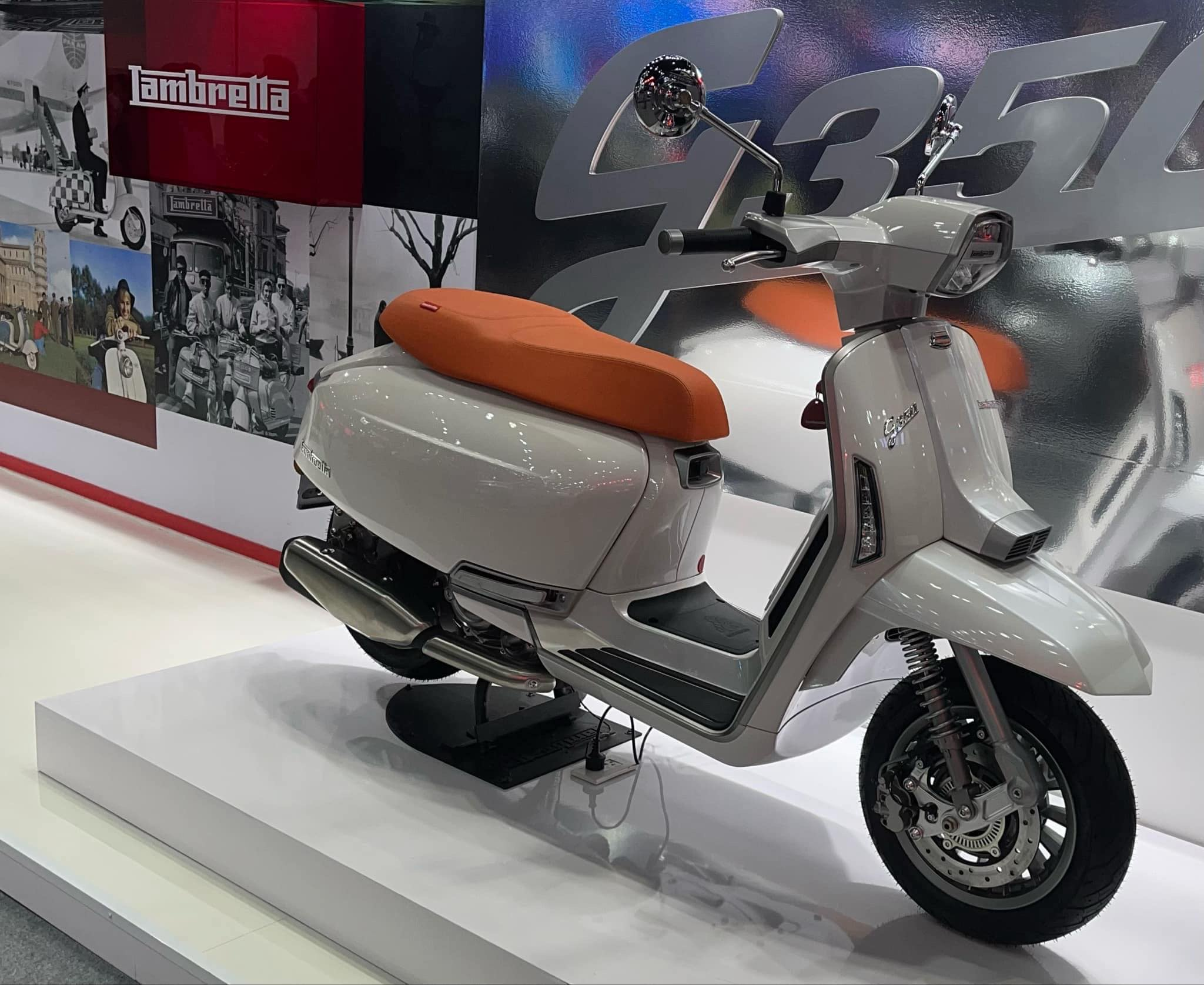
Lambretta G350 in Thailand

== Racing ==
=== Race results ===
Year	Class	Team name	Motorcycle	No.	Riders	Races	Wins	Podiums	Poles	F. laps	Points	Pos.
2010	125cc	Lambretta Reparto Corse	Lambretta 125	36	(Spain) Joan Perelló	1	0	0	0	0	0	NC
2010	125cc	Lambretta Reparto Corse	Lambretta 125	39	(Spain) Luis Salom	17	0	0	0	0	72	12th
2010	125cc	Lambretta Reparto Corse	Lambretta 125	52	(United Kingdom) Danny Kent	1	0	0	0	0	0	NC
2010	125cc	Lambretta Reparto Corse	Lambretta 125	55	(Spain) Isaac Viñales	2	0	0	0	0	3	25th
2010	125cc	Lambretta Reparto Corse	Lambretta 125	60	(Netherlands) Michael van der Mark	6	0	0	0	0	0	NC
2010	125cc	Lambretta Reparto Corse	Lambretta 125	72	(Italy) Marco Ravaioli	17	0	0	0	0	0	NC

== See also ==
- List of motor scooter manufacturers and brands
