= Lambretta TV200 =

Motor Scooter

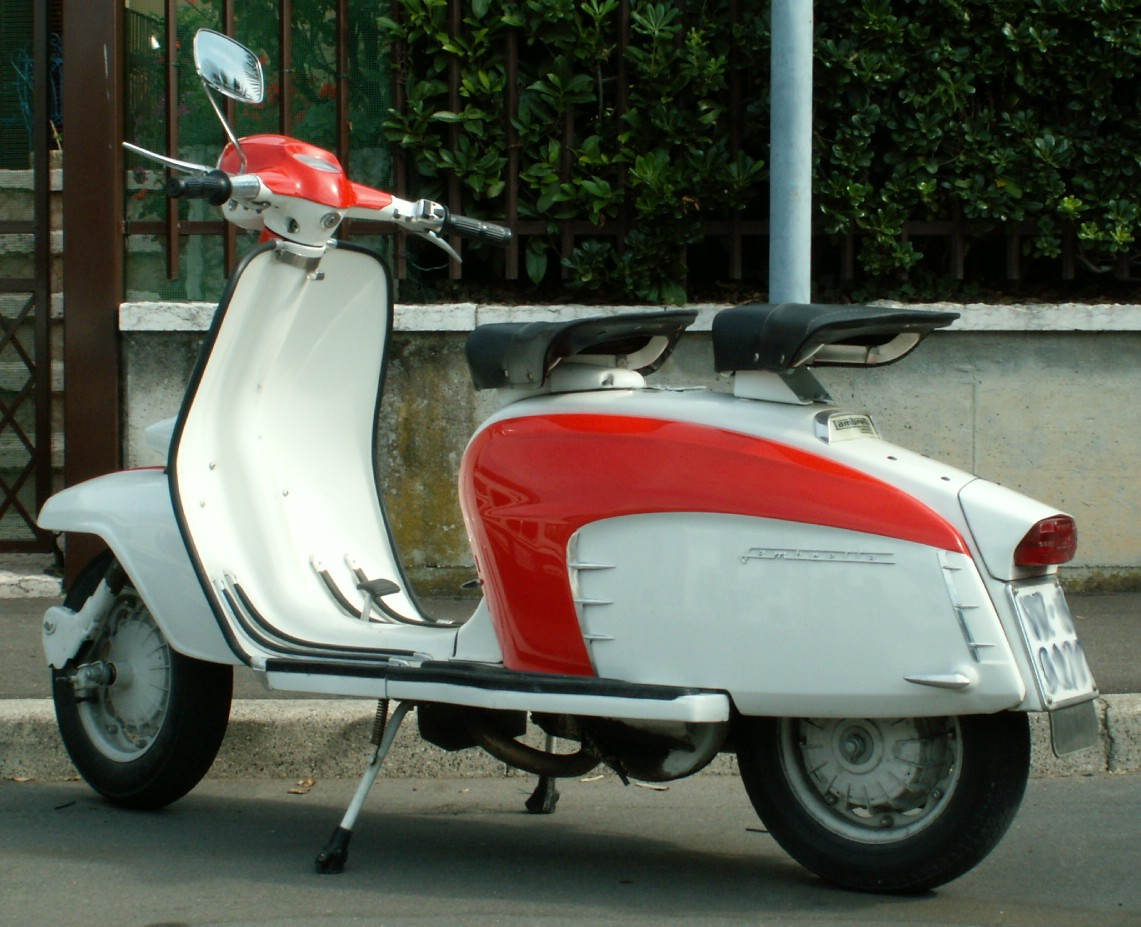

The Lambretta TV200 (or GT200 in the UK) was a two-stroke motor scooter produced by Innocenti from April 1963 to October 1965. During this time, 14,982 units were made for and exported to markets outside of Italy. It featured a bigger 200 cc engine and a new gearbox which were both improved for the following SX model. Disc front brake was introduced and carried over to the SX. It was badged as TV200 but was widely referred as GT 200.
