= Lambretta GP/DL =

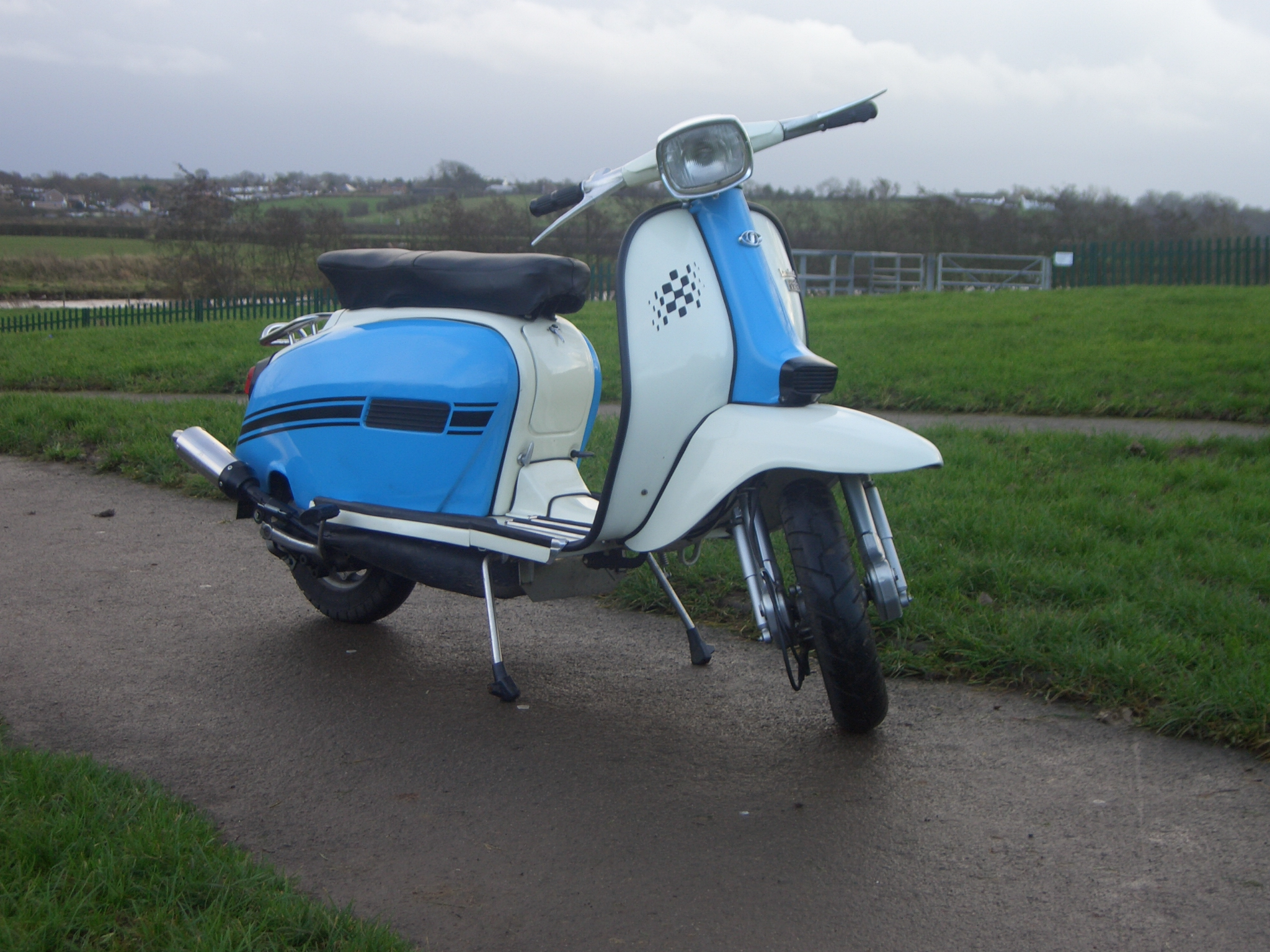
- Lambretta GP/DL
- Manufacturer: Lambretta
- Production: January 1969 – April 1971
- Predecessor: SX Range
- Successor: None
- Class: Scooter
- Engine: 125 cc (7.6 cu in), 150 cc (9.2 cu in) or 200 cc (12 cu in), two-stroke, single
- Bore / stroke: 52 mm × 58 mm (2.0 in × 2.3 in) (125cc) 57 mm × 58 mm (2.2 in × 2.3 in) (150cc) 66 mm × 58 mm (2.6 in × 2.3 in) (200cc)
- Ignition type: Electronic (late models)
- Transmission: 4-Speed manual, chain drive
- Frame type: Tubular
- Suspension: Front: sprung trailing links Rear: Shock absorber
- Brakes: Front: drum (125cc & 150cc), disc (200cc); Rear: drum
- Tyres: 3.50*10
- Dimensions: L: 1,800 mm (71 in); W: 680 mm (27 in); H: 1,012 mm (39.8 in)
- Fuel capacity: 8.1 L (1.8 imp gal; 2.1 US gal)

The Lambretta GP/DL range was the final range of classic Lambrettas to be produced before Innocenti was sold to British Leyland Motor Corporation in 1971. The range was called the DL in most countries, but was called the GP (standing for Grand Prix) in Britain and some other countries. This was to associate the scooters with Formula One which was extremely popular and successful in the late 1960s.

== History ==
The GP/DL range was designed by Bertone that was also acclaimed for designing several vehicles for Alfa Romeo, Lamborghini, Ferrari, and Fiat.

The GP/DL range was offered with three different engine sizes: 125cc, 150cc, and 200cc. The three versions were visually very similar in appearance, and were much more sporty looking in comparison to the Series 3 range which they replaced. The 200cc version was fitted with an internal disc brake and had improved front suspension due to additional front dampers being fitted. In April 1971, Italian production of GP/DL Lambrettas ended with the closure of the Innocenti factory in Milan. The Indian Government purchased the production rights and the tooling from Innocenti and continued production of GP/DL scooters under the Scooters India Ltd (SIL) brand until 1996, with only minor cosmetic changes, e.g. addition of indicators, made. However, the quality of these SIL produced Lambrettas never matched that of the Innocenti produced machines principally due to the lack of quality control procedures at the SIL factory and the degradation over time of the original press and form tools. As of 2017, limited spares for the GP/DL range are still manufactured by SIL; SIL makes complete engines/engine cases for the GP/DL 150/200. The production of body panels and frames has been discontinued by SIL. However, third party/non-OE body panels, cosmetic items, electrical items are still available in large quantities and qualities throughout India. As of 2017, there is a wide and increasing range of spares and performance upgrades available from various Italian and U.K. aftermarket providers, including more robust engine cases, larger capacity cylinder kits, a twin-cylinder 275cc engine, carburettors, exhaust systems, 5-speed gearboxes and hydraulic disc brakes and suspension systems.

== Design ==
The range was designed by Bertone and was made shorter with a rectangular headset and slimmer leg shields. It also had black trim and a new shaped mudguard to make the GP/DL look more sporting. Despite the revised styling, the new model still shared many inter-changeable parts with the earlier series III scooters. An ink splat was used as the logo for the DL, because it was reported that Bertone once threw down his ink pen in frustration of his designs not being appreciated – the resultant ink pattern being used as the logo, but in the United Kingdom the GP used a checkered flag. The GP Electronic was designed between Innocenti and Ducati and came with an electronic ignition. However, only approximately 200 were produced before production ceased. The GP came in turquoise, white, orange, red and yellow-ochre paint colours with panel colours either matching or red or blue in contrast.
