= Guarini =

Guarini is a surname. Notable people with the surname include:

- Alessandro Guarini (c. 1563–1636) Italian writer, jurist and diplomat of the late Renaissance; son of Giovanni Battista Guarini; sometimes called "Guarini the Younger"
- Alessio Guarini (born 1985), Italian long-jumper
- Alfredo Guarini (1901–1981), Italian filmmaker
- Anna Guarini, Contessa Trotti, (1563–1598), Italian virtuoso singer of the late Renaissance
- Carmen Guarini (born 1953), Argentine anthropologist
- Francesco Guarini (bishop) (died 1569), Bishop of Imola
- Francesco Guarino or Guarini (1611–1651 or 1654), Italian painter of the Baroque period
- Frank Joseph Guarini (1924–2026), American politician
- Giovanni Battista Guarini (1538–1612), Italian poet and diplomat
- Giovanni Luigi Guarini (died 1579), Bishop of Aquino
- Guarino Guarini (1624–1683), Italian architect and Theatine priest
- Justin Guarini (born 1978), American singer who rose to fame on the television show American Idol
- Marco Antonio Guarini (1570–1638), Italian historian and scholar
- Maurizio Guarini (born 1955), Italian rock musician
- Raimondo Guarini (1765–1852), Italian scholar and man of letters

== See also ==
- Guarani (disambiguation)
