= Guarani =

Guarani, Guaraní or Guarany may refer to

== Ethnography ==
- Guaraní people, an indigenous people from South America's interior (Brazil, Argentina, Paraguay and Bolivia)
- Guarani language, or Paraguayan Guarani, an official language of Paraguay
- Guarani dialects, spoken in Argentina, Brazil, Bolivia, and Paraguay
- Guarani languages, a group of languages, including Guarani, in the Tupí-Guaraní language subfamily
- Eastern Bolivian Guaraní language, historically called Chiriguanos, living in the eastern Bolivian foothills of the Andes. Also called Ava Guarani.

== Economics ==
- Paraguayan guaraní, the currency of Paraguay

== Geography ==
- Guarani, Minas Gerais, Brazil
- Guarani de Goiás, Brazil
- Guarani das Missões, Rio Grande do Sul, Brazil
- Guarani Aquifer, a large underground water reservoir in South America

== Literature and music ==
- The Guarani, an 1857 novel by José de Alencar
- Il Guarany, an opera by Carlos Gomes, based on the above novel
- Guarany (film), a 1948 Italian film directed by Riccardo Freda

== Machines ==
- FMA IA 50 Guaraní II, an Argentine utility aircraft
- VBTP-MR Guarani, a Brazilian 6x6 armored personnel carrier

== Association football (soccer) clubs ==
Brazil

- Guarani Esporte Clube (CE), Juazeiro do Norte
- Guarani Esporte Clube (MG), Divinópolis
- Guarani FC, Campinas
- Guarany Alagoano, renamed Murici Sport Clube
- Guarany Futebol Clube, Bagé
- Guarany Futebol Clube (Camaquã)
- Guarany Sporting Club, Sobral
- Associação Atlética Guarany, Porto da Folha
- Esporte Clube Guarani, Venâncio Aires
- Sociedade Esportiva, Recreativa e Cultural Guarani, Palhoça
- Sport Club Guarany, Cruz Alta

Paraguay

- Club Guaraní, Asunción
- Guaraní F.B.C., Trinidad

== Astronomy ==
- Guarani, official name of exoplanet HD 23079 b

== People ==
- Horacio Guarany (1925–2017), Argentinian singer & writer

== See also ==
- Guarini (disambiguation), an Italian name
