= Marco Antonio Guarini =

Italian historian and scholar

Marco Antonio Guarini (Ferrara 1570 – 1638) was an Italian historian and scholar, nephew of Giovanni Battista Guarini and author of the Compendio Historico and of the Famiglie illustri della città di Ferrara.

== The Compendio Historico ==
His principal work is the Compendio Historico, also known as:

Compendio Historico dell'Origine, Accrescimento, e Prerogative delle Chiese, e Luoghi Pij della Città, e Diocesi di Ferrara, E delle memorie di que' Personaggi di pregio che in esse son sepelliti: In cui incidentemente si fa menzione di Reliquie, Pitture, Sculture, ed altri ornamenti al decoro così di esse Chiese, come della Città appartenenti. Opera non meno curiosa che dilettevole Descritta per D. Marc' Antonio Guarini Ferrarese, Beneficiato nella Catedrale, A' Santi Giorgio e Maurelio Martiri Protettori della Città, ed al Commune di lei dedicata.

— Marco Antonio Guarini

In his work, Guarini cites Ugo de' Pagani:

Vogliono che fossero sepelliti alcuni soggetti di memoria degni, ed in particolare quel Ugo Pagani, il quale per quanto rifferisce Guglielmo Arcivescovo di Tiro diede principio insieme con altri all'ordine de' Cavallieri Templari.

— Marco Antonio Guarini, Compendio Historico, p. 224

And also Raffaella Aleotti:

Sì come sovra ogn'altra singolarissima, e senza pari è in toccar d'Organo Raffaella Aleotti detta l'Argenta, la quale è anco intendentissima della musica, e di lei si veggono alle stampre pubblicati diversi motetti, e madrigali riputati molto.

— Marco Antonio Guarini, Compendio Historico, p. 376

== Bibliography ==
- Guarini, Marco Antonio. Famiglie illustri della città di Ferrara (in Italian). Ferrara.
- Guarini, Marco Antonio (1621). Compendio Historico (in Italian). Ferrara: Vittorio Baldini.
- Borsetti, Andrea (1670). Supplemento al Compendio Historico del Signor D. Marc'Antonio Guarini Ferrarese (in Italian). Ferrara: Giulio Bolzoni Giglio.
- Fontanini, Giusto; Zeno, Apostolo (1753). Biblioteca dell'eloquenza italiana (in Italian). Vol. 1. Venice: Giambattista Pasquali. p. 418.
- Tasso, Torquato; Guarini, Battista (1812). L'Aminta, e l'amor fuggitivo – Il pastor fido (in Italian). Vitarelli.
- Moiraghi, Mario (2005). L'italiano che fondò i Templari (in Italian). Milan: Àncora.

== See also ==
- Giovanni Battista Guarini
- Giammaria Mazzucchelli
- Giusto Fontanini
- Raffaella Aleotti
- Hugo de Paganis
