= Raimondo Guarini =

Italian archaeologist, epigrapher, poet, and teacher

Raimondo Guarini (1765–1852) was an Italian archaeologist, epigrapher, poet, college president, and teacher. He was born on May 12, 1765, in Mirabella Eclano, in the province of Avellino, Campania, Italy, the second of three sons born to upper middle class parents-Angelo and Rosaria Guarini. Raimondo and his younger brother Rafaelle entered the Dominican Order, while the third brother, Dominic Antonio, attended medical school. Both Raimondo and Rafaelle, after obtaining their educations, were forced to leave the Order when many of the religious houses in Southern Italy were being closed due to government suppression. Raimondo had risen in the Order to the rank of Abbot. Meanwhile, his older brother, with whom he shared his love of archaeology and epigraphy was becoming a well-known and successful medical doctor in Naples.

In Naples, Raimondo continued to pursue his studies, obtaining first a teaching position at the local college and later, in 1829, the presidency of the Accademia Pontaniana. His students were usually the children of the wealthy nobility. Some of his students and friends included Ferdinand I, Ferdinand II, and Maria Christina of the Kingdom of the Two Sicilies royal family and other of their children. When not teaching, Raimondo found time for his greatest love. This was his archaeological and epigraphical research both at home and in the field. This research was the fuel for his teaching. The discovery of ancient artifacts often in situ, and the analysis of them was the thrill in his life. Raimondo visited so many sites and walked so many places that his fellow townsmen called him "Il Pedatore" ("The Walker")

Guarini wrote portions of the Corpus Inscriptionum Latinarum on Campania and Samnium. Raimondo also worked at and on items found at Pompeii, and one of his most important works deals with life in that ancient city. In addition, he was often consulted for his expert opinion in classical matters and worked on the Royal Collections at Naples, such as The Bourbon Museum. Guarini corresponded and collaborated with other classical scholars and archaeologists of the time, including German archaeologists August Emil Braun and Eduard Gerhard, and German classical scholar and Nobel Laureate Theodor Mommsen. The debates with Mommsen were legendary in their time. Guarini was also a pioneer in the study of the Oscan language. He was a first to create an Oscan/Latin Dictionary. His other works, numbering close to one hundred, range from brief monographs to books. Many of his works can be found today in the libraries of larger colleges and universities (Princeton, Harvard, Yale, Duke, Columbia etc.). By far, the largest collection of his works may be found at the Vatican Library in Rome. Guarini played an important role in the popular Classical Movement of the 1800s, centered at Naples in Southern Italy, after the rediscovery of Pompeii. He died on January 8, 1852, at Naples. A secondary school, Scuola Secondaria Di 1° Grado Statale "R. Guarini" in his hometown of Mirabella Eclano, was named in his honor.
