= Lambretta Li Special =

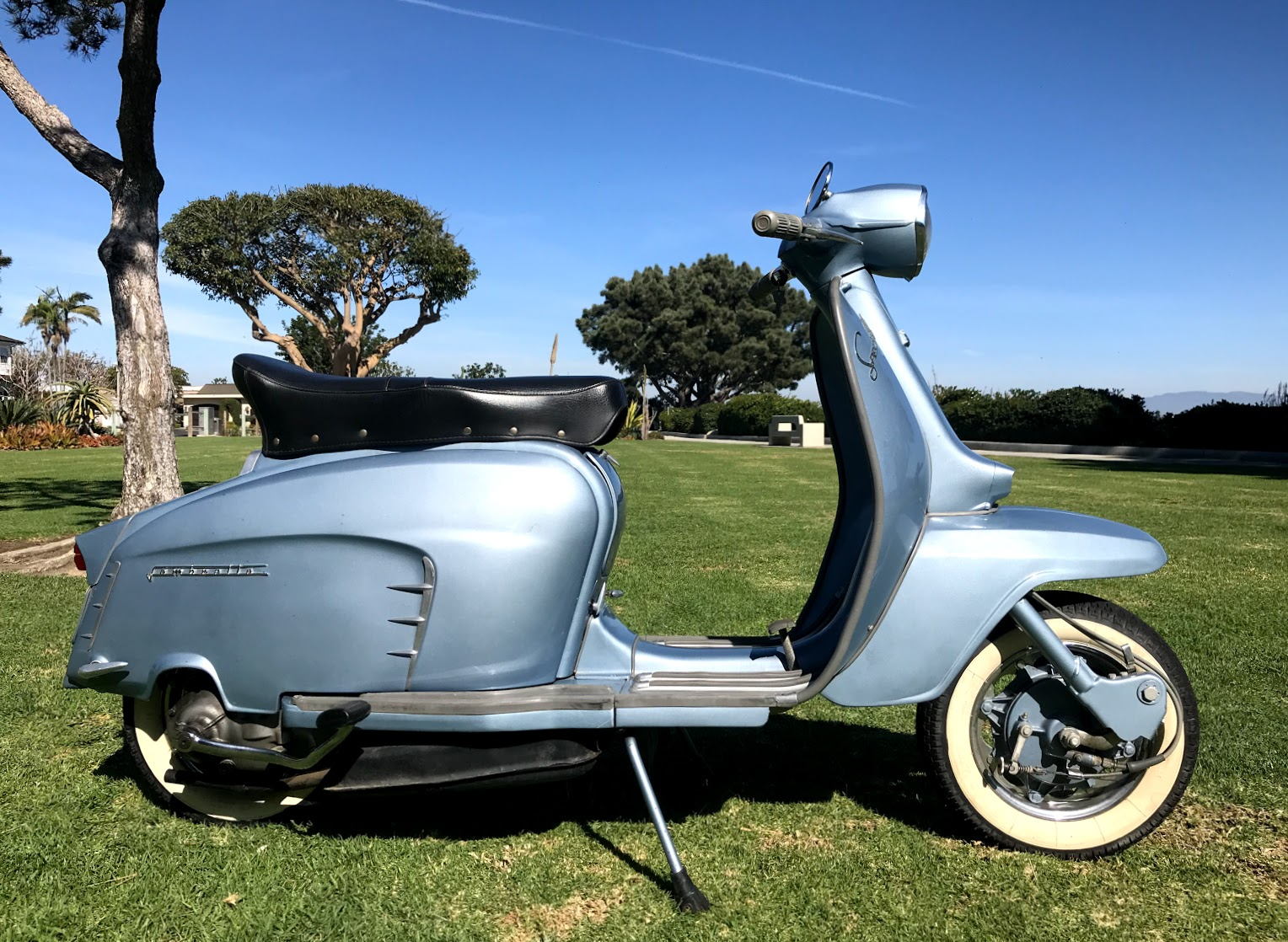
- 1966 Lambretta Li 125 Special
- Manufacturer: Innocenti
- Production: 125 Special: 1965–1969; 150 Special: 1963–1966
- Class: Scooter
- Engine: 125 Special - 123 cc (7.5 cu in) 2-stroke, air-cooled, single 150 Special - 148 cc (9.0 cu in) 2-stroke, air-cooled, single
- Bore / stroke: 125 Special - 52 mm × 58 mm (2.0 in × 2.3 in); 150 Special - 57 mm × 58 mm (2.2 in × 2.3 in)
- Compression ratio: 125 Special - 8:1; 150 Special - 7.5:1
- Top speed: 125 Special - 48 mph (77 km/h) 150 Special - 58 mph (93 km/h)
- Power: 125 Special - 7.12 hp (5 kW; 7 PS) @ 5500 rpm 150 Special - 8.25 hp (6 kW; 8 PS) @ 5600 rpm
- Frame type: Tubular frame
- Suspension: Front: Telescopic fork Rear: Shock absorber
- Brakes: Front - drum Rear - drum
- Tires: 3.50*10 (front and rear)
- Dimensions: L: 1,800 mm (71 in); W: 700 mm (28 in)
- Weight: 110 kg (242.5 lb) (dry)
- Fuel capacity: 8.0 L (1.8 imp gal; 2.1 US gal)

The Lambretta Li Special was made from 1963 to 1969 by Italian manufacturer Innocenti based in Milan. It was introduced as a sportier version of the Lambretta Li Series III but cheaper than the Lambretta TV series III.

== History ==
The Li 150 Special came first in September 1963 and was introduced to help cope with the demand for faster scooters, while staying as a 150 cc (9.2 cu in), by having a new barrel, head and reworked gearbox. The Li 150 Special was marketed as the 'Pacemaker' in the United Kingdom by Lambretta Concessionaires. In October 1965 The Li 125 Special began production, mainly aimed at a younger market the 125 Special had similar improvements to on the standard Li as its 150 alternative with a reworked barrel head and gearbox, but also having a larger 20mm carburettor. In 1965 after two years of production Lambretta released the Sliver and Golden Special.

== Design ==
=== Li Special ===
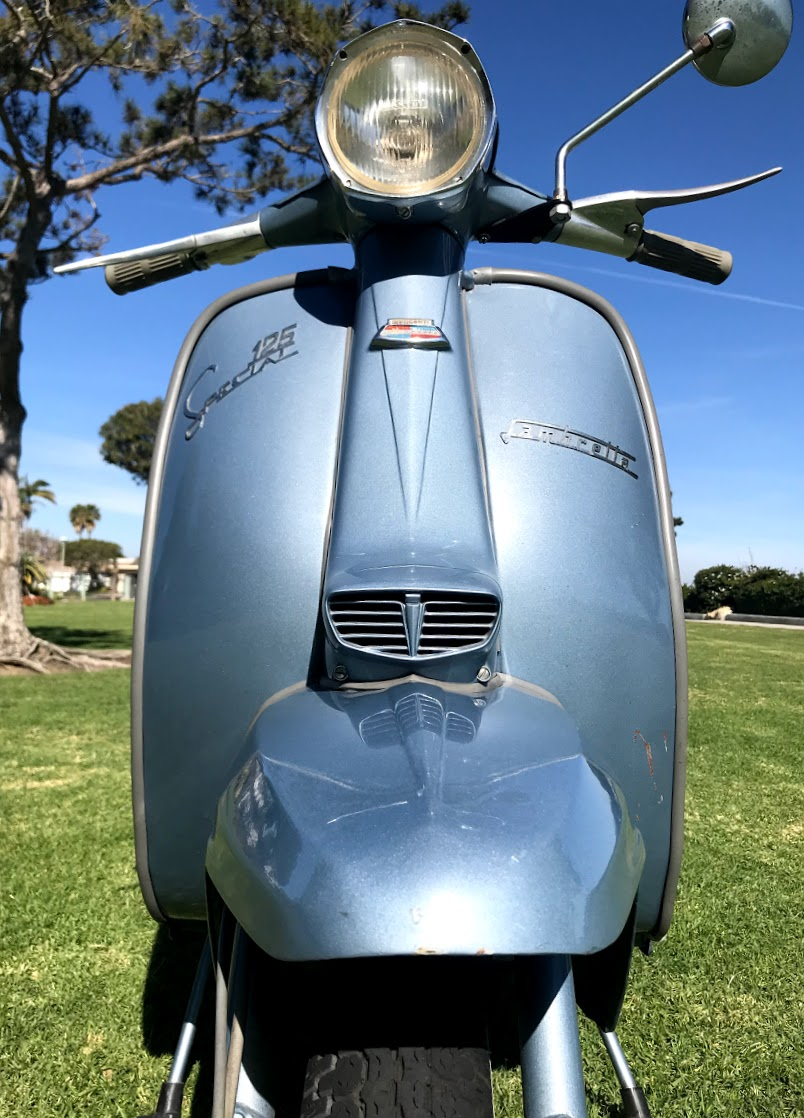
Li 125 Special showing Octagonal Headlamp in Metallic Blue paint

The Li Special was designed to fill the gap in the market between the Li Series III and TV Series III and was given revised styling like the reworked TV Series III. The Li Special changed its headset to the Octagonal style as well as having a more squared-off front mudguard, slimmer and lower horn casting and the new side panels with front and rear 'finger flashes'. Later models removed the chrome ring between the handle bars and leg-shield.

==== Colour schemes ====
125 Specials came in Metallic Blue 8061 and White Thorn 8082, in later examples. The 150 Special came in White, Green, Red and Blue. All internal bodywork parts were painted in New White 8059. The Silver Special came in Metallic Grey 8060 and the Golden Special came in Light Metallic Gold 8063.

== Tuning improvements ==
The 150 Special was introduced in 1963 as a sportier alternative to the standard Li 150. The compression ratio was increased from 7:1 to 7.5:1 giving the special 8.25 bhp (6 kW) over the standard 150's 6.6 bhp (5 kW). The introduction of the 125 Special brought with it a further compression ratio increase up to 8:1 producing 7.12 bhp (5 kW) over the 5.5 bhp (4 kW) of the standard Li 125. The 125 Special along with the SX150 and SX200 featured a larger 20 mm Dell'Orto carburettor over the 18 mm carburetor found on the 150 Special. Although the 150 Special had a higher top speed the tuning improvements along with a new gearbox, which would later wind up in the DL/GP range of scooters, gave the 125 Special an advantage in acceleration.

== Gallery ==
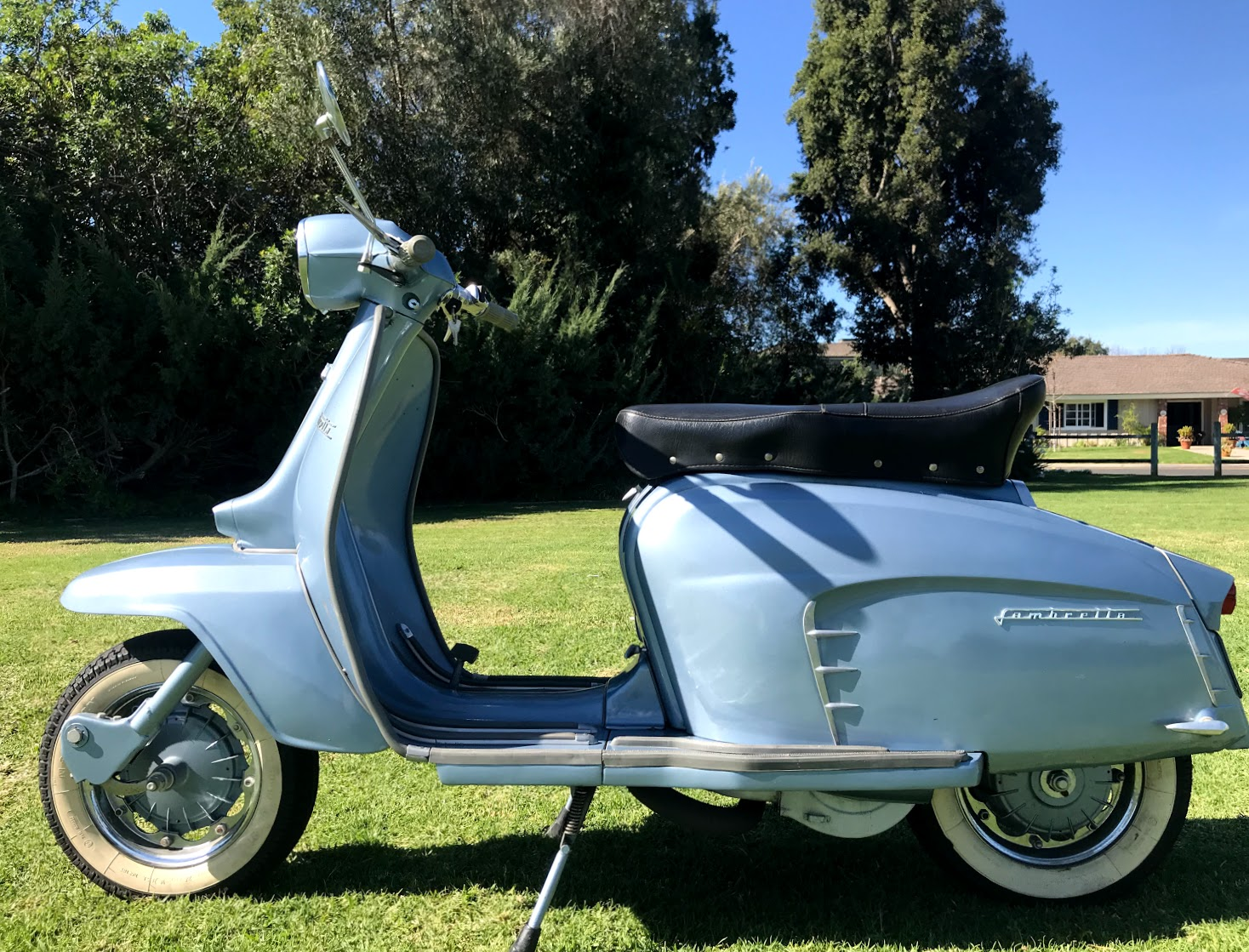

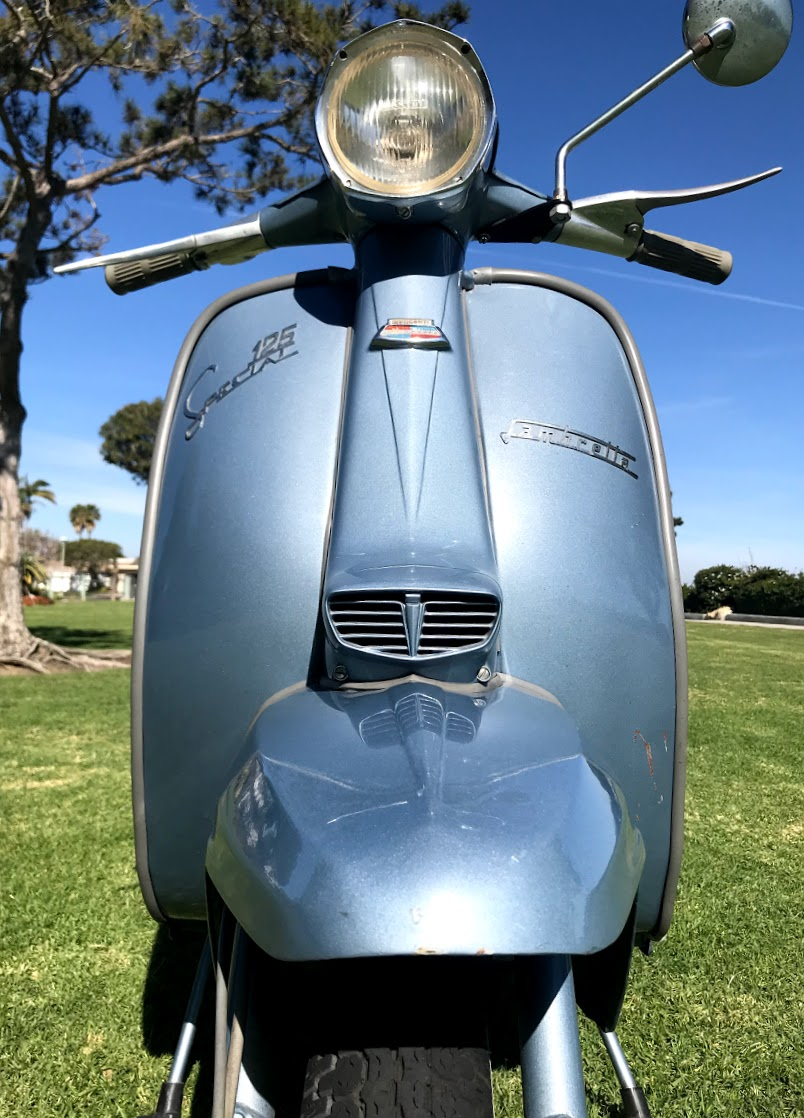

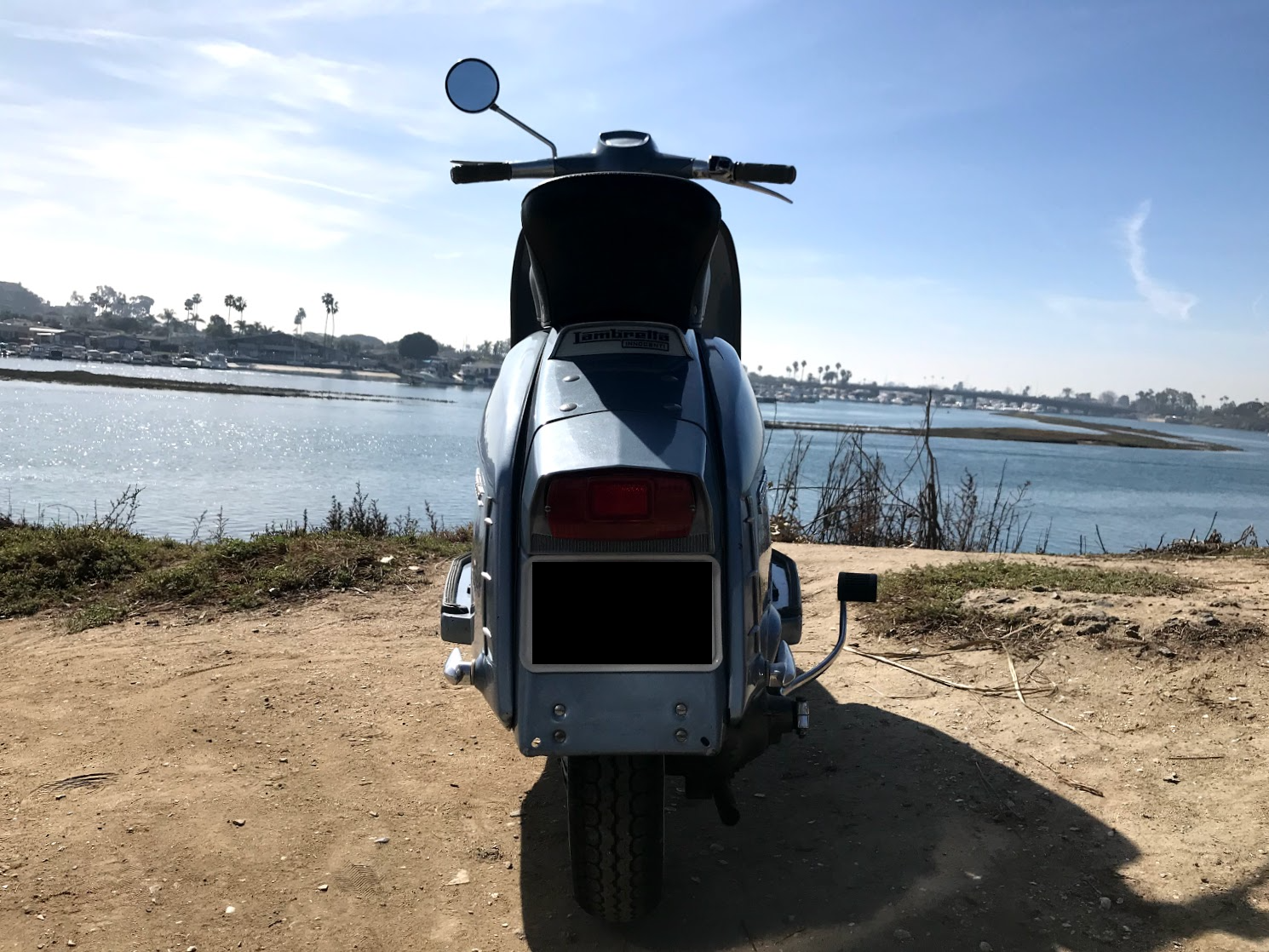

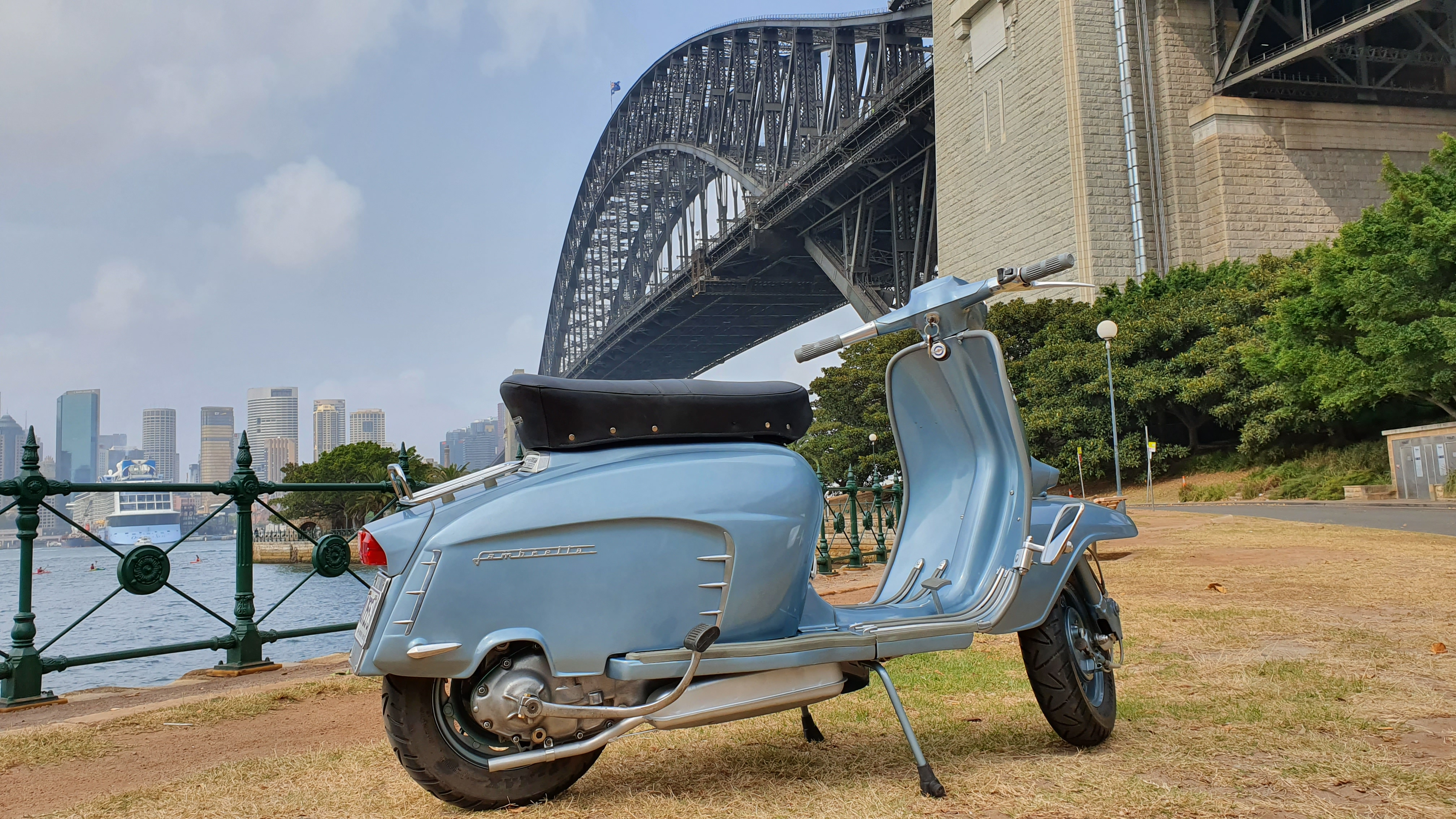
1967 Lambretta 125 Special
