= Lambretta Model B =

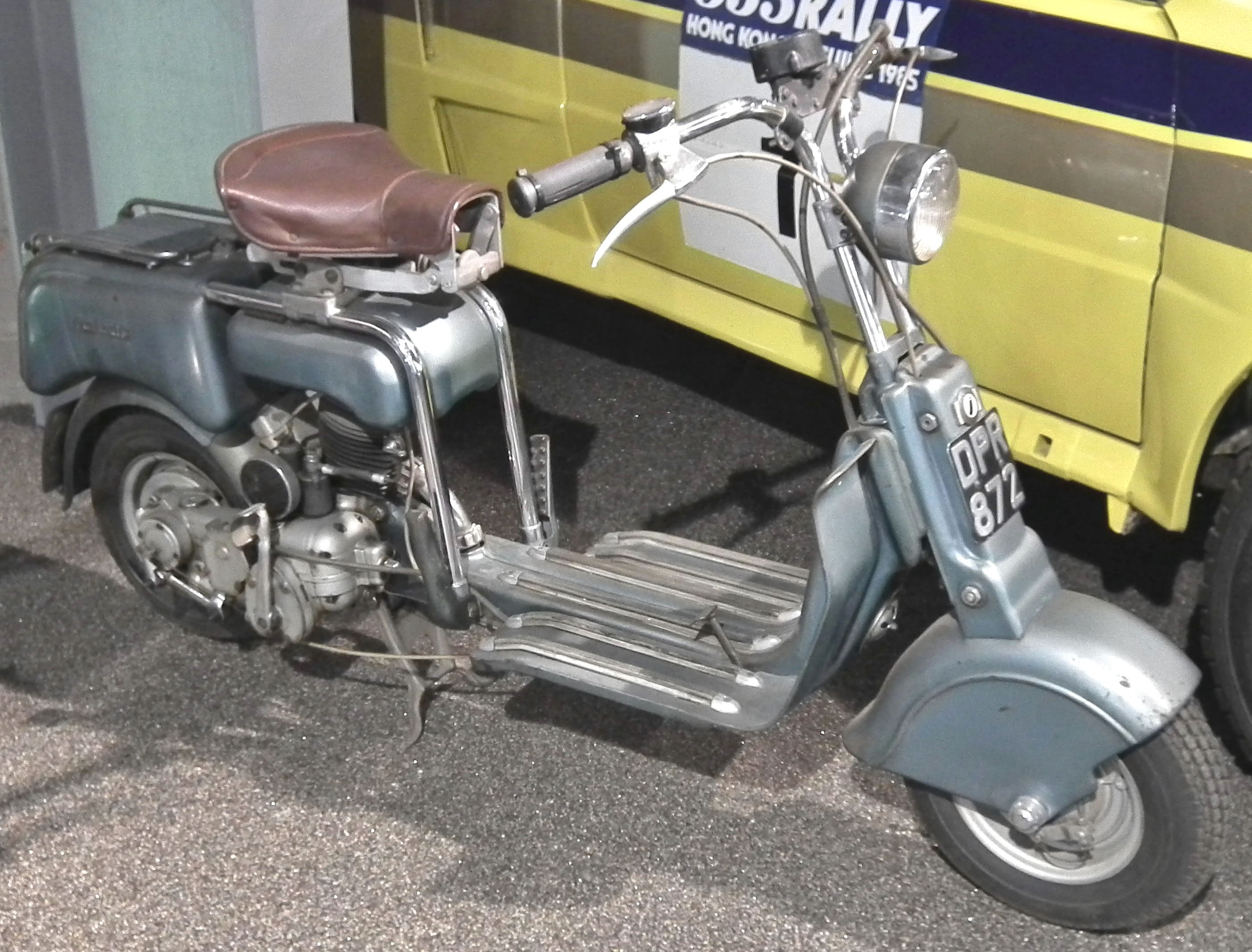
- 1948 Lambretta B at the National Motor Museum in Beaulieu, Hampshire, England
- Manufacturer: Lambretta
- Production: 1948-1950
- Predecessor: Lambretta Model A
- Successor: Lambretta Model C
- Class: Scooter
- Engine: 123 cc, Two Stroke, Single Cylinder
- Bore / stroke: 52mm x58mm
- Top speed: 44 mph (71 km/h)
- Power: 4.3 hp (3 kW; 4 PS)
- Transmission: 3 Speed, Handlebar Twist Grip
- Suspension: Spring Suspension (front & rear)
- Brakes: Drum
- Tyres: 3.50*8
- Dimensions: L: 1680mm W: 650mm H: 900mm
- Weight: 60kg (dry)
- Fuel consumption: 110 mpg_{‑imp} (2.6 L/100 km; 92 mpg_{‑US})

The Lambretta Model B was the second production model of Lambretta scooters, produced from November 1948 to January 1950. It was similar to its predecessor, the Lambretta Model A but was refined to improve the ride. It was made because of the success of the Model A.

== Overview ==
After the success of the Model A Ferdinando Innocenti needed a refined bike so the Model B was very similar to its predecessor. The main aim was to improve ride quality and comfort while keeping the scooter a low cost form of transport. It was just as simple as the Model A, but the improvements mean it cost more. The Model B was more successful than the Model A selling 35,014 units compared to the 9,669 units of the A.

== Design ==
The Model B is a more refined version of its predecessor the Model A. Its main improvement is in the suspension; the front and rear now has spring suspension, and there is a horizontally mounted coil spring damper on the engine to allow the rear of the engine to pivot. The handle bars have been moved forward and the saddle has been raised, allowing for a larger fuel tank for a more comfortable riding position. The gear changes had been made easier with a handlebar gear changer, which will become standard on all future models. It also had a legshield-mounted speedometer. The tyres were made bigger for greater ride quality, from 3.50*7 to 3.50*8.

== Sales and Production ==
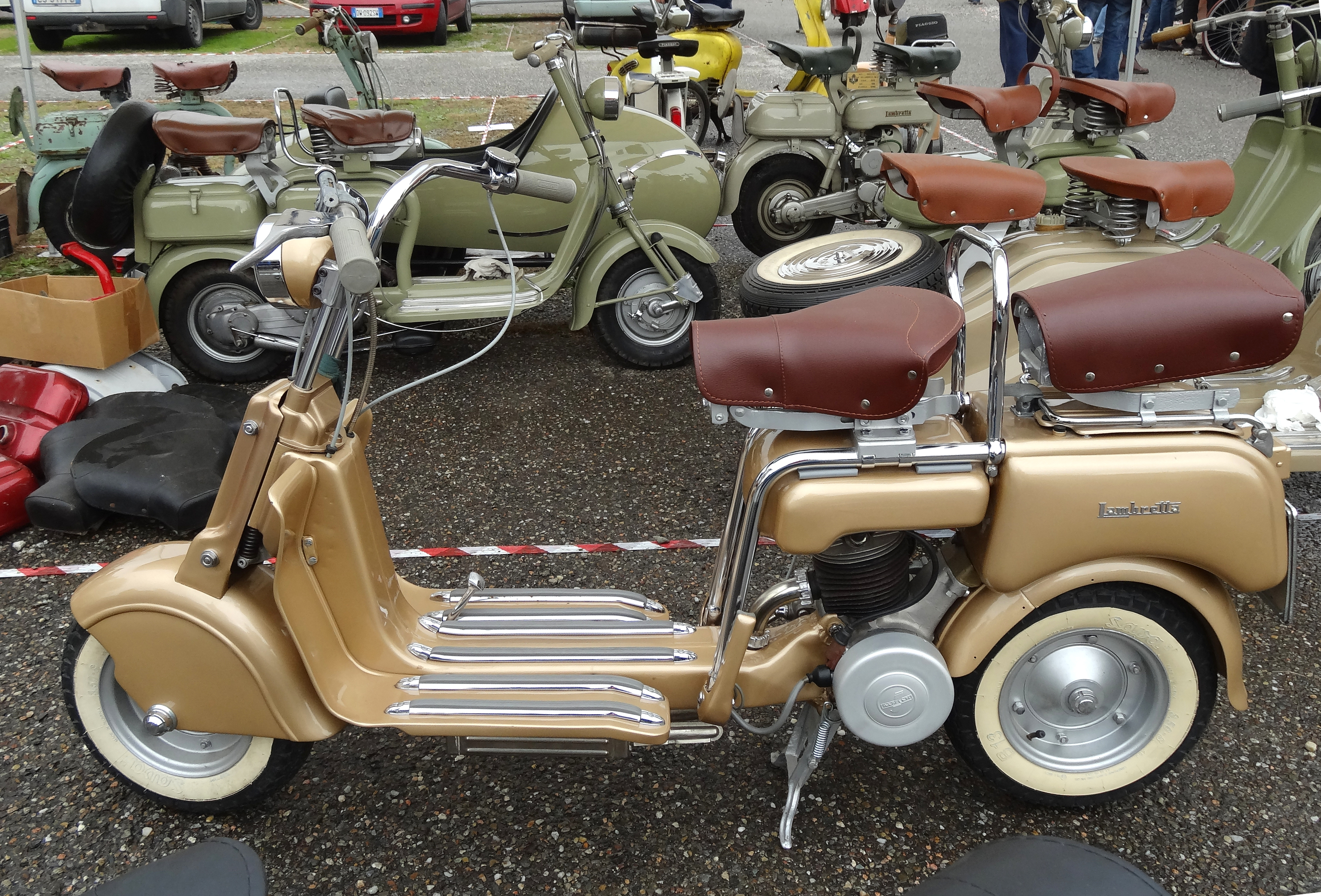
Lambretta Model B

Production of the Model B lasted 15 months, and was over three times greater and three months longer than the Model A.

Date and Year	Production
November–December 1948	1,854
January–December 1949	31,320
January 1950	1,840
Total	35,014

== See also ==
- List of motorcycles of the 1940s
