= Lambretta 48 =

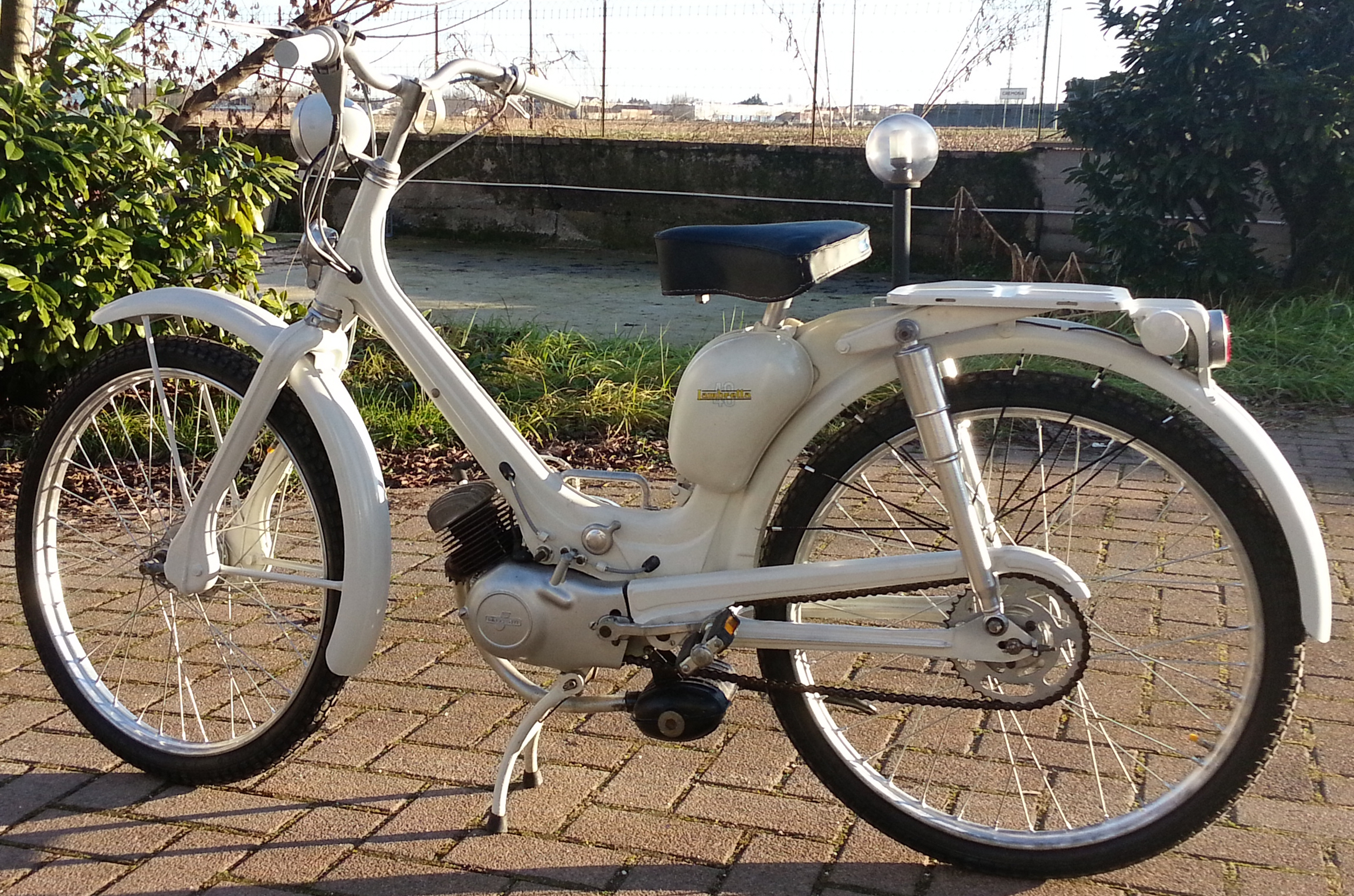
- Lambretta 48
- Manufacturer: Innocenti
- Engine: 48 cc (2.9 cu in), two stroke, single cylinder alloy head, Dell'Orto T5/11S Carburettor
- Bore / stroke: 40 mm (1.6 in) x 38 mm (1.5 in)
- Power: 1.7 bhp at 5,000 rpm
- Ignition type: Magneto, F70 spark plug
- Transmission: Two-speed gearbox, 1/2 x 0.205 inches rear chain
- Suspension: Trailing-link front fork; trailing fork at rear with twin telescopic spring units
- Brakes: 4 in (100 mm) diameter drum front and rear, 7/8 width friction material linings
- Tyres: 2.00 x 22 inches
- Wheelbase: 42 in (1,100 mm)
- Weight: 44 kg (97 lb) (dry)

The Lambretta 48 was a single-seat, 48 cc moped built by Innocenti from 1954. First introduced at the 1954 Milan Show, it was exhibited at Earls Court, London in 1956, and had a two-speed transmission with rear suspension.

The moped market during the 1950s was dominated by the highly successful NSU Quickly, and the Lambretta 48 was withdrawn from the UK market in 1959.

The Lambretta 48 was also produced in India under the name API Lambretta, being assembled in India from kits supplied by parent-business Innocenti in Italy.

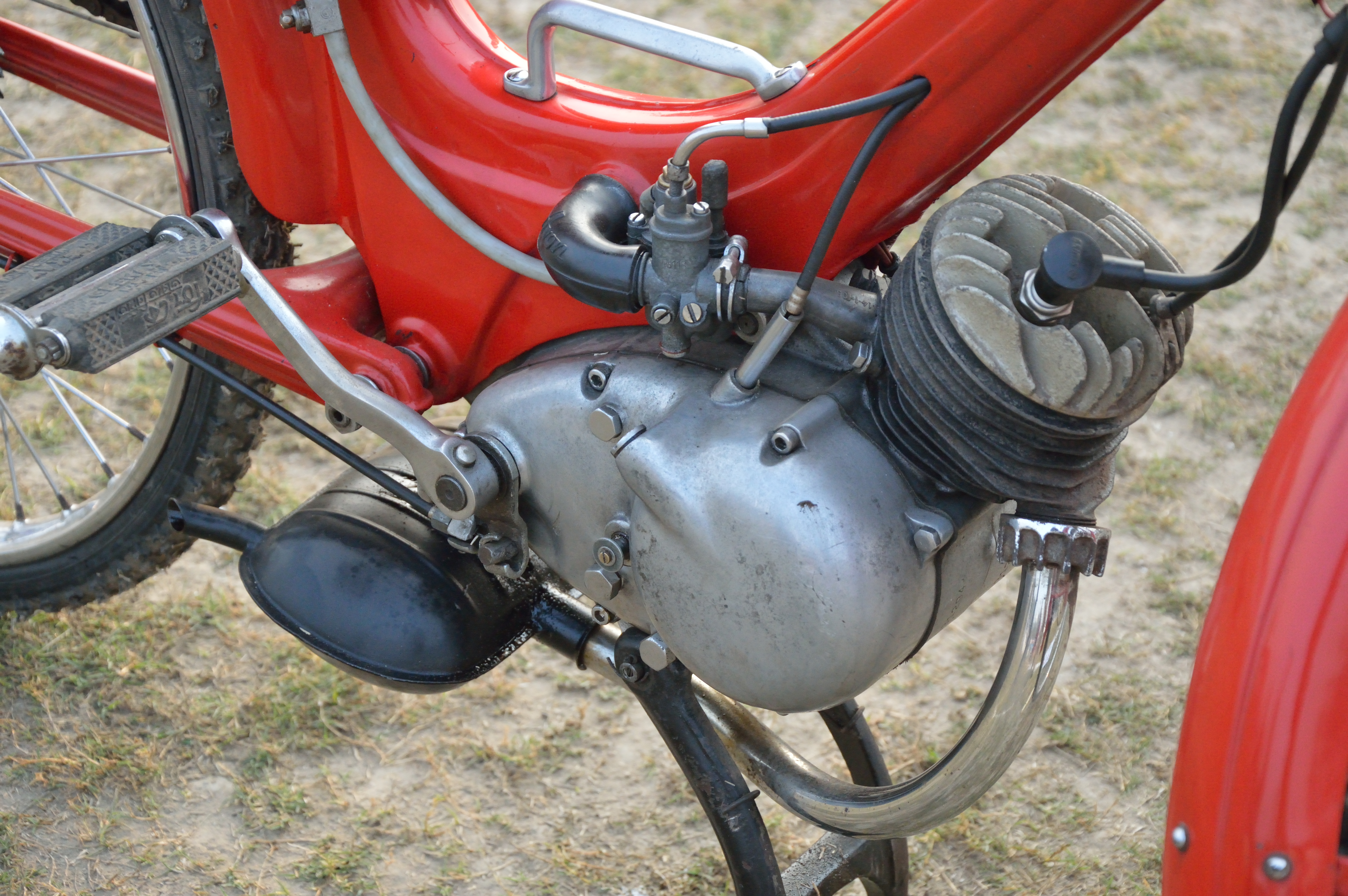
The engine of an Indian-made API Lambretta

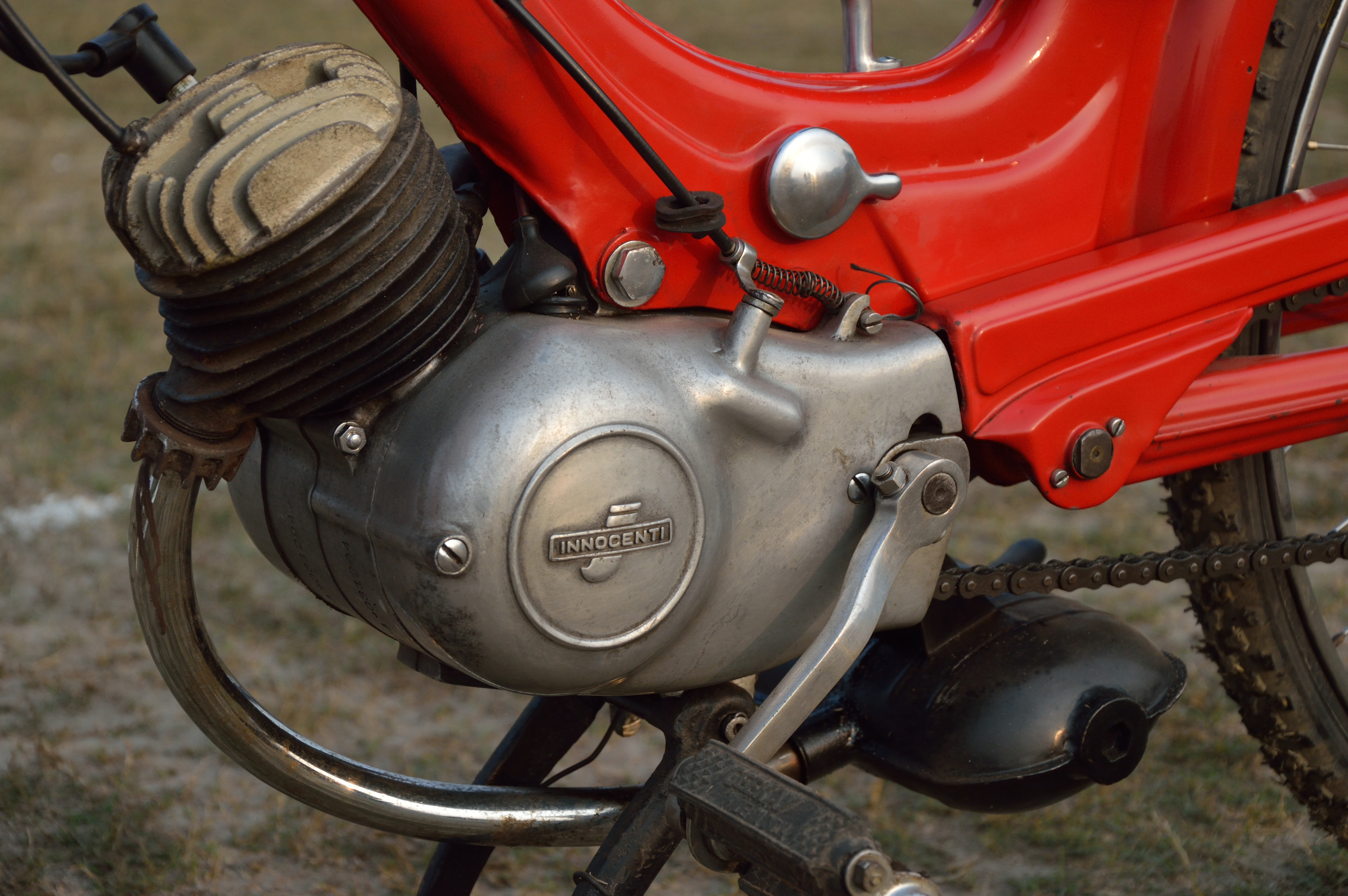
Left side of engine

== Successor ==
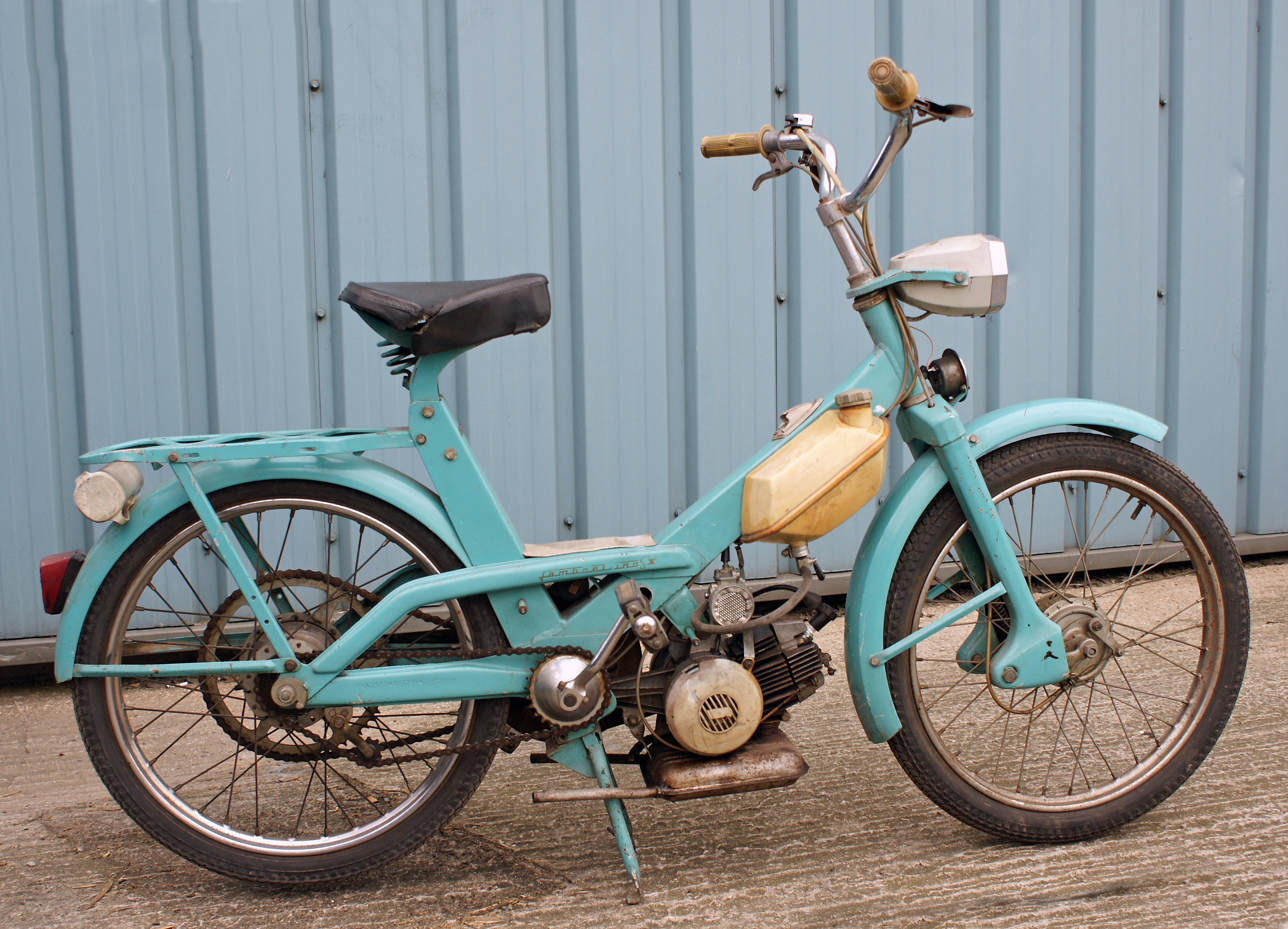
Lambrettino moped

The Lambrettino, an updated design using a rigid spine frame with a coil-sprung single seat and 39 cc (40 x 31 mm) engine, was introduced for the 1966 model year. Having a single-speed transmission with automatic (centrifugal) clutch, 18 x 2.00 inch tyres and weighing 90 lb (41 kg), the maker claimed a top speed of 24 mph returning an overall fuel consumption of 200 mpg.
