= Innocenti 186 GT =

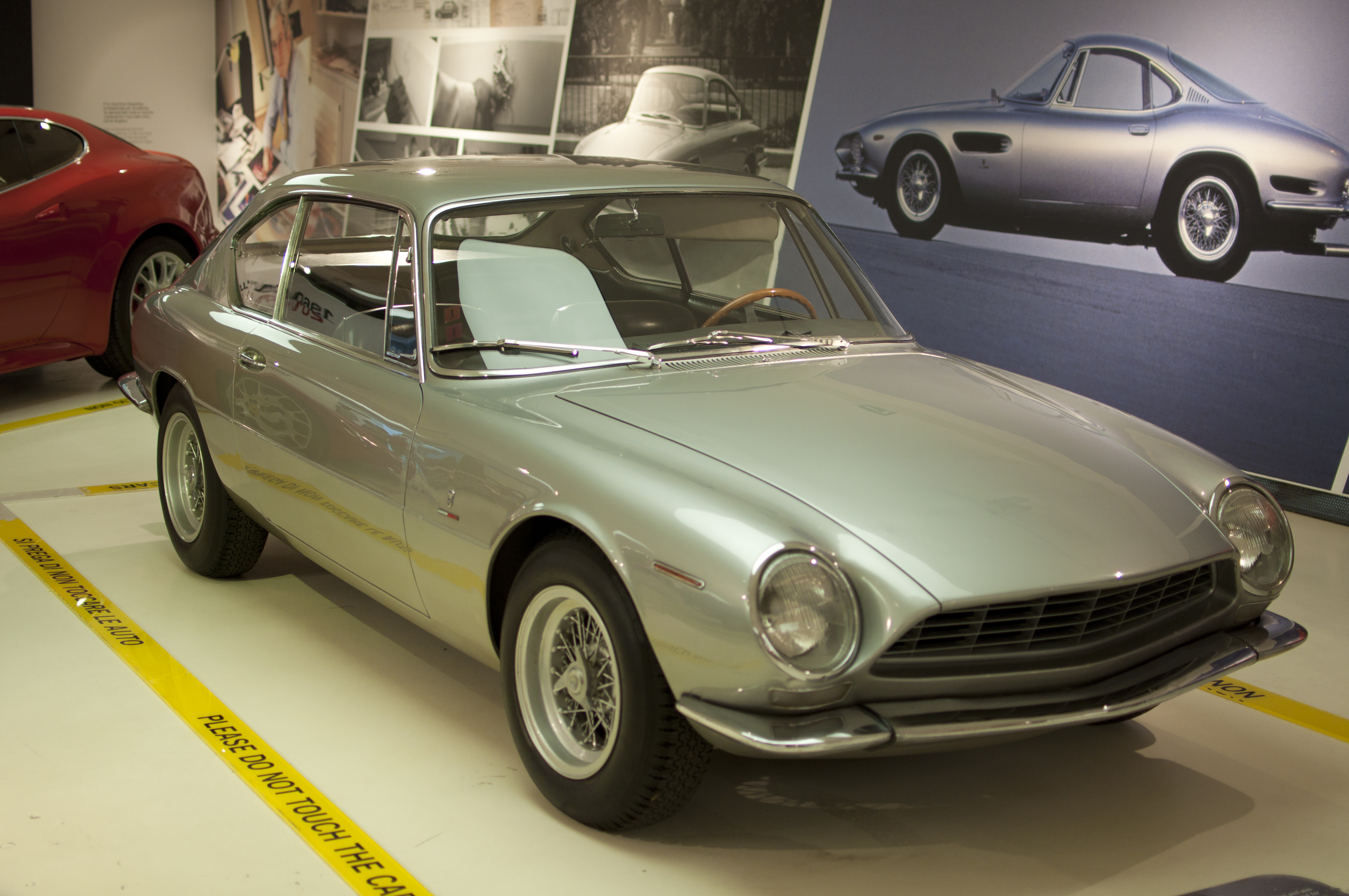
- Innocenti 186 GT on display at the Museo Ferrari

Overview
- Manufacturer: Innocenti
- Production: 1964 (2 made)
- Designer: Giorgetto Giugiaro at Bertone

Body and chassis
- Class: Sports car
- Body style: 2-door coupé
- Layout: Front-engine, rear-wheel-drive

Powertrain
- Engine: 1.8 L Ferrari V6
- Transmission: 4-speed manual with overdrive

Dimensions
- Wheelbase: 2,320 mm (91.3 in)
- Length: 4,200 mm (165.4 in)
- Width: 1,600 mm (63.0 in)
- Height: 1,250 mm (49.2 in)

The Innocenti 186 GT is a sports car jointly developed by Italian car manufacturers Innocenti and Ferrari in 1963–64, but never put into production. Just two prototypes were ever built, and one survives today.

== History ==
In 1960, Innocenti — whose main products were machinery and the successful Lambretta motor scooter—had entered the car industry, beginning assembly of British Motor Corporation models in its Lambrate factory. Founder Ferdinando Innocenti desired to expand his automotive operations introducing a small grand tourer, and related his idea to Enzo Ferrari. In 1963 this materialised in form of an agreement between the two car manufacturers: Ferrari would design a coupé with a V6 engine—fundamentally half of a Ferrari V12. (Note: Ferrari was not new to operations of this sort: at the same time in Lambrate, not far from the Innocenti factory, ASA was tooling up to produce the Ferrari-designed 1000 GT.) An engineering team was put together in Maranello, overseen by Innocenti's technical director Sandro Colombo assisted by Innocenti engineers, and composed by Ferrari personnel—including engine designer Franco Rocchi. (Note: Others were transmission engineer Walter Salvarani, chassis engineer Casoli and calculation engineer Marmiroli from Ferrari; engineers Arienti and Cattaneo from Innocenti.)

The 186 GT was powered by a 1,788 cc (109.1 cu in), 12-valve, single overhead cam 60° V6 (bore and stroke 77×64 mm), producing 156 PS (115 kW; 154 hp) at 7,000 rpm. The engine was mated to a British-derived 4-speed manual transmission with overdrive on third and fourth gear. The chassis was, in Ferrari tradition, a steel tube frame with separate body, using front double wishbone suspension, and a rear live axle on leaf springs with reaction arms. There were disc brakes on all four corners, and Borrani wire wheels fitted with 175×14" Pirelli Cinturato tyres.

A prototype chassis was rapidly built and delivered to the Turinese design house Bertone, which was tasked with design and eventually production of the bodyshell. There Giorgetto Giugiaro (then employed by Bertone) designed a 2+2 fastback coupé, and the first car was completed with part-aluminium coachwork. While the first example underwent some tests on Innocenti's Lambrate factory track, Colombo and the other Innocenti engineers involved in the project worked with Bertone on another, unibody version of the car. A unibody prototype was built, and was set to be the production version. Ultimately in 1964 the whole project was halted, when almost ready for series production. Sandro Colombo proposes two reasons for this decision. One is the Innocenti car sales network, too little developed and not adequate for the distribution of such an upscale vehicle—still depending as it was on many Lambretta motorcycle dealers. The other is the Italian recession of 1964–65, a less than ideal conjuncture to launch an expensive GT car aimed at affluent buyers. Of the two prototypes, one was destroyed, while the other remained in storage at an Innocenti facility. When the building was demolished in 1994 following Fiat's acquisition of Innocenti, the surviving 186 GT was rescued by Maserati historian Ermanno Cozza. In 2015 it was part of an exhibition at the Museo Ferrari in Maranello.
