= Lambretta Model A =

Late-1940s model of Italian motorcycle

- Manufacturer: Lambretta
- Production: 1947-1948
- Predecessor: None
- Successor: Lambretta Model B
- Class: Scooter
- Engine: 123 cc, two-stroke, single cylinder
- Bore / stroke: 52mm x 58mm
- Top speed: 44 mph (71 km/h)
- Power: 4.3 hp (3 kW; 4 PS)
- Transmission: 3-speed, Foot Operated
- Suspension: None (rear), two bushings (front)
- Brakes: Drum brakes
- Tyres: 3.50*7
- Dimensions: L: 1620mm W: 650mm H: 880mm
- Weight: 60kg (dry)
- Fuel consumption: 110 mpg_{‑imp} (2.6 L/100 km; 92 mpg_{‑US})

The Lambretta Model A is the first production model of Lambretta scooters. It was Ferdinando Innocenti's idea of a cheap type of transport for Italy in the mid-late 1940s.

== Overview ==
The Lambretta Model A was the first production scooter from Ferdinando Innocenti's Lambretta. It was designed because Ferdinando Innocenti realised the importance of cheap transport to rebuild Post-War Italy. The bike's design was radical for its time but was also easy to operate. The bike was produced from October 1947-October 1948 and sold 9,669 units.

== Design ==
The tubular frame was made of 2 sections; the front end was made of pressed steel connected to the steering and front forks. It came with a tool box, gear indicator, foot pedal gears and an oil measuring jug integrated into the petrol tank cap. The 123cc engine was shaft driven and direct air cooled. The Model A also came with a 3-Speed Gear Box, the front forks consisted of 2 bushes only and there was no rear suspension. It came with drum brakes and 7 inch chrome wheel rims.

== Sales and Production ==
The Lambretta Model A sold badly in the first 2 months only moving 47 units but production picked up and in the last 5 months they were producing over 1,000 units a month.

Month and Year	Production
October 1947	22
November 1947	25
December 1947	105
January 1948	143
February 1948	342
March 1948	658
April 1948	758
May 1948	890
June 1948	1198
July 1948	1205
August 1948	1100
September 1948	1750
October 1948	1473
Total	9,669
