= Lambretta Model D =

Scooter built by Lambretta

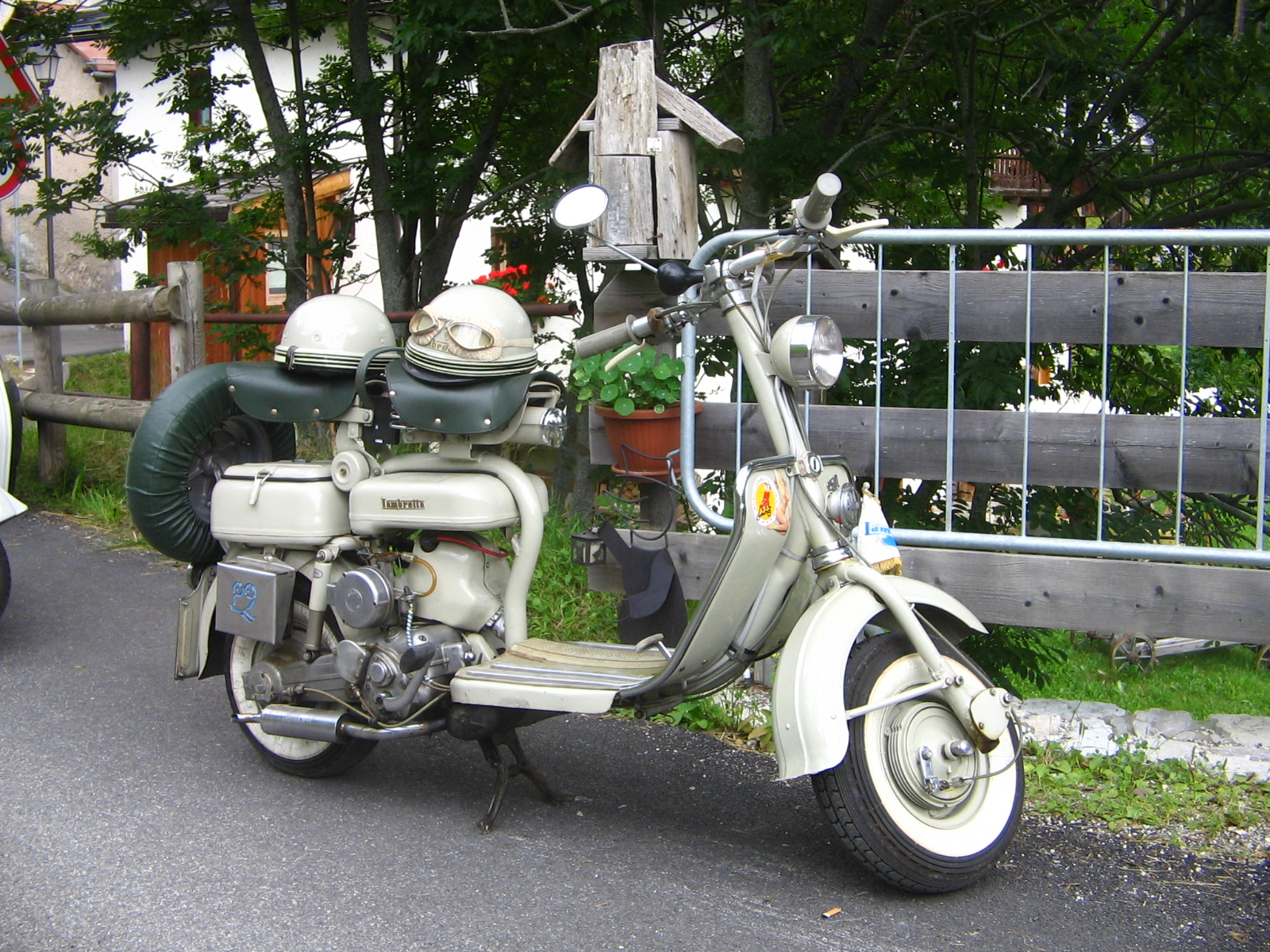
- Lambretta Model D 150
- Manufacturer: Lambretta
- Parent company: Innocenti
- Production: 125D: 1951-1956; 150D: 1954-1956
- Predecessor: Model C
- Successor: Model E
- Class: Scooter
- Engine: 125D: 123 cc (7.5 cu in) direct air-cooled, two-stroke single-cylinder; 150D: 148 cc (9.0 cu in) direct air-cooled, two-stroke single-cylinder
- Bore / stroke: 125D: 52 mm × 58 mm (2.0 in × 2.3 in); 150D: 57 mm × 58 mm (2.2 in × 2.3 in)
- Compression ratio: 1:6.5
- Top speed: 125D: 47 mph (76 km/h) @ 4,600rpm; 150D: 55 mph (89 km/h) @ 4,800rpm
- Power: 125D: 5 hp (3.7 kW); 150D: 6 hp (4.5 kW)
- Ignition type: Points Ignition System
- Transmission: 3-speed handlebar twistgrip, Shaft drive
- Frame type: Steel Tubular Frame
- Suspension: Front: Spring Suspension; Rear: Torsion Bar
- Brakes: Front: Finned aluminium drum brakes; Rear: Finned aluminium drum brakes
- Tyres: 4.00*8
- Dimensions: L: 1,770 millimetres (70 in); W: 740 millimetres (29 in); H: 960 millimetres (38 in)
- Weight: 125D: 70 kilograms (150 lb); 150D: 75 kilograms (165 lb); (dry)
- Fuel capacity: 5.6 + 0.7 L (1.23 + 0.15 imp gal; 1.48 + 0.18 US gal)
- Fuel consumption: 141 mpg_{‑imp} (2.00 L/100 km; 117 mpg_{‑US})

The Lambretta Model D was a scooter produced by Lambretta as a direct replacement for the Model C. The Model D was the first Innocenti scooter to be manufactured outside of Italy as the licence was sold in Europe, Asia and South America.

== Model D Design ==
=== Frame and Body ===
The Model D had a revised steel tubular frame that had been lengthened to make way for new suspension and other small updates. The basic layout of the Model C was kept with a fuel tank under the front seat and a toolbox at the rear of the bike. The front suspension tubes were fully enclosed to hide the spring suspension and hermetically sealed in oil to protect from corrosion. Rear suspension was provided by torsion bar that attached to the engine and frame with the engine pivoted at the front and being used as a swing arm. Early engine mounts (1951 to mid-1952) were just bearings, in mid-1952 they were changed to Silent Blocs to help reduce vibration. A headlamp was attached to the front of the frame with underneath the bicycle styled chrome steel handlebars. A round brake light was attached at the rear of the bike just above the number plate. Brakes were provided by aluminium finned drums with the front being cable operated and the rear rod operated, by a pedal located on the right floor panel. The tyres were 4.00* 8 came out of the factory provided by Italian manufactures Pirelli or CEAT.

Later versions included adjustable aluminium handlebars, plastic levers, lock for toolbox lid, ivory and later white plastic light switch, provisions for a rear damper to be fitted and grab handles on the rear saddle.

=== Engine and transmission ===
The 123cc engine and transmission was upgraded and simplified in an attempt to improve reliability as well as improving the ride of the scooter. The top end kept the same construction with the cylinder made of cast iron and head aluminium but the cooling system was enlarged to make the bike more reliable in heat and under strain. The new Carburetor was a Dell'Orto MA18. The transmission provided by a 3-speed gearbox and was shaft driven. The exhaust was revised to reduce noise and vibration. In 1954 due to demand from the public, for a larger engine, the Model D150 was announced with a 148cc engine. The overall top speed was improved slightly but the main area of improvement was in torque and gear ratios to make the ride smoother and to help the scooter make it up mountain passes.

=== Electrics ===
The electrics on a Model D were, basic the ignition being provided by contact points and the lights and horn were provided by 6 volt electrics. Later models could have an electric start fitted as an extra, controlled by a small plastic lever on the handlebars.

=== Paint and finish ===
The 125D came in 3 Lechler system body colours Olive green 8021, Light chamois 8055 and Sand beige 8029. Engine and frame were painted in Aluminium Fiat 690. Early saddles were brown imitation leather but in 1954 the colour was changed to green. The 150D came only came in 2 colours Sand beige 8029 and a few examples from 1956 came in Light grey 8012. Engine and frame were once again painted in Aluminium Fiat 690.

== LD Design ==
Lambretta Model LD
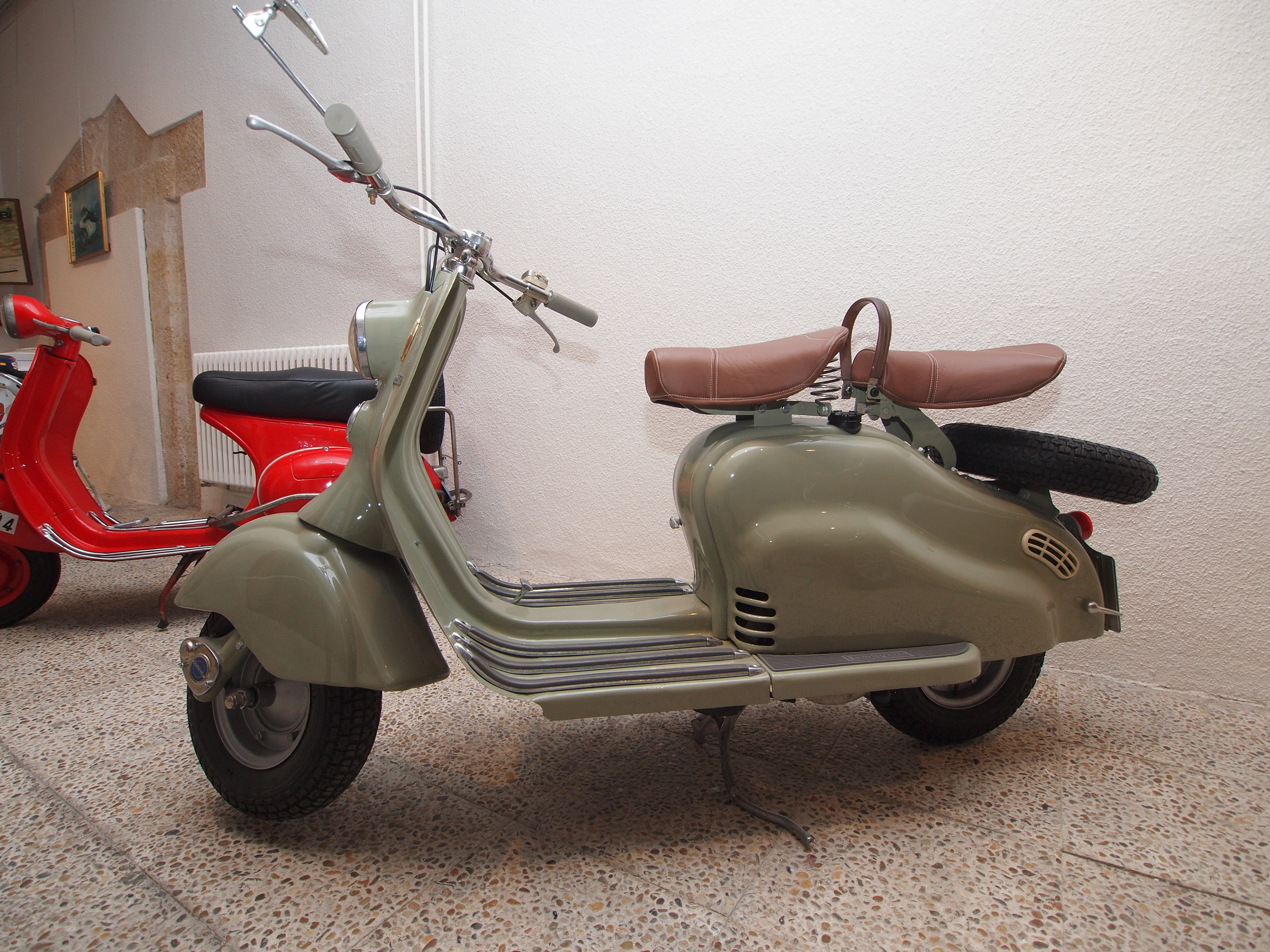
- Lambretta Model LD 125
- Manufacturer: Lambretta
- Parent company: Innocenti
- Production: 125LD: 1951-1958; 150LD: 1954-1958
- Predecessor: Model C
- Successor: Li Series 1
- Class: Scooter
- Engine: 125LD: 123 cc (7.5 cu in) direct air-cooled, two-stroke single-cylinder; 150LD: 148 cc (9.0 cu in) direct air-cooled, two-stroke single-cylinder
- Bore / stroke: 125LD: 52 mm × 58 mm (2.0 in × 2.3 in); 150LD: 57 mm × 58 mm (2.2 in × 2.3 in)
- Compression ratio: 1:6.5
- Top speed: 125lD: 47 mph (76 km/h) @ 4,600rpm; 150lD: 55 mph (89 km/h) @ 4,800rpm
- Power: 125LD: 5 hp (3.7 kW); 150LD: 6 hp (4.5 kW)
- Ignition type: Points Ignition System
- Transmission: 3-speed handlebar twistgrip, Shaft drive
- Frame type: Steel Tubular Frame
- Suspension: Front: Spring Suspension; Rear: Torsion Bar
- Brakes: Front: Finned aluminium drum brakes; Rear: Finned aluminium drum brakes
- Tyres: 4.00*8
- Dimensions: L: 1,770 millimetres (70 in); W: 740 millimetres (29 in); H: 960 millimetres (38 in)
- Weight: 125LD: 85 kilograms (187 lb); 150LD: 88 kilograms (194 lb); (dry)
- Fuel capacity: 5.6 + 0.7 L (1.23 + 0.15 imp gal; 1.48 + 0.18 US gal)
- Fuel consumption: 141 mpg_{‑imp} (2.00 L/100 km; 117 mpg_{‑US})

The Lambretta LD was launched as a direct replacement for the LC luxury models of Lambretta and was essentially a Model D with Leg Shields, running boards and side panels to provide improved protection from weather and the dirty components of the scooter.

=== Frame and Body ===
The LD was almost exactly the same as the Model D in frame and engine. The body leg-shields, horncast, running boards and side panels. Side panels had 2 chrome ring portholes near the rear of the bike. The extra panels added 15 kg (33 lbs) to the overall dry weight of the LD125. Other than a few differences, such as an Innocenti badge located on the headlight and Lambretta badge in aluminium on the leg-shield, the 125D and 125LD were identical. Later versions included oval panel hole, replacing the 2 portholes, with plastic vent grills, plastic badge on the leg-shields larger saddles with dark green leather covers and a larger air-filter.

=== Engine and transmission ===
The engine remained the same as that found in the Model D.

=== Paint ===
Paint was also the same as the Model D, but in 1953 the LD125 only came in Sand beige 8029.
