= Lambretta Model C =

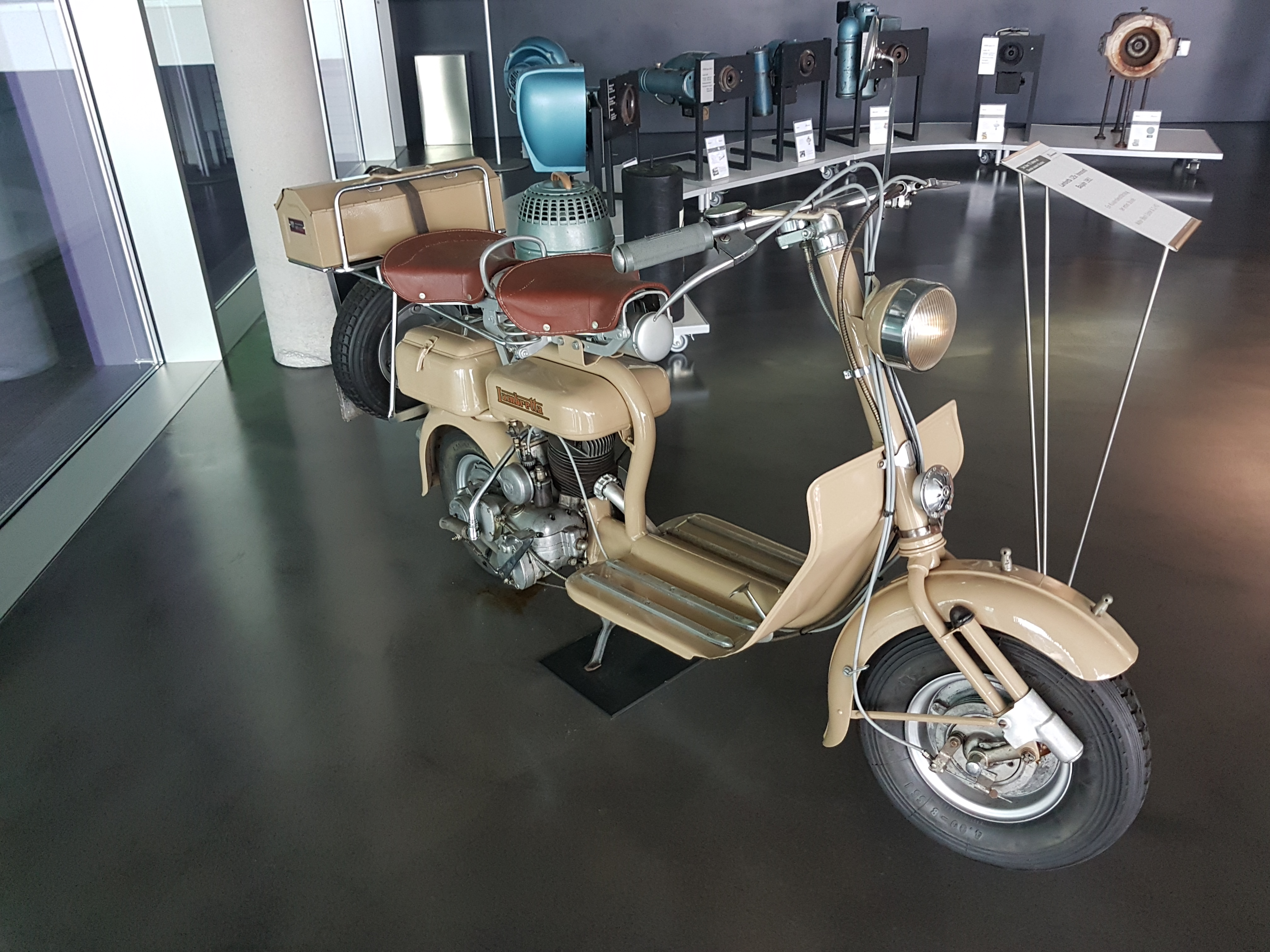
- Manufacturer: Lambretta
- Production: 1950–1951
- Predecessor: Lambretta Model B
- Successor: Lambretta Model D
- Class: Scooter
- Engine: 123 cc, two stroke, single cylinder
- Bore / stroke: 52 mm × 58 mm
- Top speed: 44 mph (71 km/h)
- Power: 4.3 hp (3 kW; 4 PS)
- Transmission: 3-speed, handlebar twist grip
- Suspension: Spring suspension (front & rear)
- Brakes: Drum
- Tyres: 4.00 × 8
- Dimensions: L: 1730 mm W: 730 mm H: 920 mm
- Weight: Model C 70kg; Model LC 80kg; (dry)
- Fuel consumption: Model C110 mpg_{‑imp} (2.6 L/100 km; 92 mpg_{‑US}); Model LC141 mpg_{‑imp} (2.00 L/100 km; 117 mpg_{‑US})

The Lambretta Model C was the third production Scooter made by Innocenti's Lambretta. The Model C was the first Lambretta scooter to be imported the United Kingdom. The C is seen as a more reliable bike than previous models although it remained very similar to its predecessors.

== Design ==
Starting with the Model C Lambretta frames would be made of tube. The engine was once again a 123cc air-cooled engine but the block was this time was integrated to the frame with the spring suspension. The same carburetor, a Dell'Orto MA16, was used on the Model C as on the previous bikes. A 3 speed gearbox was also used as with the other models but the frame was made of a single piece of tube. The Model C had drum brakes, Front and Rear, and the head light was mounted on the front of the frame below the handlebars and the rear light was smaller and placed above the number plate. The Model C came with many more options than previous versions including rear seat, bolt on leg shields, a horn cover, speedometer, floor mats and a spare wheel. It came in 4 different colours, Beige, Green, Grey and Red.

== Sales and production ==
Lambretta made 87,500 Model C's and 42,500 Model LC's, this is much higher than previous models.

== Model LC ==
The Model LC was a Model C with full leg shields, side panels and rear running boards, the first Lambretta to do so, the 'L' stands for Lusso, meaning luxury in English. The side panel featured an access panel so the rider could turn on the choke without removing the side panel. Due to the side panels direct engine cooling could not work, so the flywheel gained cooling fins.
