= Yamaha XJ650 Maxim =

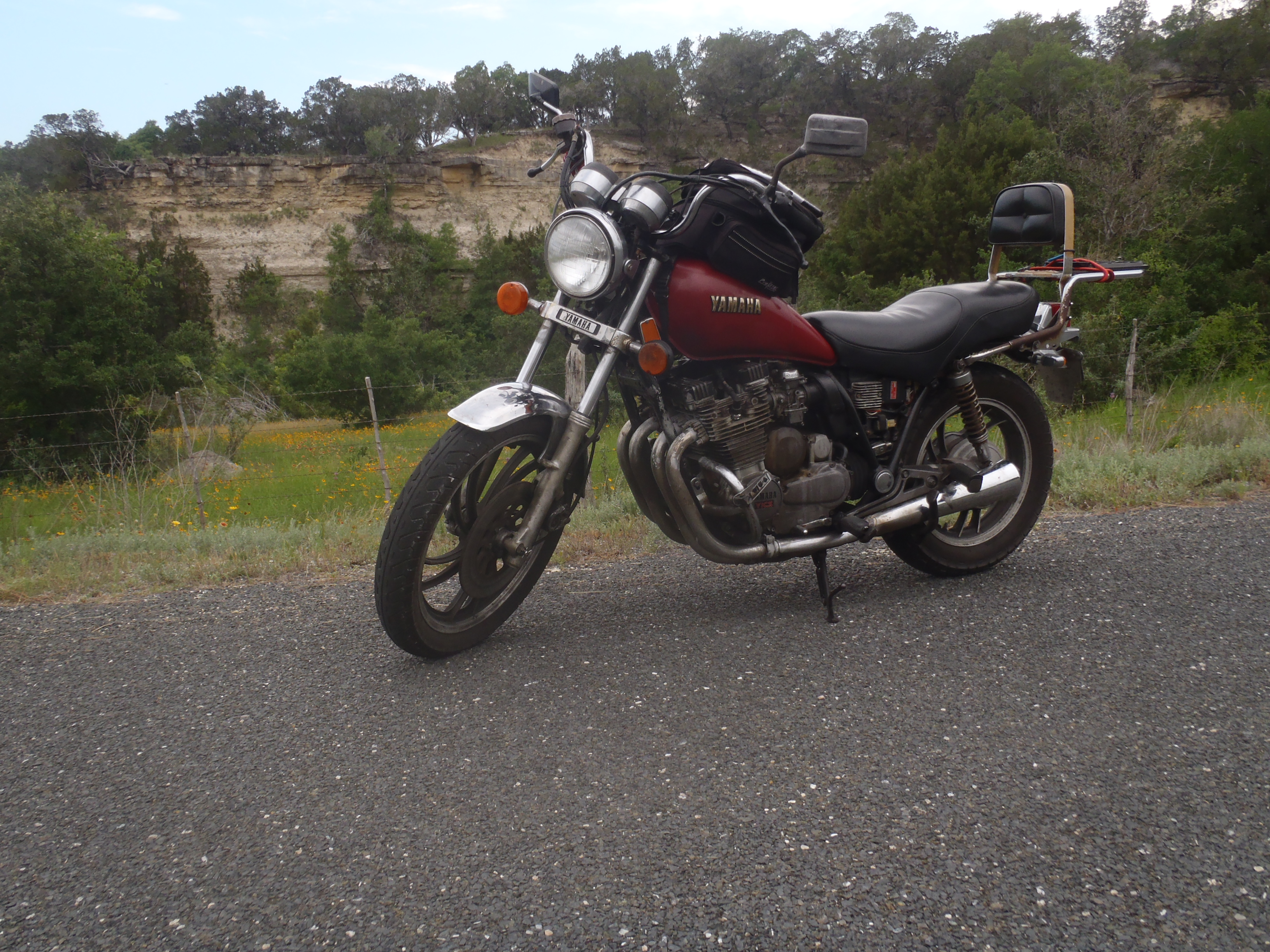
- 1982 Yamaha XJ650RJ Seca
- Manufacturer: Yamaha
- Also called: Maxim 650
- Parent company: Yamaha Corporation
- Production: 1980–1983
- Predecessor: Yamaha XS 650 Special
- Class: Sport/Cruiser
- Engine: 653 cc air-cooled four-stroke inline-4, DOHC, 2 valves per cylinder
- Bore / stroke: 63 х 52.4 mm
- Compression ratio: 9.2:1
- Top speed: 122 mph (196 km/h)
- Power: 73 hp (54 kW) @ 9000 rpm (claimed)
- Torque: 42 lb⋅ft (57 N⋅m) @ 7200 rpm (claimed)
- Ignition type: transistorized
- Transmission: 5-speed
- Frame type: tubular steel
- Suspension: Front: 36 mm Air assisted telescopic forks, 147 mm wheel travel Rear:5-way adjustable spring preload, 97 mm wheel travel
- Brakes: Front: Single 300 mm disc Rear: drum
- Tires: Front: 3.25-H19; Rear:130/90-H16
- Seat height: 29.3 inches
- Fuel capacity: 13 liters/3.4 gal
- Related: Yamaha XJ750 Maxim

The Yamaha XJ650 Maxim is a mid-size motorcycle by the Yamaha Motor Company, introduced in 1980 as the Maxim I and produced through 1983. The successor of the XS Special introduced in 1978, the XJ650 was an early entry in the mass market cruiser segment, and given a newly designed transverse DOHC inline-four engine and a swingarm-mounted shaft drive.

== History ==
=== Overview ===
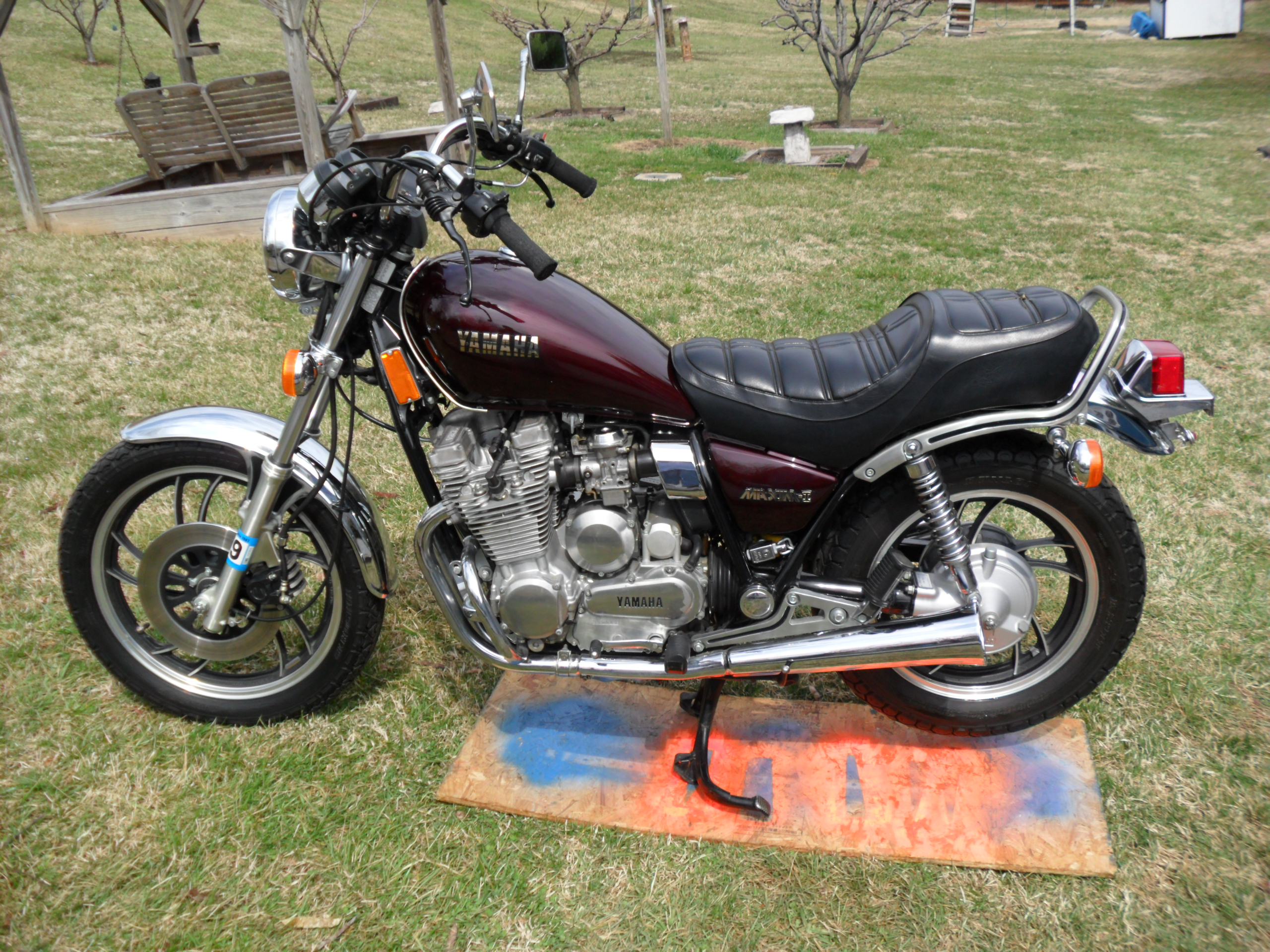
1980 Yamaha XJ650 Maxim I

The 4 cylinder, air-cooled, twin-cam 650cc engine is housed in a cross-braced duplex steel tube frame. Yamaha made the engine narrower by locating the alternator behind the cylinder block and above the gearbox rather than on the end of the crankshaft. The Maxim had shaft drive. Contemporary reports praised the Maxim's performance and braking. Criticism was aimed at engine vibration and under-damped suspension. Succeeding Maxim models were refinements; the 1982 Maxim 650 had a more comfortable handlebar, an air-adjustable fork, and a more luxurious seat. A turbocharged variant, the XJ650 Seca Turbo, was featured in the 1983 James Bond film Never Say Never Again.

Cycle magazine said in 1982 "Three years later, after the wide proliferation of special styling, it's easy to forget what a landmark bike the Maxim was...The 650 was striking, controversial, sensational, and wildly successful in showrooms. Other companies have produced bodacious knock-offs of the 650 Maxim, imitations that suffer from excess. It's too bad the Maxim was obscured when manufacturers blanketed the market with cruisers. A decade down the road, the Maxim may well be a genuine classic of the 1980s — a bright idea that stood the test of time."

=== Engine/Drivetrain ===
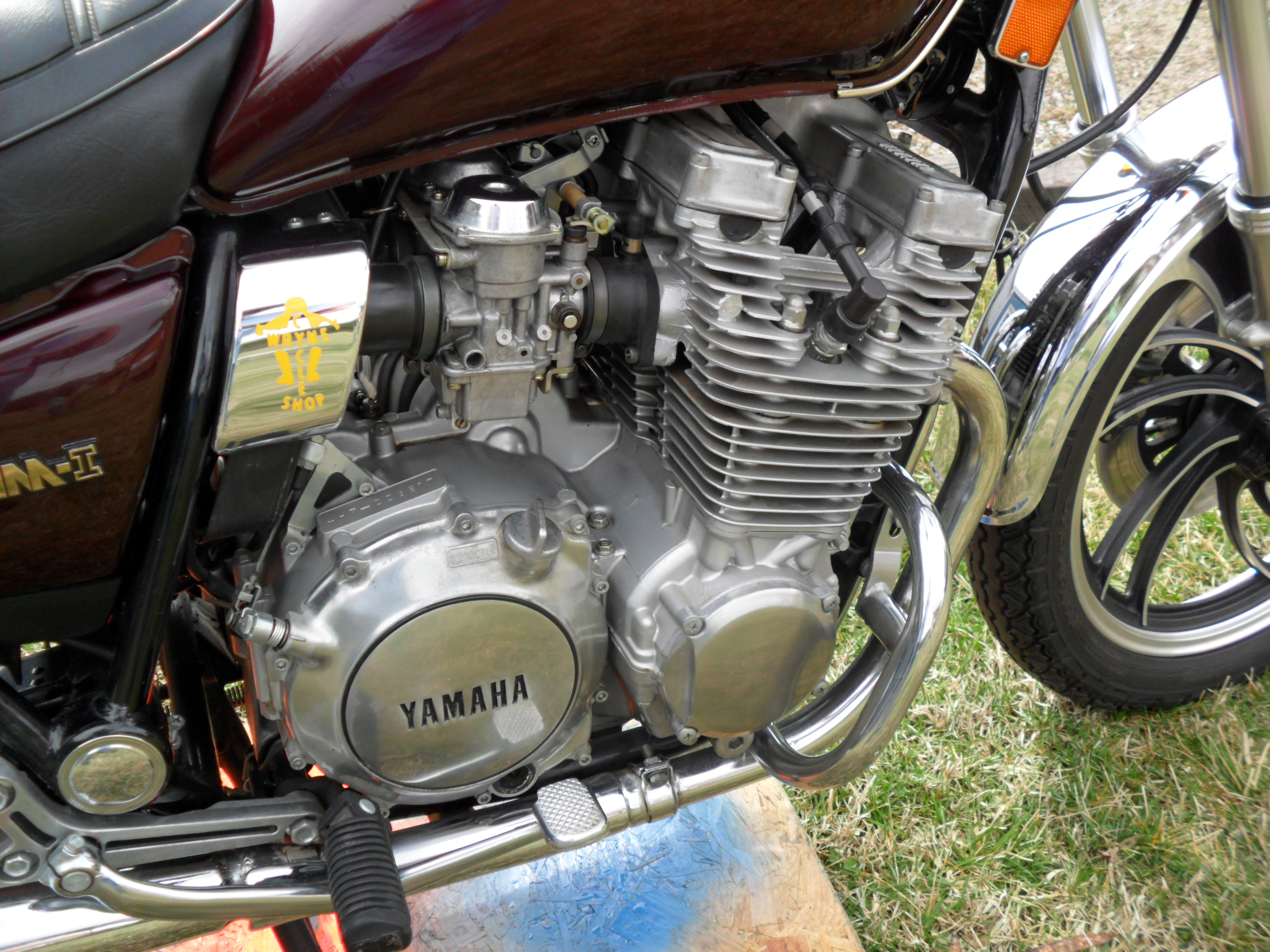
Yamaha 653 cc DOHC inline-4

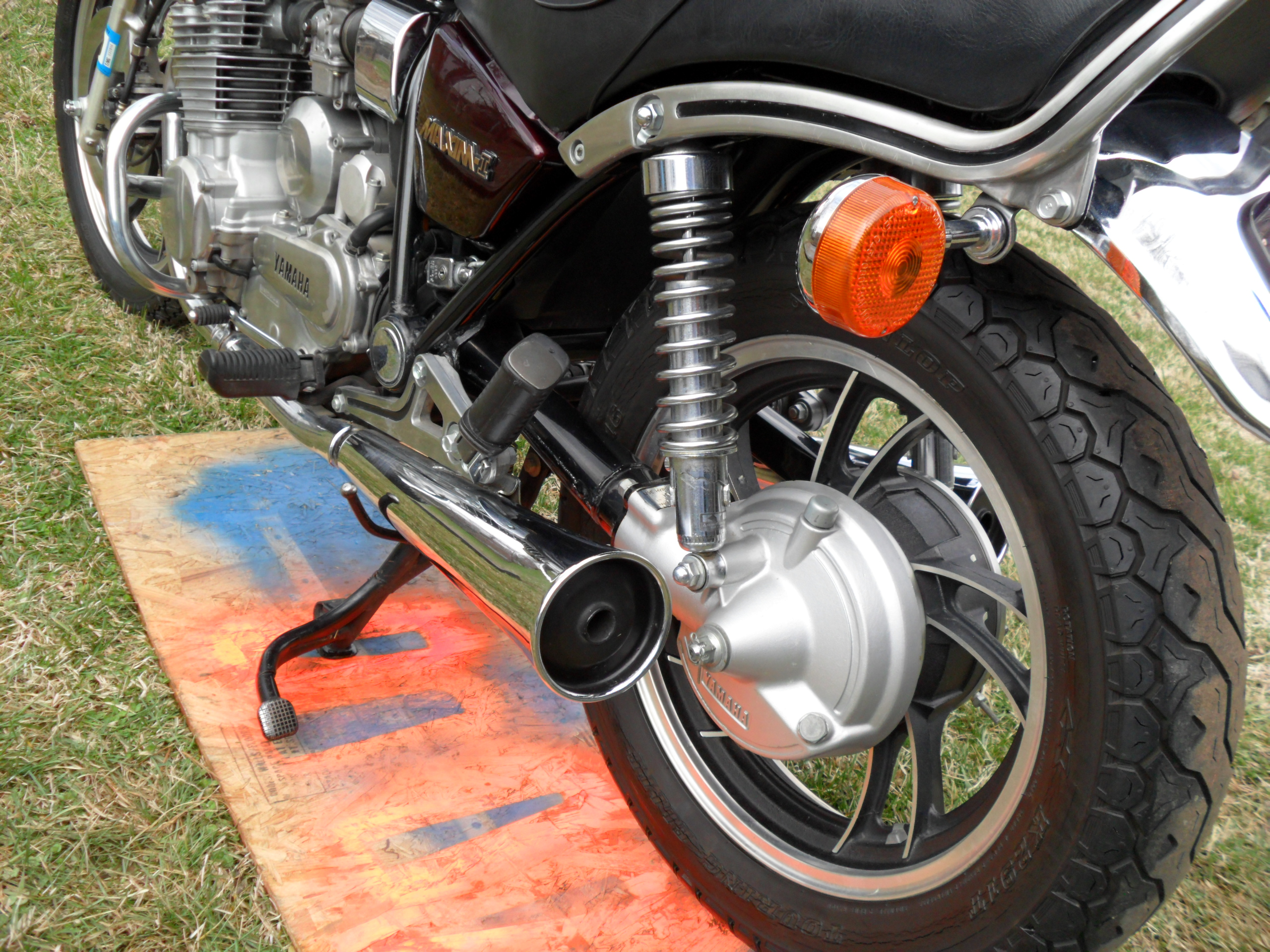
Yamaha shaft drive

The 1980 to 1983 XJ650 Maxim combined an air-cooled, 653 cc DOHC two valve per cylinder transverse inline-four engine and a swingarm-mounted shaft drive. The alternator and starter were placed behind the engine to minimize width.

The engine's crankshaft was one-piece, with plain bearings, the camshafts were chain-driven and used bucket-and-shim adjustment. A second chain drove the crankcase-mounted oil pump, and a (Hy-Vo) third drove the alternator. Four Hitachi constant velocity carburetors provided fuel mix, detonated by electronic ignition. Four-into-two headers sent the exhaust through two shortened mufflers.

== See also ==
- List of Yamaha motorcycles
