= Swingarm =

Joins the rear wheel of a motorcycle to its body

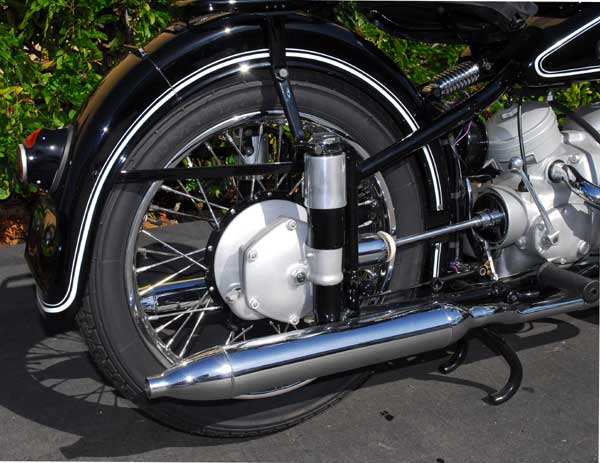
Plunger suspension on a 1953 BMW R51/3

A swingarm, originally known as a swing fork or pivoted fork, is a single or double sided mechanical device which attaches the rear wheel of a motorcycle to its body, allowing it to pivot vertically. The main component of the rear suspension of most modern motorbikes and ATVs, it holds the rear axle firmly, while pivoting to absorb bumps and suspension loads induced by the rider, acceleration, and braking.

Originally motorcycles had no rear suspension, as their frames were little more than stronger versions of the classic diamond frame of a bicycle. Many types of suspension were tried, including Indian's leaf spring suspended swingarm, and Matchless's cantilevered coiled-spring swingarm. Immediately before and after World War II, the plunger suspension, in which the axle moved up and down two vertical posts, became commonplace. In the latter, the movement in each direction was against coiled springs.

Some manufacturers, such as Greeves, used swingarm designs for the front forks, which were more robust than telescopic forks. In particular, sidecar motocross outfits frequently use swingarm front forks. The swingarm has also been used for the front suspension of scooters. In this case it aids in simplifying maintenance. In motorcycles with shaft drive, such as the Yamaha XJ650 Maxim, the shaft housing forms the left side swingarm.

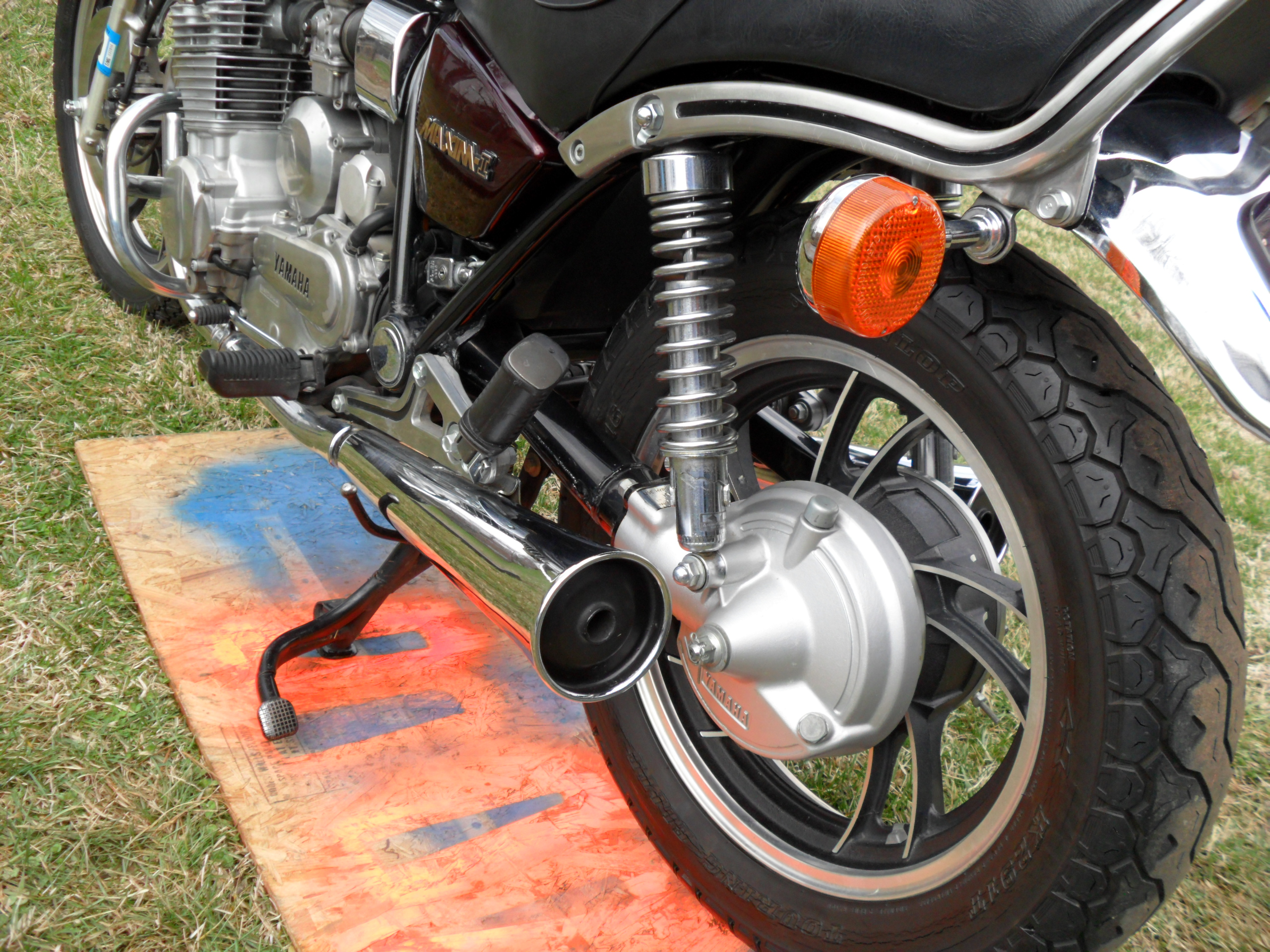
Yamaha XJ650 Maxim has a driveshaft forming the left swingarm

== Swingarm types ==
Swingarms may be single or double sided, and appear in a variety of geometries. Many single-sided also incorporate the driveshaft.

Swinging fork - the original version, consisting of a pair of parallel pipes holding the rear axle at one end and pivoting at the other. A pair of shock absorbers are mounted just before the rear axle and attached to the frame, below the seat rail.

Cantilever - An extension of the swinging fork where a triangulated frame transfers swingarm movement to compress one or more shock absorbers, generally mounted in front of the swingarm. The HRD-Vincent Motorcycle is a famous early form of this type of swingarm, though Matchless used it earlier, and Yamaha subsequently. The Harley-Davidson Softail is another form of this swingarm, though working in reverse, with the shock absorbers being extended rather than compressed.

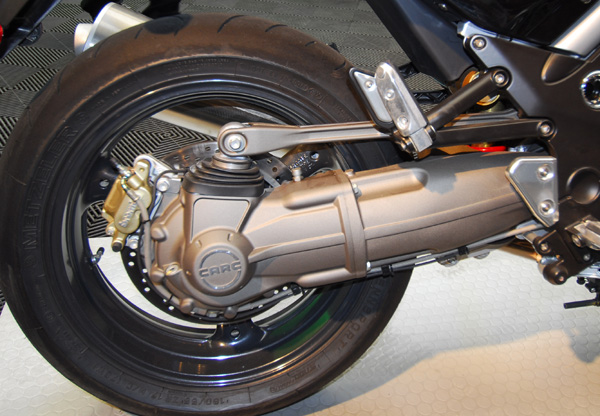
Moto Guzzi's CRDS variant of the parallelogram

Parallelogram - Was first introduced commercially in 1985 on the Magni "Le Mans". Magni called the system Parallelogrammo. Various parallelogram systems have been developed by other manufacturers.

Whereas downward generated mechanical forces would cause a chain-driven bike to "squat" at the rear under acceleration, the torque reaction of a shaft drive machine would induce the opposite, causing the seat (and rider) to rise upwards, a phenomenon known as "shaft-jacking". This anti-intuitive sensation can be disconcerting to riders, which parallelogram suspensions seek to neutralize.

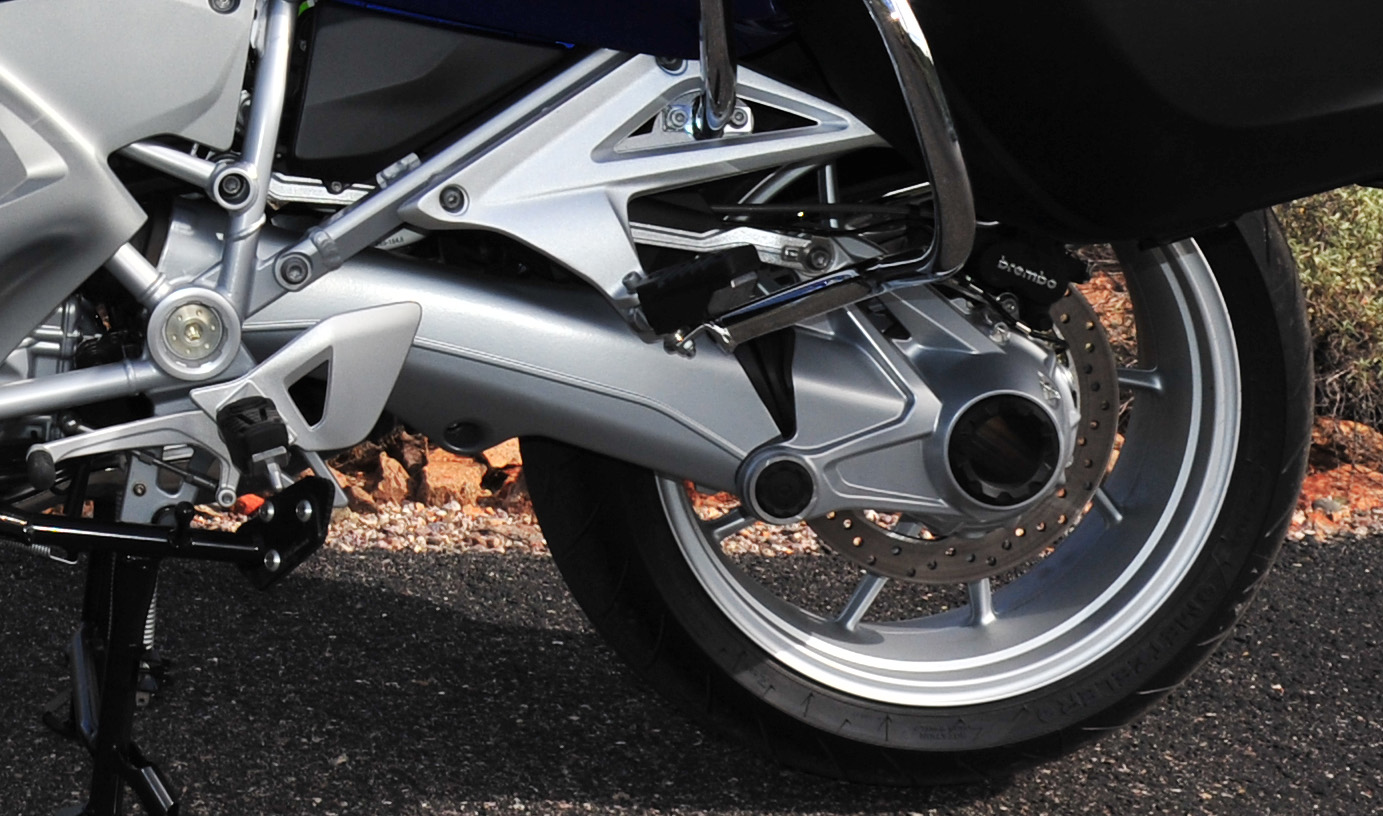
BMW's Paralever rear suspension on a 2015 R1200RT

BMW introduced its Paralever system on its 1988 R80GS and R100GS motorcycles, which adds a second link between the rear drive and transmission to allow the driveshaft to pivot along the same axis as the sprung rear frame.

Moto Guzzi patented its Compact Reactive Drive Shaft system (Ca.R.C.), where the driveshaft is free to float into its structure, providing much softer feedback from transmission. An upper arm serves as a guide to close the geometry of the suspension.

Extended swingarms - are often used by drag racing motorcycles (called dragbikes) to keep their center of gravity as forward as possible, which reduces the tendency to wheelie at the start.

Single-sided swingarm - a suspension lying along only one side of the rear wheel, allowing it to be mounted to a hub like a car wheel. Also found on scooters, where a robust chain case doubles as the swingarm linking the engine and rear wheel, single-sided swingarms need to be much stiffer and more heavily built than double-sided, to accommodate the extra torsional forces. Having a single mounting point guarantees proper wheel alignment.

Single-sided swingarms date from at least the late 1940s. In 1948, the Imme R100 produced by Norbert Riedel of Germany had both a single-sided front wheel suspension as well as a single-sided rear swingarm that doubled as the exhaust pipe. In 1950 Moto Guzzi introduced the Galletto, a large-wheel step-through scooter. In 1980, BMW introduced its first single-sided swingarm on the R80G/S, the "Mono-lever", which was superseded by the "Para-lever" used currently. Honda featured this style of swingarm on the VFR series of sport bikes produced from 1982 through 2021. Ducati has created several models featuring single swingarms, most notably the Massimo Tamburini-designed 916 series. While Ducati abandoned this style for the 999, the company returned to it for the 1098 superbike in 2007, and it survives in the current Ducati 1199. The Triumph Sprint ST and Speed Triple also feature single-sided swingarms.

=== Images ===
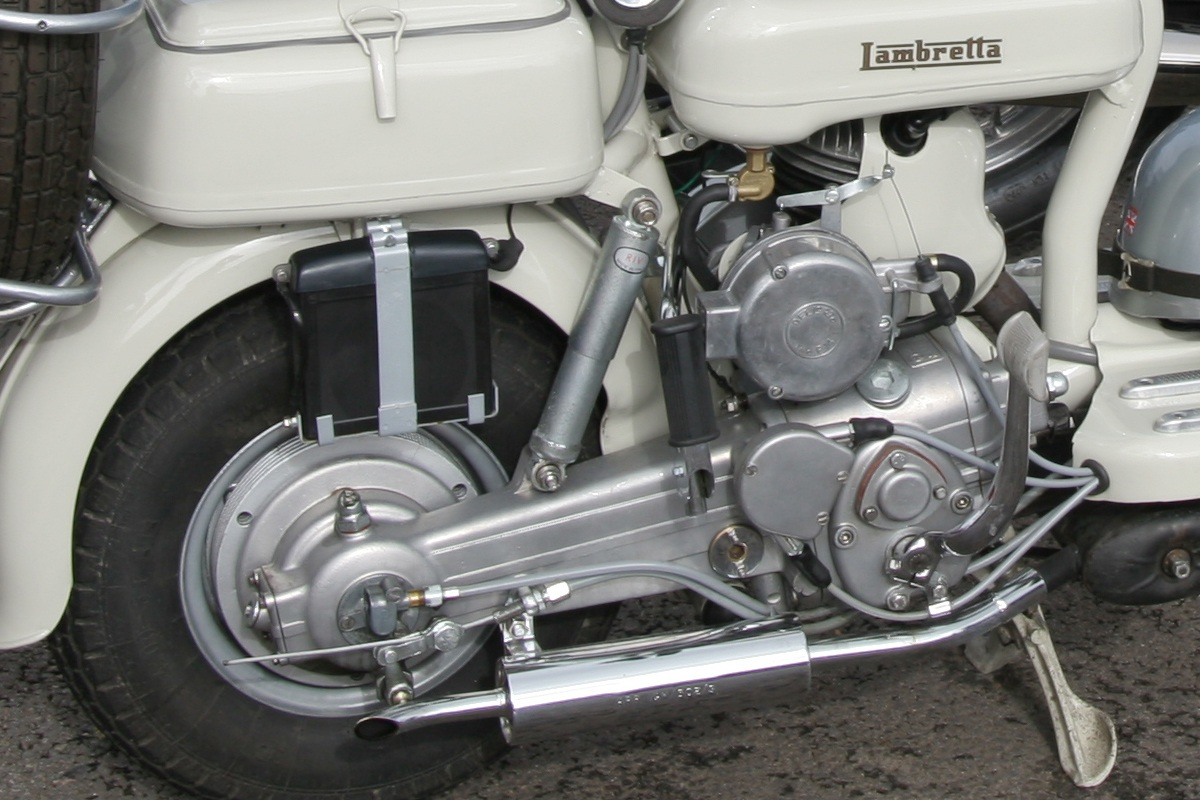
Right side Of a Lambretta Model C, showing swingarm and suspension.

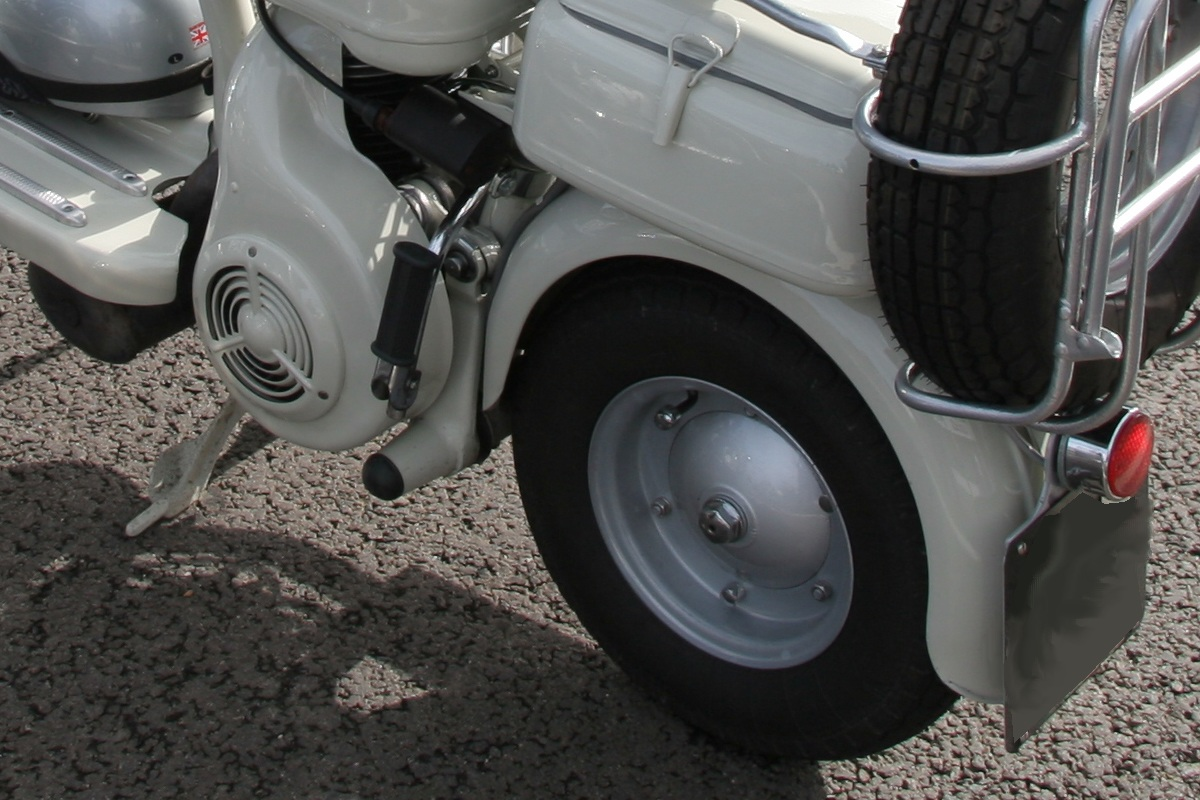
Left side, showing rear wheel with no visible suspension.

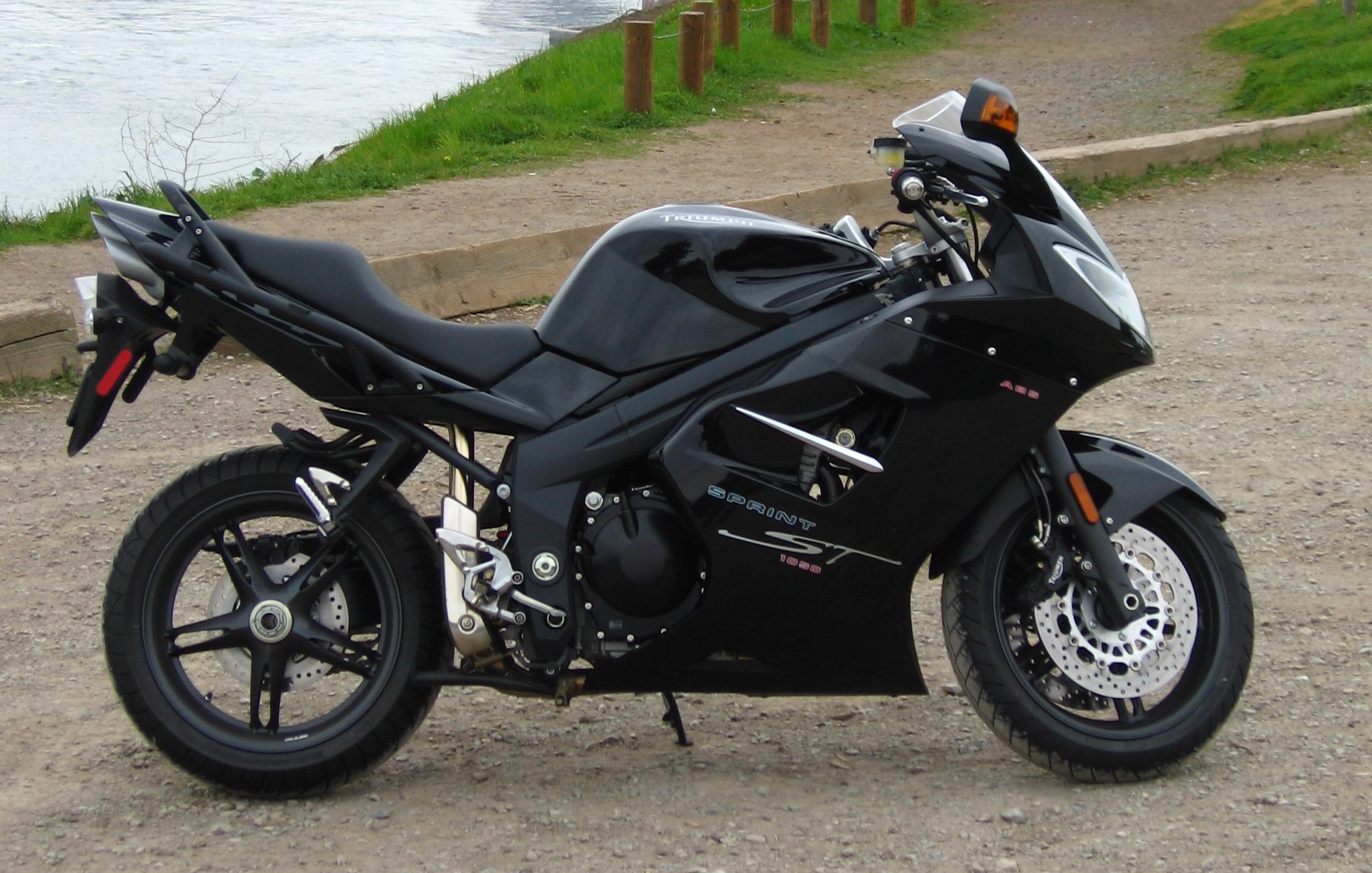
Triumph Sprint ST with single-sided swingarm.

== Squat and shaft-jacking ==
"Squat" occurs when the top of the final drive chain run pulls the swingarm upwards, lowering the rider position and the bike's center of gravity; "shaft-jacking" is the opposite, where the shaft drive bevel gear tries to "climb up" the large bevel gear in the wheel hub, pushing the swingarm downwards and away from the frame while raising the rider and center of gravity.

Shaft-jacking can be minimised by devices such as parallelogram swingarms. A practical way to minimise squat on a chain-drive bike is to locate the final drive sprocket as close as possible to the axis of the swingarm pivot; the ideal solution is to make the final drive sprocket and the swingarm pivot concentric, as was done on the Hesketh V1000.

== See also ==
- Bicycle suspension
