= Innocenti =

Italian vehicle maker

- Industry: Automotive
- Founded: 1933
- Founder: Ferdinando Innocenti
- Defunct: 1997; 29 years ago
- Fate: Scooter sector (independent company) in 1971, car production 1993, using marque 1997
- Headquarters: Milan, Italy
- Key people: Ferdinando Innocenti, founder
- Products: Scooters, automobiles
- Parent: British Leyland (1972–1976); De Tomaso (1976–1990); Fiat (1990–1997)

Innocenti (Italian pronunciation: [innoˈtʃɛnti]) was an Italian machinery works, originally established by Ferdinando Innocenti in 1933 in Lambrate, a neighborhood on the eastern outskirts of Milan. Over the years, they produced Lambretta scooters as well as a range of automobiles, mainly of British Leyland origins. The brand was retired in 1996, six years after being acquired by Fiat.

== History ==
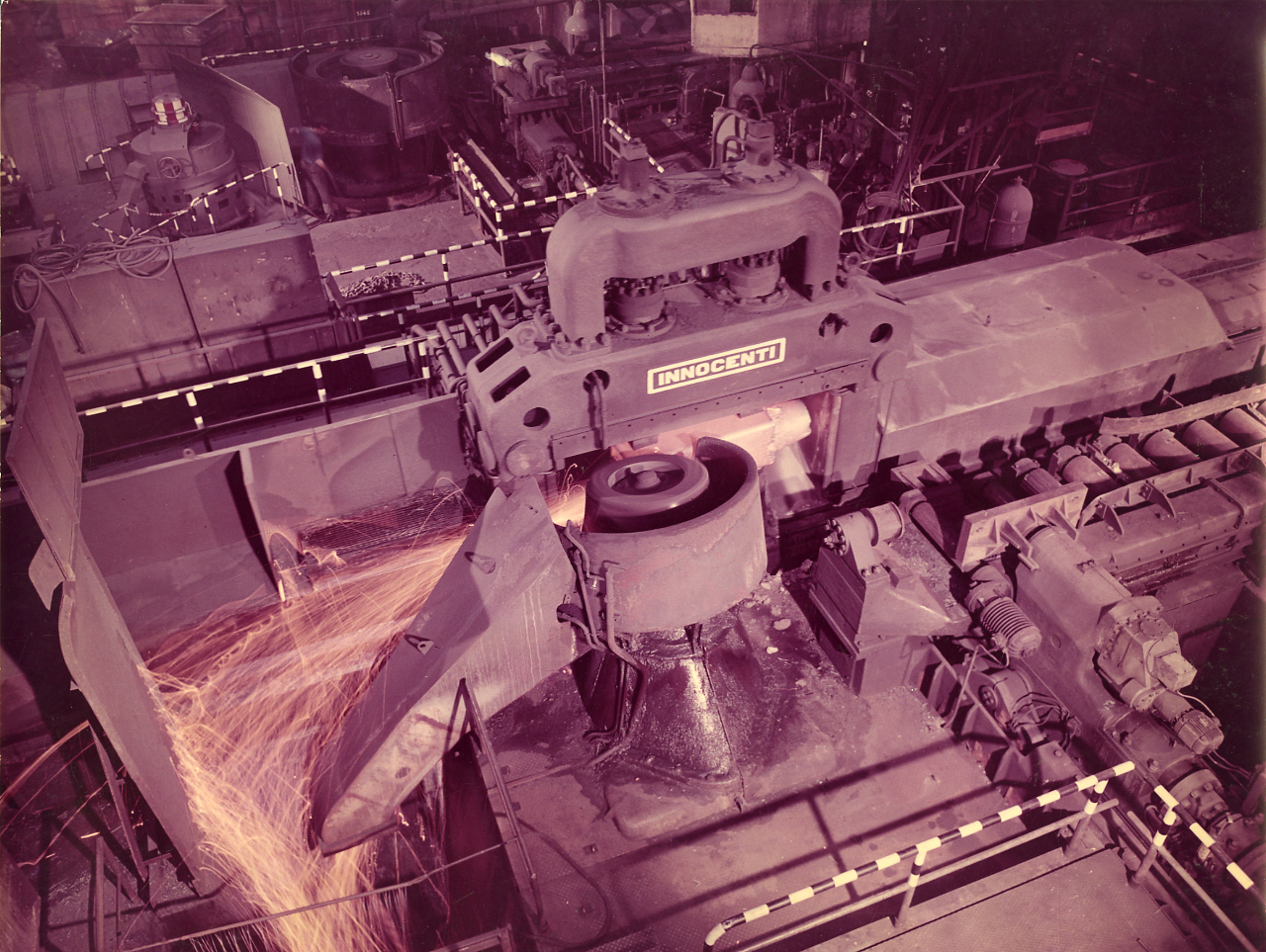
Innocenti machinery, photo by Paolo Monti, 1960

After World War II, the company was famous for many years for Lambretta scooters models such as the Lambretta 48, LI125, LI150, TV175, TV200, SX125, SX150, SX200, GP125, GP150 and GP200.

From 1961 to 1976, Innocenti built under licence the BMC (later the British Leyland Motor Corporation / BLMC) Mini, with 848, 998 cc and 1,275 cc engines, followed by other models, including, from 1973, the Regent (Allegro), with engines up to 1,485 cc. The company of this era is commonly called Leyland Innocenti. The Innocenti Spyder (1961–70) was a re-bodied version of the Austin-Healey MKII Sprite (styling by Ghia). The car was produced by OSI, near Milan. In 1972, BLMC took over control of the company.

In 1972, the company's land, buildings and equipment were purchased by British Leyland in a deal involving approximately £3 million. The British company had high hopes for its newly acquired subsidiary at a time when, they reported to the UK press, Italian Innocenti sales were second only to those of Fiat and ahead of Volkswagen and Renault: there was talk of further increasing annual production from 56,452 in 1971 to 100,000. However, the peak production under BLMC was 62,834 in 1972, in spite of exports increasing from one car in 1971 to more than 17,000 in 1974. Demonstrating their ambitions, the British company installed as managing director one of their youngest UK based senior executives, the 32-year-old former financial controller Geoffrey Robinson. Three years later, BLMC ran out of money and was nationalised by the UK government.

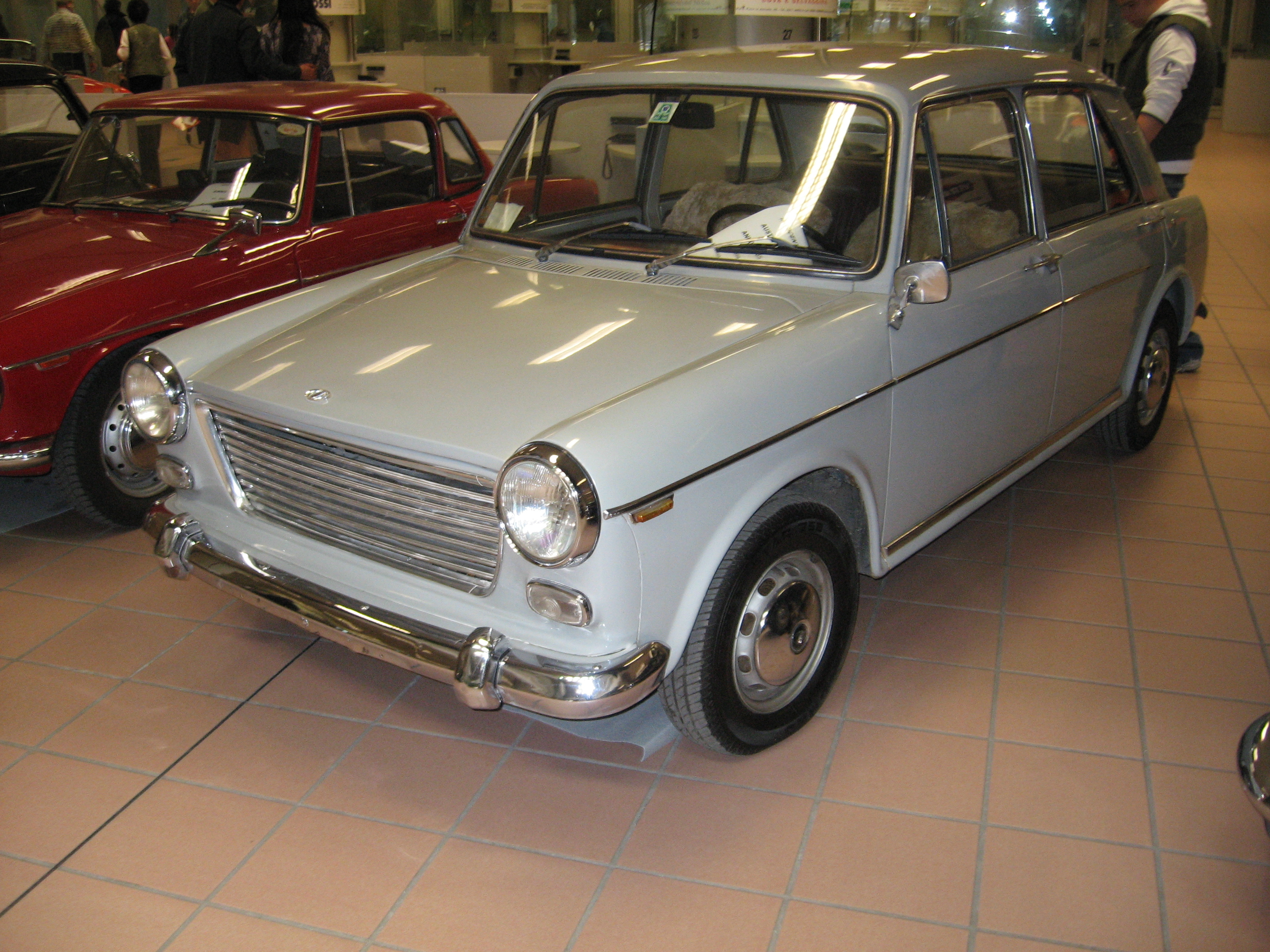
Innocenti I4

In February 1976, the company passed to Alejandro de Tomaso and was reorganised by the De Tomaso Group under the name Nuova Innocenti. Benelli had a share and British Leyland retained five percent with De Tomaso owning forty-four percent with the aid of a rescue plan from GEPI (an Italian public agency intended to provide investment for troubled corporations). Management was entirely De Tomaso's responsibility, however, and later in 1976, GEPI and De Tomaso combined their 95% of Innocenti (and all of Maserati) into one new holding company.

However, with the loss of the original Mini, the Austin I5 and the (slow-selling) Regent, sales were in free fall. Production was nearly halved in 1975 and was down to about a fifth of the 1974 levels in 1976. After this crisis, the new Bertone-bodied Mini began selling more strongly and production climbed to a steady 40,000 per annum by the end of the 1970s. The first models had Bertone-designed five-seater bodywork and was available with Leyland's 998 cc and 1,275 cc engines.

Exports, which had been carried out mainly by British Leyland's local concessionaires, began drying up in the early eighties as BL did not want to see internal competition from the Innocenti Mini. Sales to France (Innocenti's biggest export market) ended in 1980, with German sales coming to a halt in 1982. Around the same time, the engine deal with Leyland ended and production soon dropped into the low twenty thousands. Having lost their engine supply as well as their entire export dealer net, Innocenti found themselves without a product and the means of selling it.

However, Daihatsu of Japan were in need of a European partner. In addition to providing drivetrains, Daihatsu gave Innocenti access to their burgeoning sales network, entering France, Belgium and Switzerland at first. Daihatsu gained access to the Italian market, and a means of entry into other European nations with steep barriers for Japanese-made cars. That Innocenti, like Daihatsu, was a small-car specialist only made the marriage even more suitable. And so it was that, from model year 1983 on, the Innocenti was completely re-engineered, now using the Daihatsu Charade's 993 cc three-cylinder engine and an entirely new suspension. The appearance did not change in the least, in spite of it being, in essence, a new car. De Tomaso developed a turbocharged version of this engine for Daihatsu which found use in both Innocenti and Daihatsu cars.

In addition to building their own cars, De Tomaso also had Innocenti use their factory capacity in producing bodywork for and providing final assembly of the Maserati Biturbo, Quattroporte and the Chrysler TC by Maserati. As production kept decreasing, and prices vis-à-vis competing Fiat products increased, Innocenti attempted to stay relevant by adding ever higher and more individual equipment. Innocenti kept building their own cars until early 1993. Beginning in 1990, when Fiat took over, Innocenti also sold Yugo's Koral and Brazilian-sourced versions of the Fiat Uno (Elba station wagon and Uno Mille) in the Italian market. These rebadged models were the last Innocentis; in February 1996 it was announced that sales of the marque would be halted at the end of June 1997.

== 2018 Lambretta Relaunch ==
The Lambretta scooter was relaunched once again at the EICMA Milan Motorcycle Expo in November 2017. After the purchase of the Lambretta brand by Innocenti SA, now a Swiss consortium, a new scooter model was designed and launched. This was the V-special, available in 50 to 125 to 200cc engine sizes, and designed to meet Euro 4 standards. The scooter was designed in Austria by Austrian firm KISKA GmbH but produced in Asia. It saw exports to Australia, Philippines, Europe, the US and the UK. The company plans to reintroduce classic models at a later date.

== List of Innocenti vehicles ==
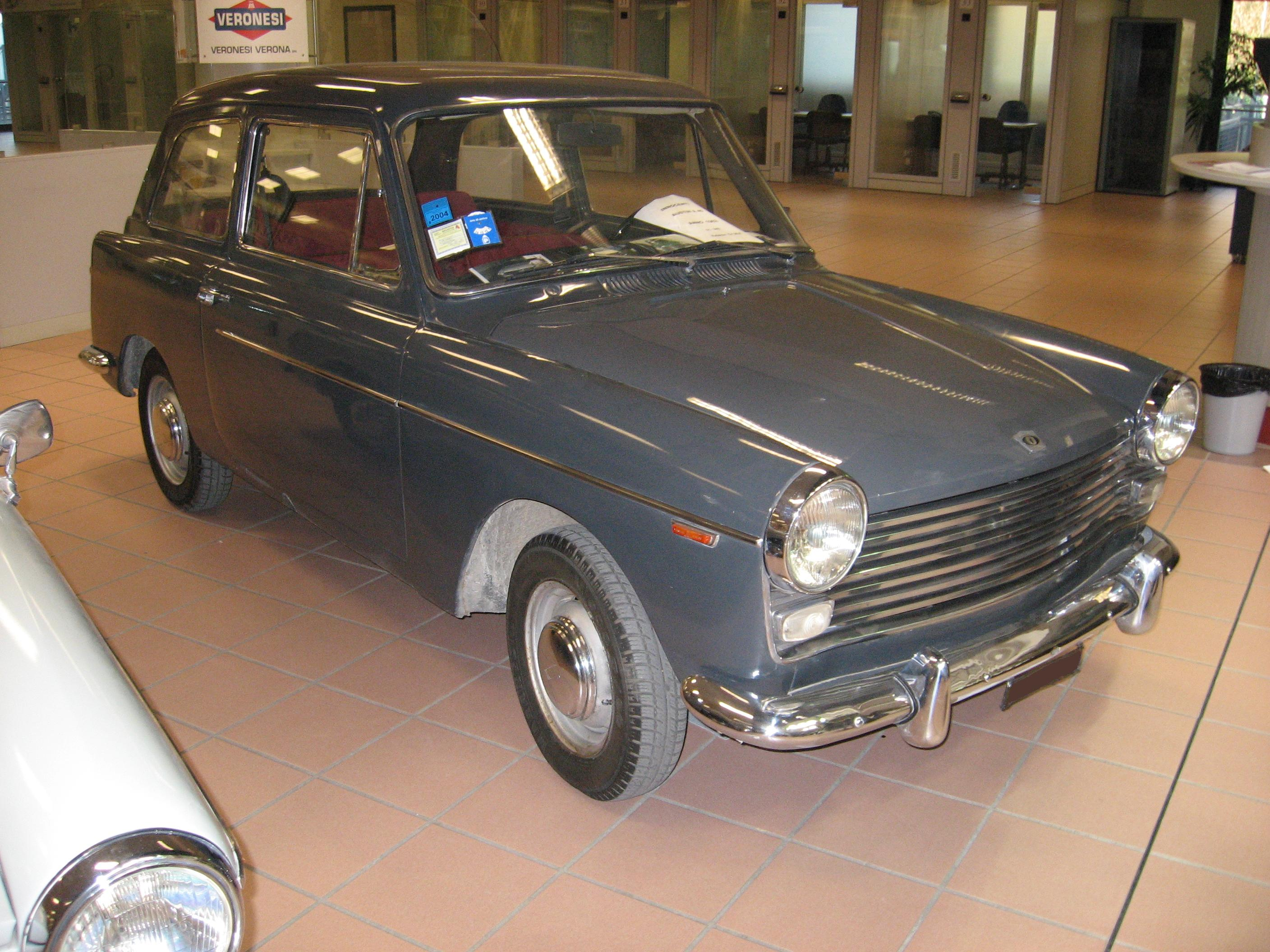
Innocenti A40

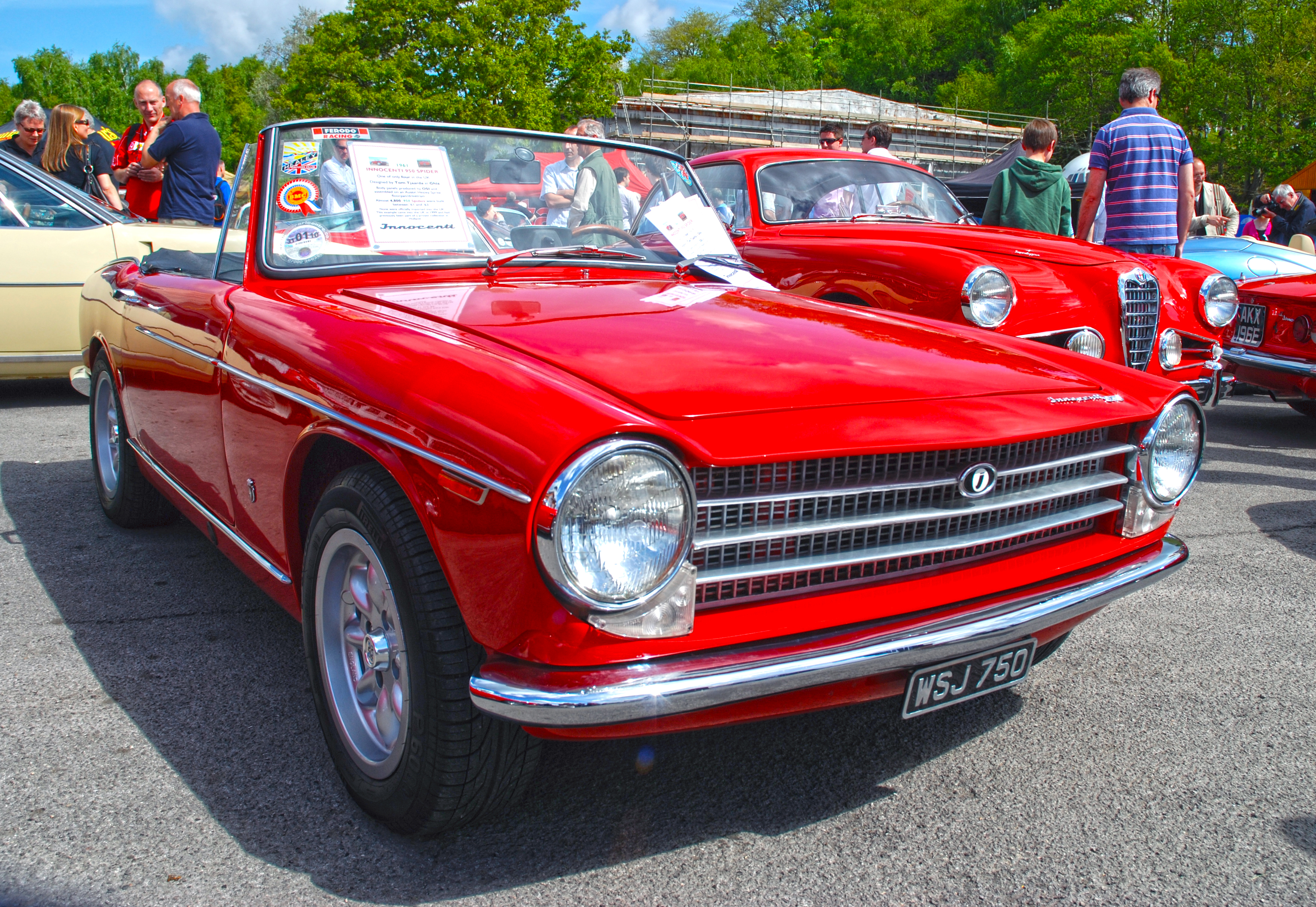
Innocenti 950-S spider

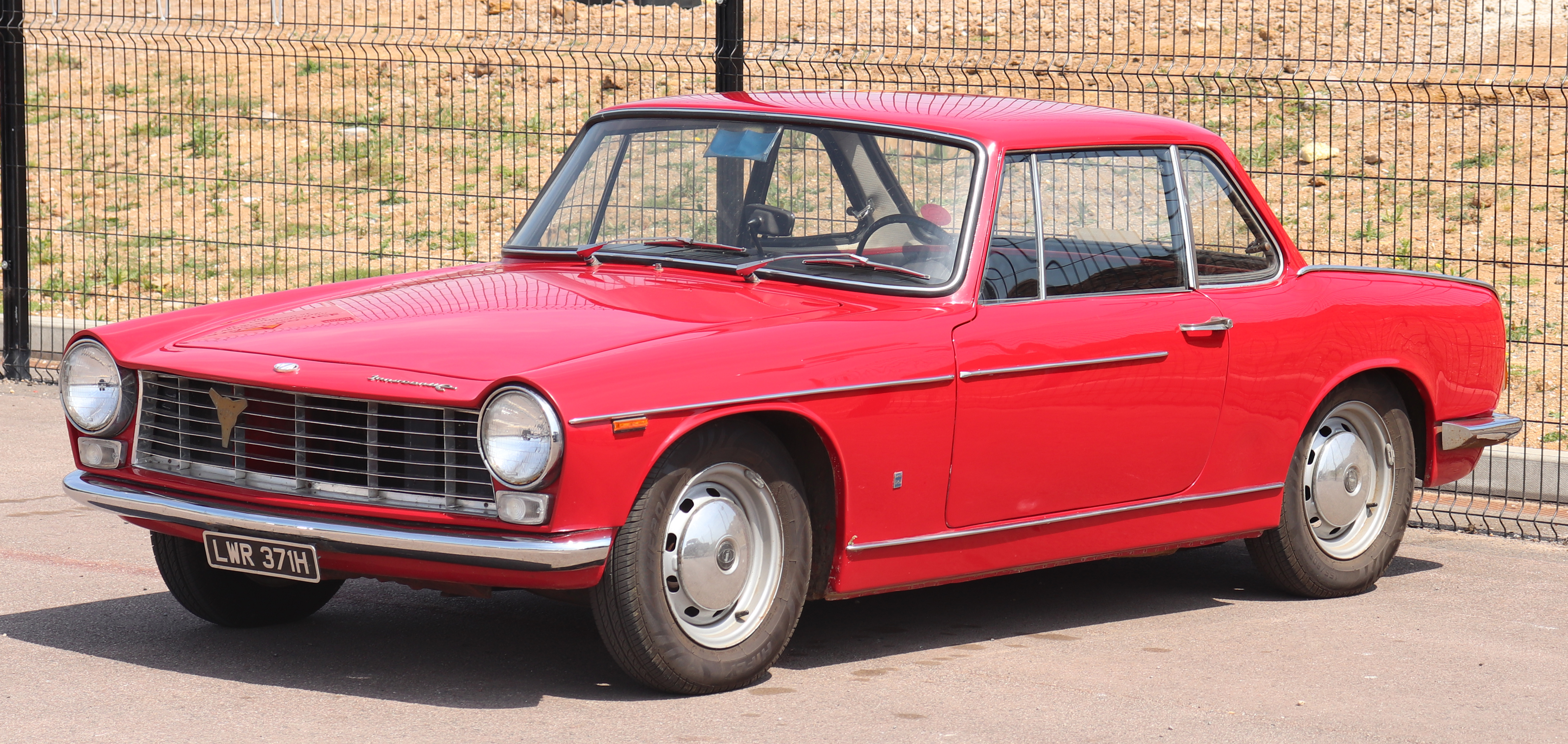
Innocenti C coupe

- 1945–1971 Lambretta (motorscooter)
- 1960–1967 A40/A40S Berlina/Combinata – hatchback Austin A40 Farina
- 1961–1968 950/1100 Spider – roadster based on Austin-Healey Sprite with original body designed by Ghia
- 1963–1974 IM3/IM3S/Austin I4/I5 – rebadged sedan BMC ADO16 (Austin/Morris 1100)
- 1963 Innocenti 186 GT – prototype of a coupé with a 1.8-litre Ferrari V6 engine
- 1965–1975 Mini – rebadged sedans and station wagons BMC ADO15 (Mini)
- 1966–1968 Innocenti C – a coupé, based on the Austin-Healey Sprite and powered by a 1098 cc four-cylinder engine. 795 examples were built.
- 1974–1975 Regent – Austin Allegro saloon
- 1974–1982 Innocenti Mini 90L and 120L – Bertone rebodied Mini
- 1976–1987 Innocenti Mini de Tomaso – sport version of Innocenti Mini developed by de Tomaso, initially equipped with BLMC 1275 engine, since 1982 with 1.0-litre 3-cylinder turbocharged Daihatsu engine
- 1982–1992 3-Cilindri/Minitre/650/500 – further development of Innocenti Mini with Daihatsu 3-cylinder and 2-cylinder engines
- 1986–1992 Mini 990 – longer version of Innocenti Mini with 1.0-litre 3-cylinder Daihatsu engine
- 1991–1993 Koral – Yugo Koral rebadged for the Italian market
- 1991–1996 Innocenti Elba – Re-badged version of the Brazilian Fiat Elba, which was based on the Fiat Uno (previously sold as Fiat Duna Weekend)
- 1994–1996 Mille – Brazilian Fiat Mille for Italian market (not to be confused with the "Mini Mille" version manufactured between 1980 and 1982) (previously sold as Fiat Uno CS)
- 1995–1997 Mille Clip - Polish Fiat Uno (second series) for Italian Market.

== Production ==
| Year (Note: 1969–1978 production and export numbers are from Quattroruote, March 1979.) | 1966 | 1967 | 1968 | 1969 | 1970 | 1971 | 1972 | 1973 | 1974 | 1975 |
|---|---|---|---|---|---|---|---|---|---|---|
| Production | 35,967 | 46,026 | 50,540 | 47,760 | 50,630 | 61,950 | 62,834 | 58,471 | 60,711 | 33,061 |
| Exports | | | | 10 | 1 | 1 | 205 | 6,690 | 17,421 | 11,003 |
| Year | 1976 | 1977 | 1978 | 1979 | 1980 | 1981 | 1982 | 1983 | 1984 | 1985 |
| Production | 12,789 | 38,120 | 40,719 | 39,991 | 39,770 | 23,187 | 21,646 | 13,688 | 17,151 | 15,218 |
| Exports | 754 | 10,169 | 8,862 | | | | | | | |
| Year | 1986 | 1987 | 1988 | 1989 | 1990 | 1991 | 1992 | 1993 | | |
| Production | 12,687 | 10,443 | 10,331 | 10,100 | 4,221 | 10,550 | 8,600 | 0 | | |

== See also ==
- List of motor scooter manufacturers and brands
- List of automobile manufacturers of Italy
