= Ferdinando Innocenti =

Italian businessman

- Pronunciation: ferdiˈnando innoˈtʃɛnti
- Born: 1 September 1891; Pescia, Italy
- Died: 21 June 1966 (aged 74); Varese
- Known for: Founder of Innocenti and Lambretta

Ferdinando Innocenti (Italian pronunciation: [ferdiˈnando innoˈtʃɛnti]; 1 September 1891, in Pescia, Italy – 21 June 1966, in Varese) was an Italian businessman who founded the machinery-works company Innocenti and was the manufacturer of the Lambretta motorscooter.

== Biography ==
Ferdinando Innocenti grew up in Grosseto. He was the son of Dante Innocenti, a blacksmith who owned two hardware stores and a small ironmongery (Ferramenta Innocenti) where Ferdinando used to work. In 1923, he moved to Rome with his brother to grow their sales and they found there a booming construction industry boosted by the rise of fascism. The brothers sold metal pipes and scaffolding kits. In 1931, Innocenti opened a large factory in Rome and diversified the company's ventures. At the dawn of World War II, his company was awarded important contracts by the Ministry of War. His factories manufactured 17% of Italy's total wartime production.

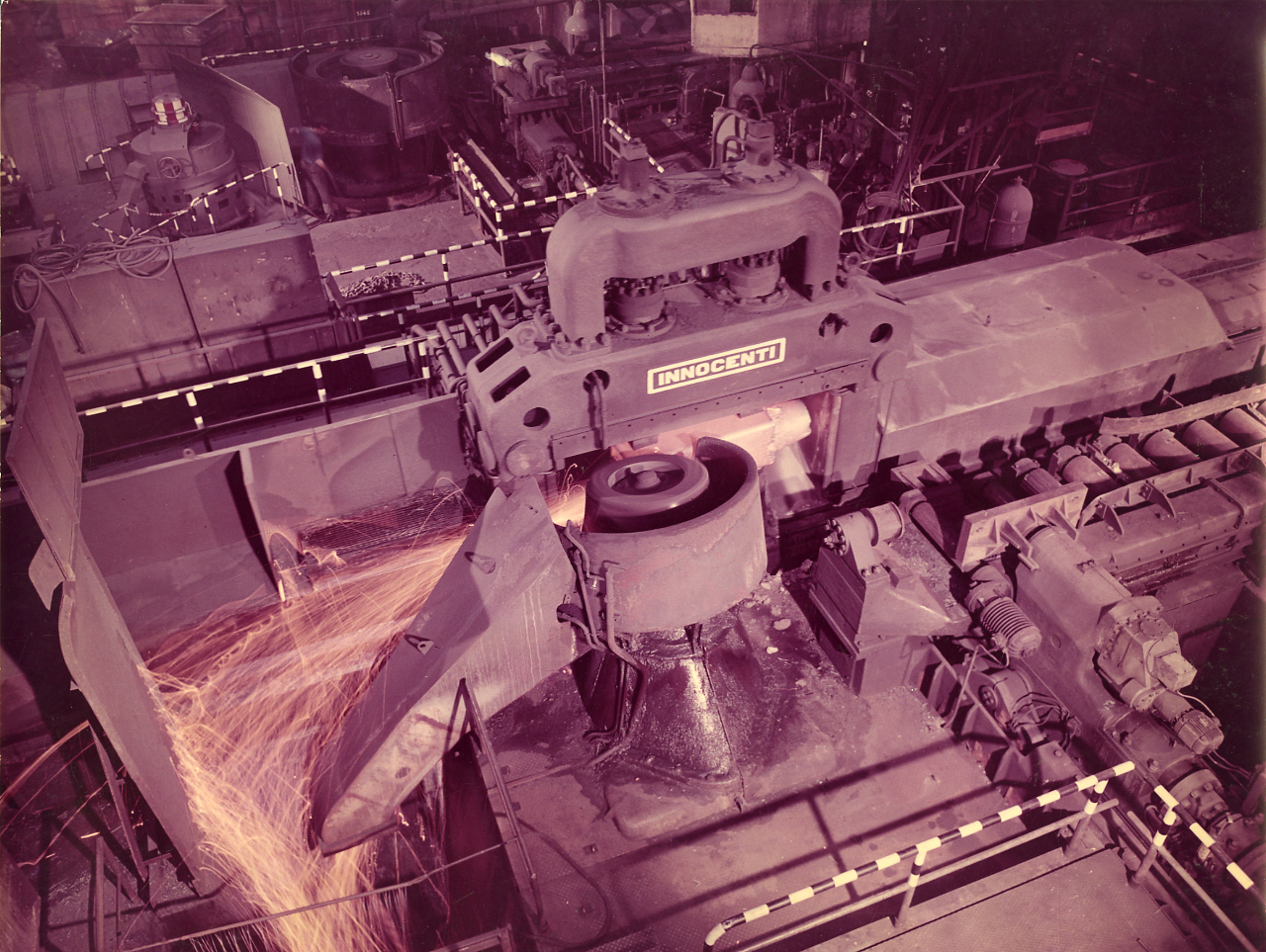
Innocenti machinery, photo by Paolo Monti, 1960

After the war, he repurposed his factories for peacetime industries and launched the production of the low-cost motor scooter Lambretta in 1947.

In 1958, his son Luigi became vice-president of the company and developed automobile industries. By 1966, BMC models – primarily at that date versions of the Mini and the Austin/Morris 1100, assembled to a high standard at Innocenti's Milan plant – accounted for three percent of the Italian passenger car market.

Ferdinando Innocenti died on 21 June 1966 of a heart attack at the age of 74. On his death, his son Luigi succeeded him in the top job at the company he had founded. He stopped the production of the Lambretta in 1971 and sold the motor division to British Leyland in 1972.

Despite being an important player in the Italian car industry, Ferdinando Innocenti did not have a driving licence. Fiat owns the brand name "Innocenti" but hasn't used it since 1997.
