= Mitten Rock =

Mountain in New Mexico, United States

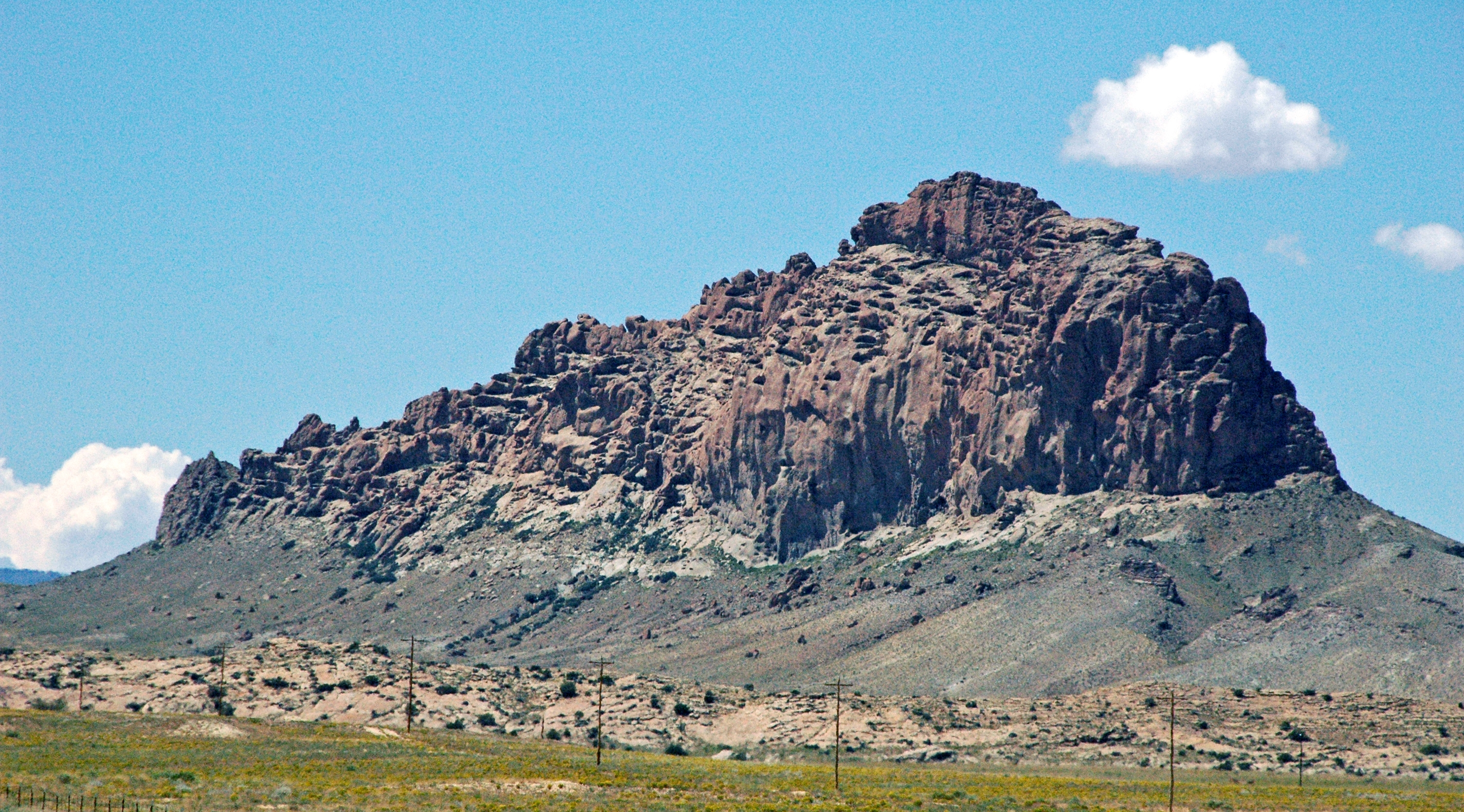
- Northeast aspect

Highest point
- Elevation: 6,557 ft (1,999 m)
- Prominence: 807 ft (246 m)
- Parent peak: White Rock (6,634 ft)
- Isolation: 5.37 mi (8.64 km)
- Coordinates: 36°36′33″N 108°56′40″W

Geography
- Location within New Mexico Location within the United States
- Location: San Juan County, New Mexico, US
- Parent range: Chuska Mountains; Colorado Plateau
- Topo map: USGS Mitten Rock

Geology
- Rock age: Oligocene
- Mountain type: Volcanic plug
- Rock type: Volcanic breccia

Mitten Rock is a 6,557-foot (1,999-meter) elevation summit located on Navajo Nation land in San Juan County of northwest New Mexico, United States. Mitten Rock is set in the northeastern part of the Navajo Volcanic Field, a volcanic field that includes intrusions and flows of minette and other unusual igneous rocks which formed around 30 million years ago during the Oligocene. Mitten Rock is one of the major diatremes of the Four Corners area, and with significant relief as it rises 900 feet (270 meters) above the high-desert plain. It is situated about 8.5 miles (13.7 km) southwest of Shiprock, the most famous of these diatremes. Mitten Rock has also been known as "Little Ship Rock." This landmark is called Tséłkǫ, meaning "Rock Is Fire" in the Navajo language. This geographical feature's descriptive name was applied by the US Army in 1892, and was officially adopted in 1915 by the U.S. Board on Geographic Names. Precipitation runoff from this feature drains into Little Shiprock Wash, which is part of the San Juan River drainage basin. According to the Köppen climate classification system, Mitten Rock is located in a semi-arid climate zone with cold winters and hot summers.

== Geology ==
Mitten Rock is composed of felsic minette, unusual even for the Navajo volcanic field. Felsic minette has a silica content of up to 60%, versus the more typical 48% to 52% silica content of the more typical mafic minettes of most vents in the volcanic field. This magma was likely formed by crystal fractionation of more typical mafic minette magma.

== See also ==
- Rock formations in the United States
- Volcanic plug
