= Chaistla Butte =

Landform in Navajo County, Arizona, US

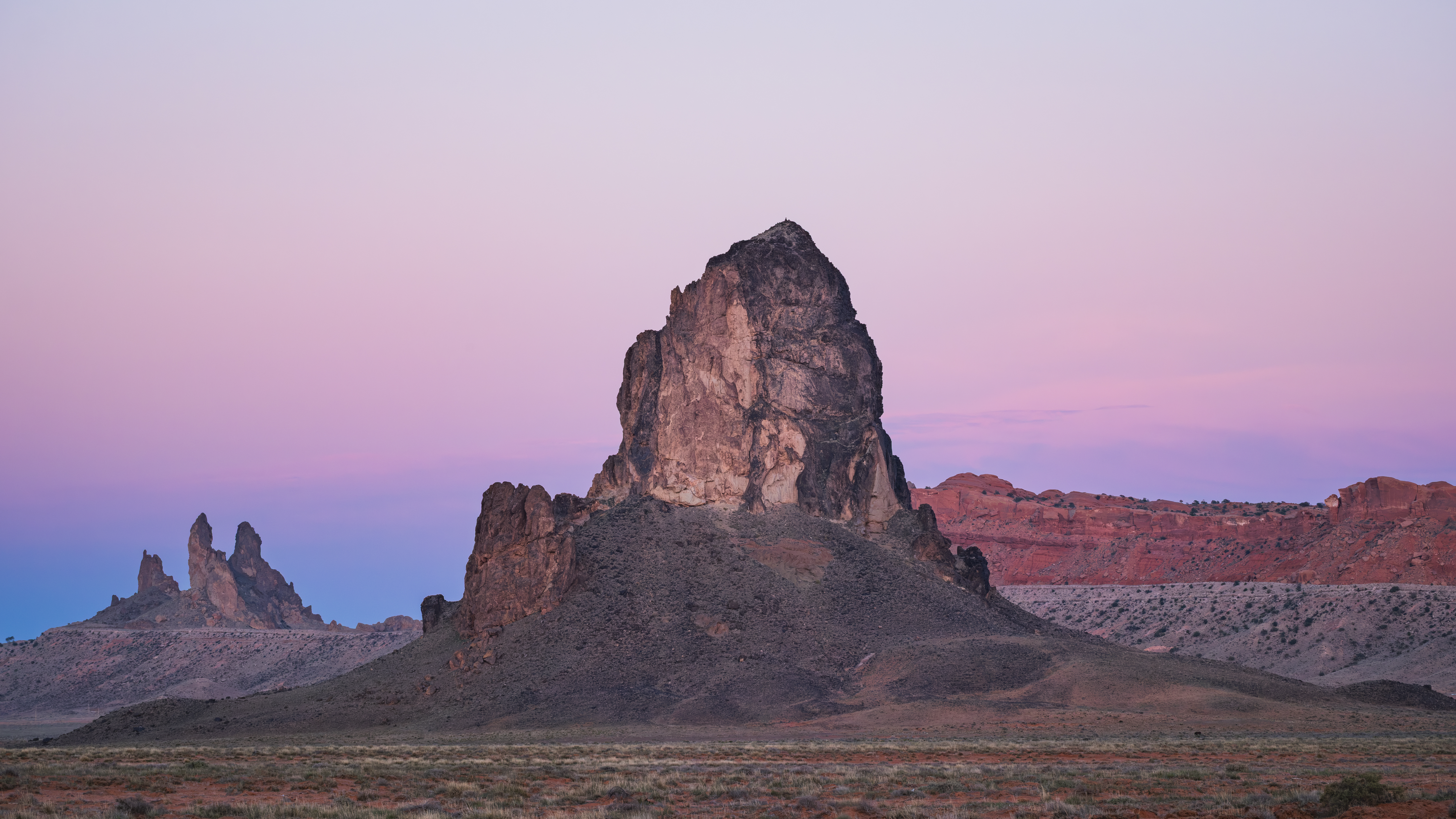
- Northwest view at dusk

Highest point
- Elevation: 6,098 ft (1,859 m)
- Prominence: 548 ft (167 m)
- Parent peak: Segeke Butte (6,721 ft)
- Isolation: 2.36 mi (3.80 km)
- Coordinates: 36°46′51″N 110°12′26″W

Geography
- Location within Arizona Location within the United States
- Location: Navajo Reservation; Navajo County, Arizona, U.S.
- Parent range: Colorado Plateau
- Topo map: USGS Agathla Peak

Geology
- Rock age: Oligocene
- Rock type: Volcanic breccia

Climbing
- Easiest route: class 5.x climbing

Chaistla Butte is a 6,098-foot (1,859 m) elevation summit located south of Monument Valley, in Navajo County of northeast Arizona. It is situated 4.5 miles (7.2 km) northeast of the community of Kayenta, on Navajo Nation land, and can be seen from Highway 163. It is one of the eroded volcanic plugs, or diatremes, of the Navajo Volcanic Field, which is a volcanic field that includes intrusions and flows of minette and other unusual igneous rocks which formed around 30 million years ago during the Oligocene. Chaistla Butte rises 400 feet (120 meters) above the Little Capitan Valley, and the 1,000 by 700-foot base pokes up from the Chinle Formation. Its neighbors include Agathla Peak and Owl Rock, three miles (4.8 km) to the north-northwest. Precipitation runoff from this feature drains into the Laguña Creek drainage basin. The chaistla name, which means "beaver pocket" or "beaver corner" in the Navajo language, was officially adopted in 1915 by the U.S. Board on Geographic Names. Navajo teachings have its name meaning "to support the sky's underside", such that if this butte were to fall, the world would end. It is also known as Turkey Butte.

== Climate ==
Spring and fall are the most favorable seasons to visit Chaistla Butte. According to the Köppen climate classification system, it is located in a semi-arid climate zone with cold winters and hot summers. Summers average 54 days above 90 °F (32 °C) annually, and highs rarely exceed 100 °F (38 °C). Summer nights are comfortably cool, and temperatures drop quickly after sunset. Winters are cold, but daytime highs are usually above freezing. Winter temperatures below 0 °F (−18 °C) are uncommon, though possible. This desert climate receives less than 10 inches (250 millimeters) of annual rainfall, and snowfall is generally light during the winter.

== Gallery ==
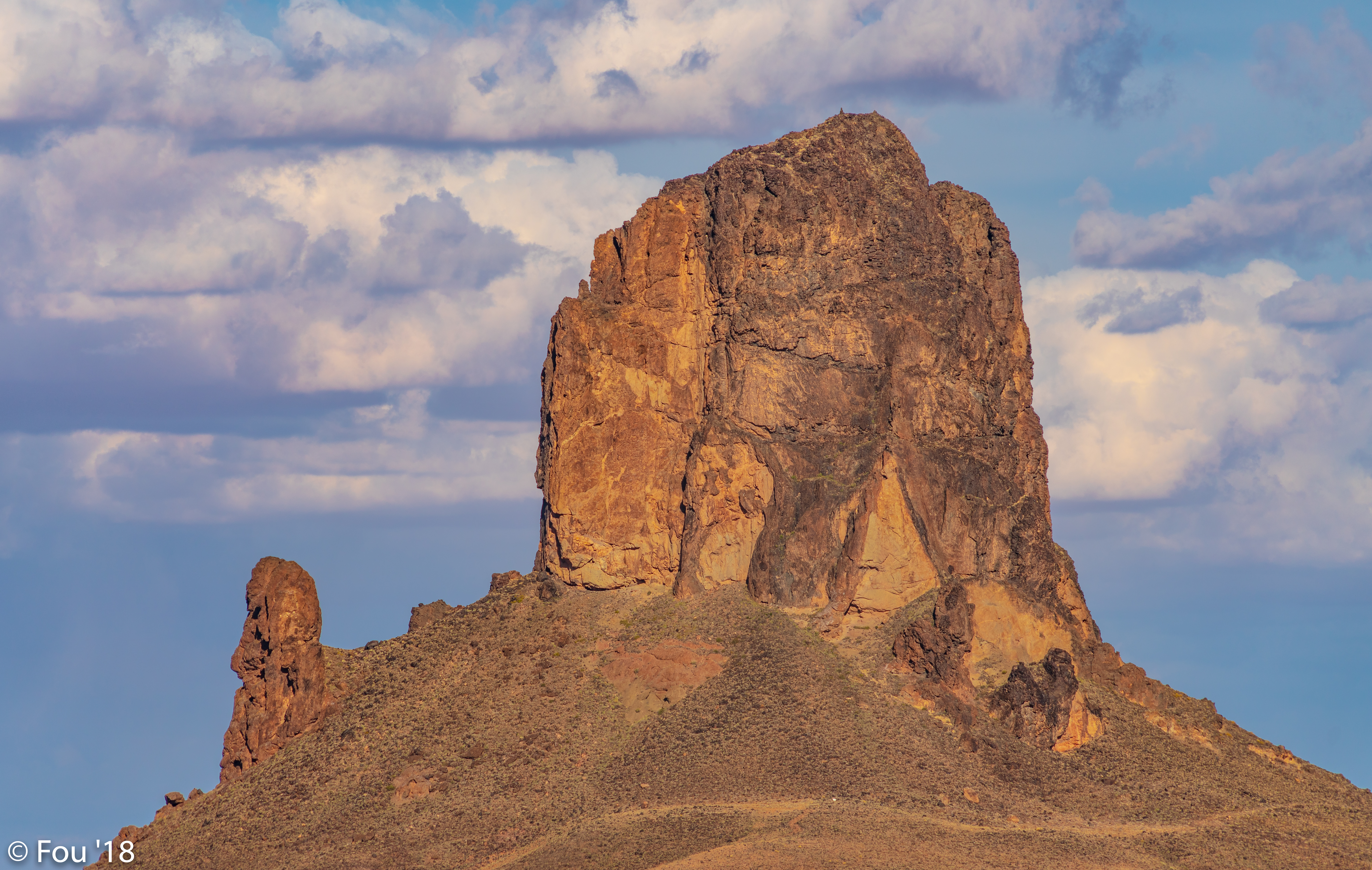
Chaistla Butte, aka Turkey Butte, (turkey's head to left)

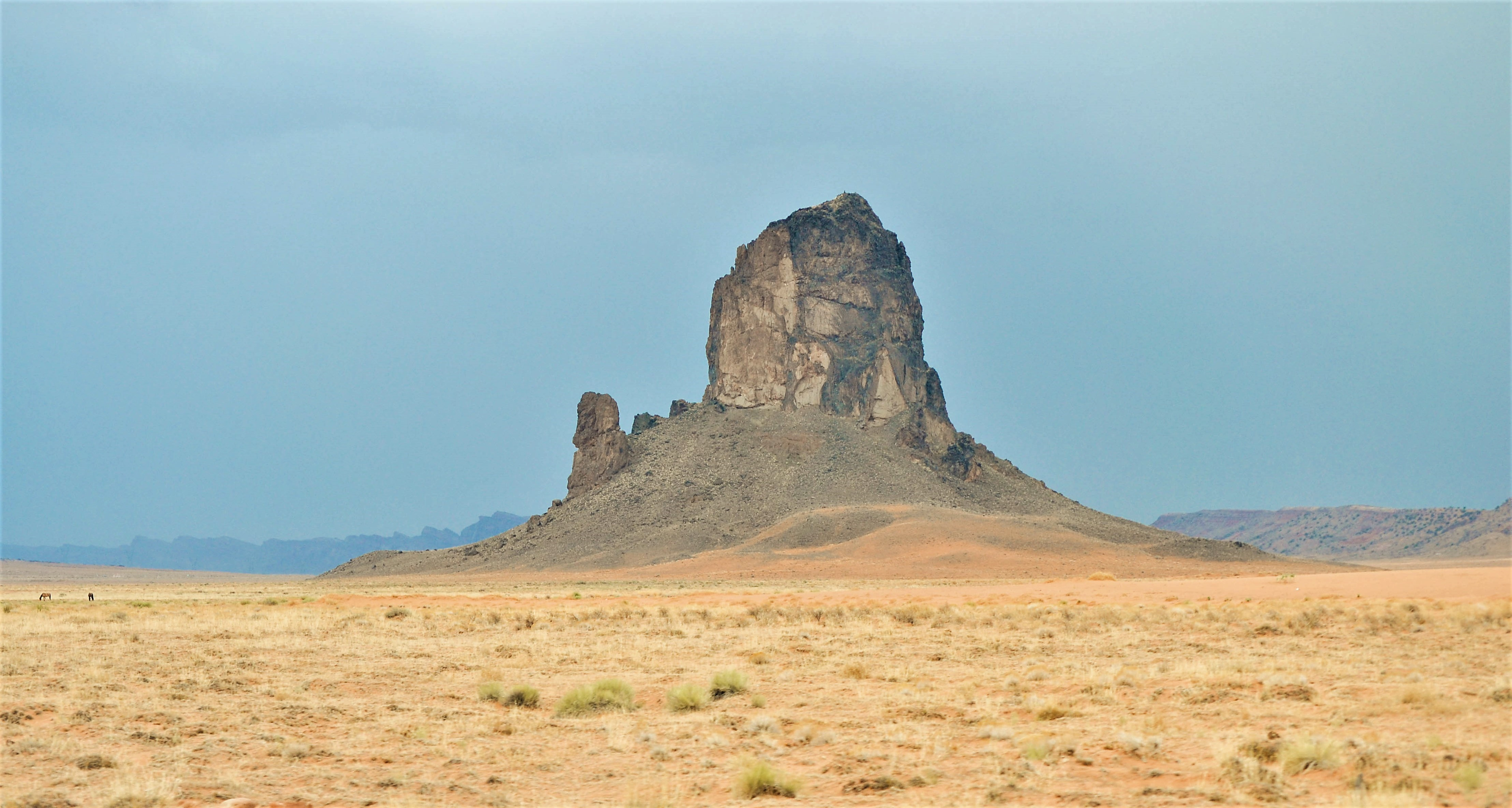

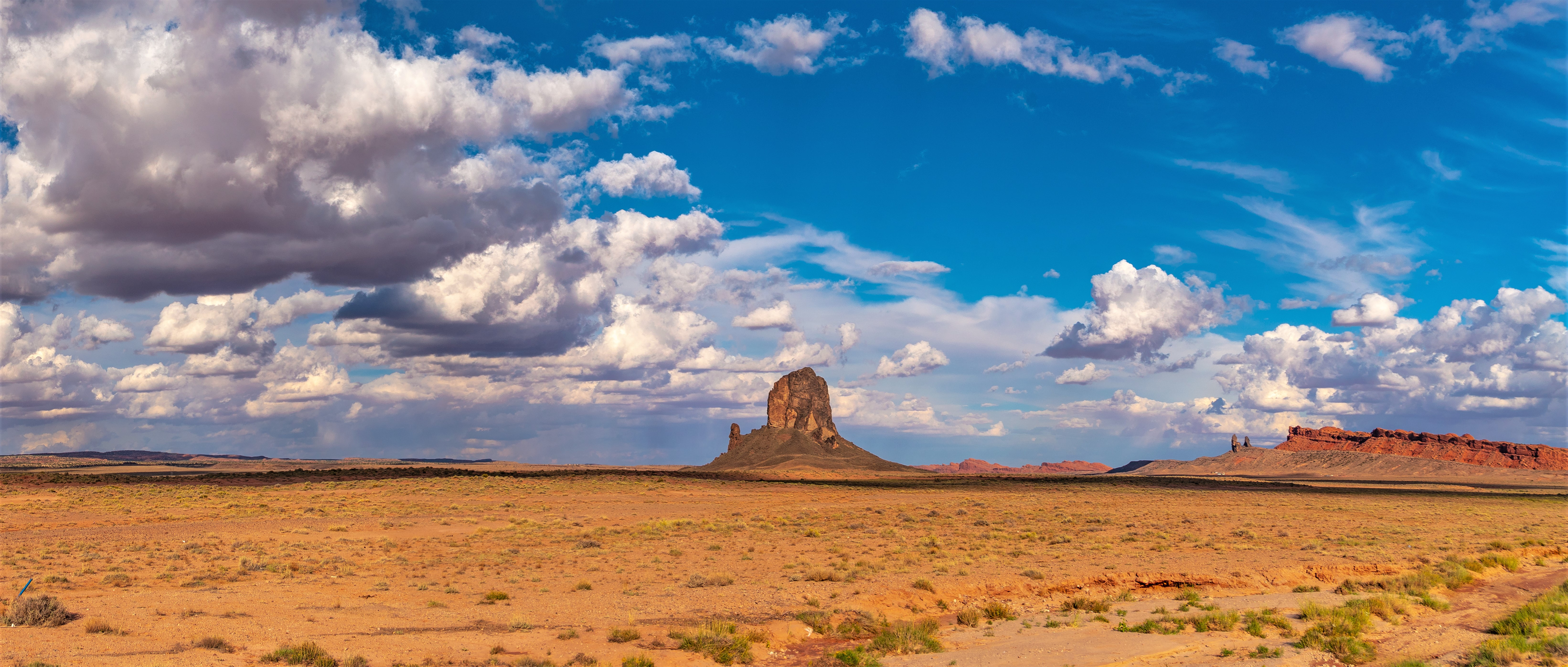

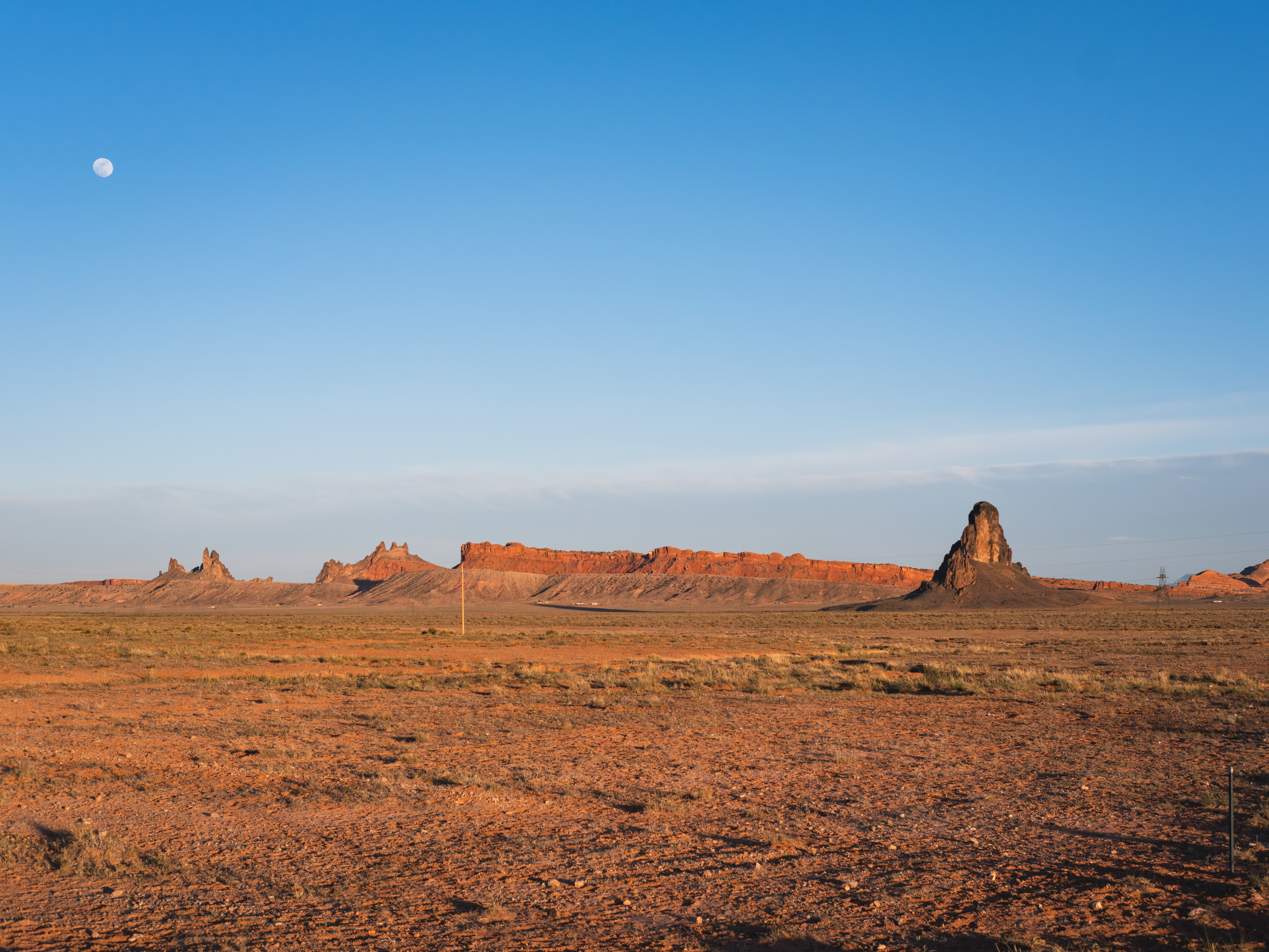

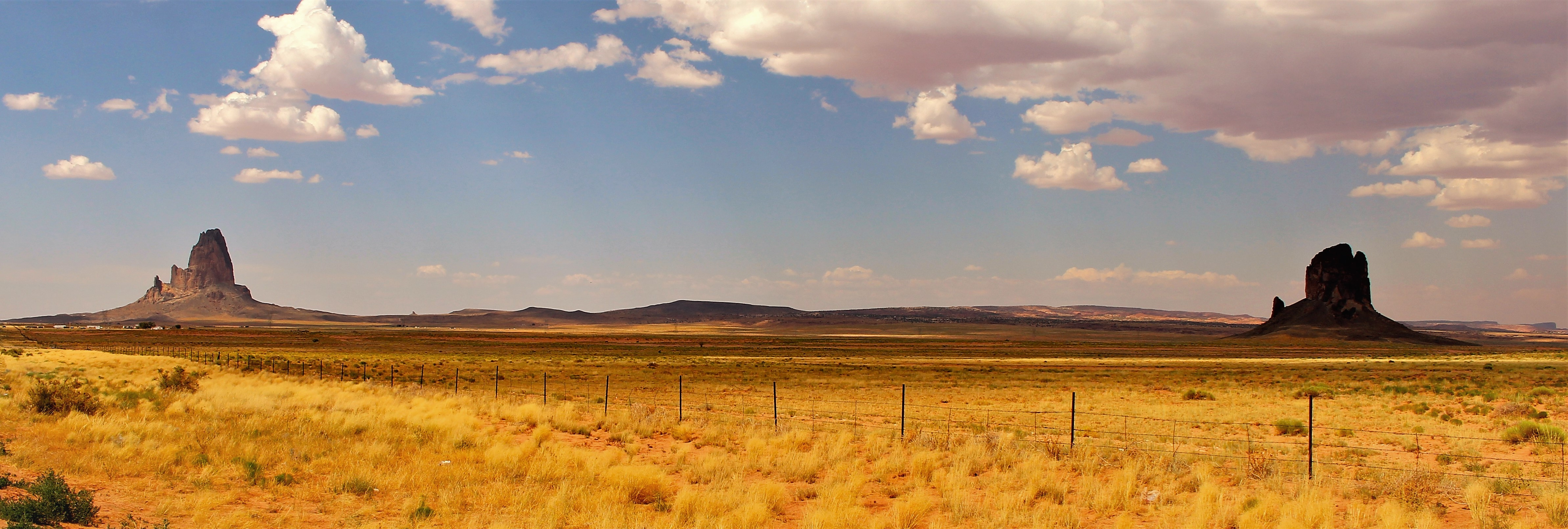
Agathla Peak (left) and Chaistla Butte (right) seen from the southwest along Highway 163

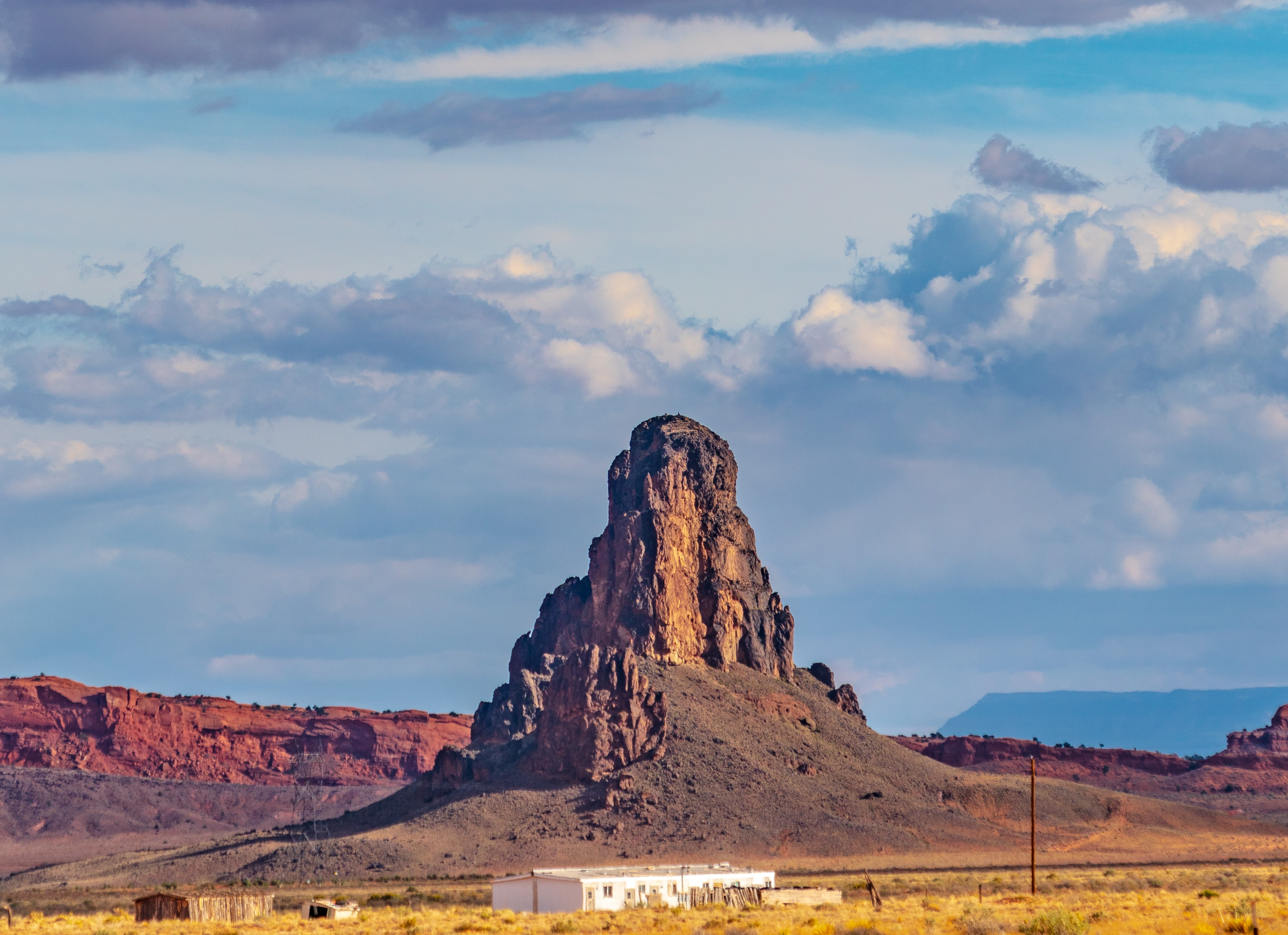
Northwest aspect

== See also ==
- Four Corners
- List of rock formations in the United States
