= Ford Butte =

Summit on Navajo Nation land in New Mexico

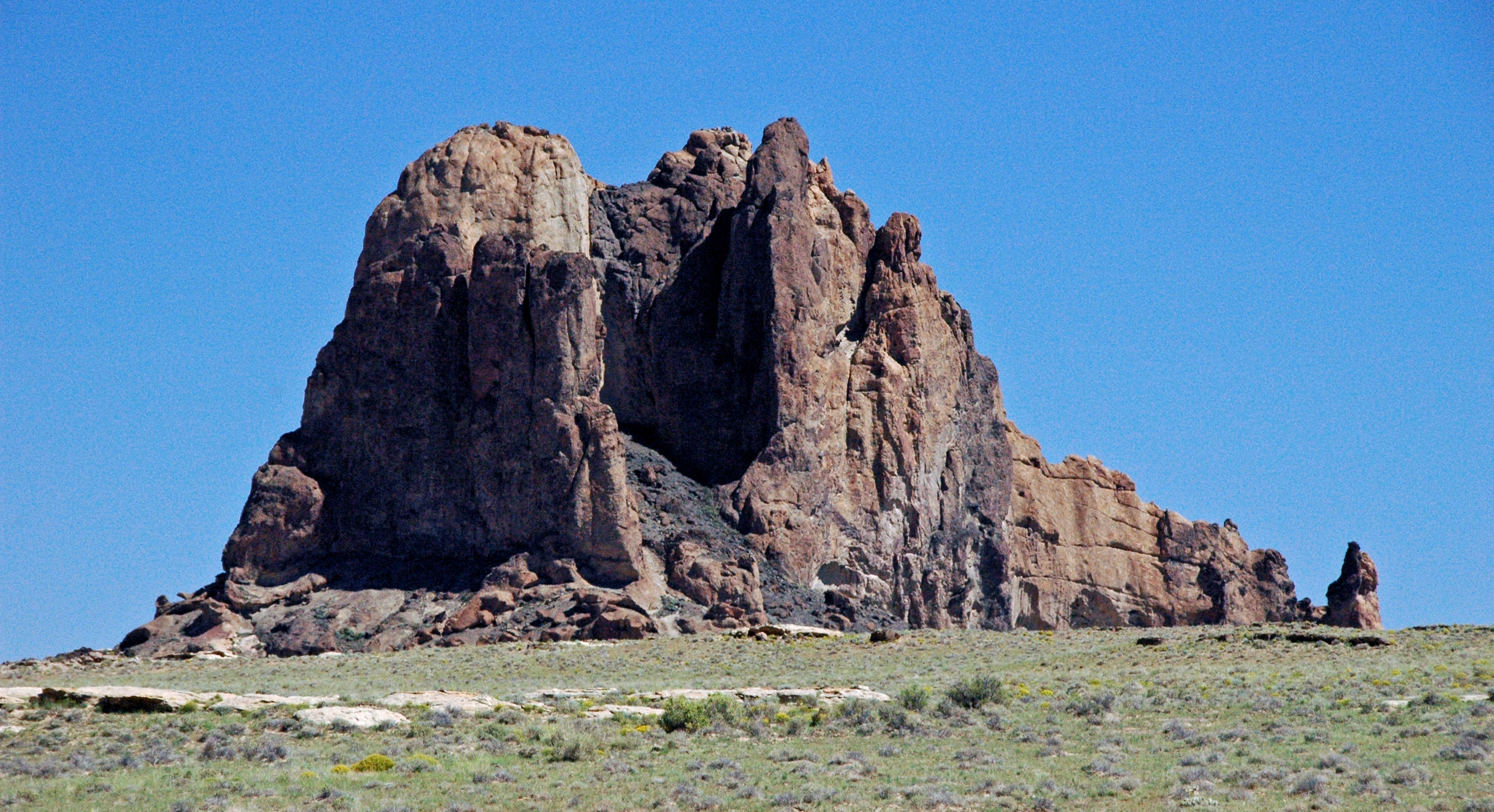
- Southwest aspect

Highest point
- Elevation: 6,156 ft (1,876 m)
- Prominence: 526 ft (160 m)
- Parent peak: Bennett Peak (6,471 ft)
- Isolation: 1.74 mi (2.80 km)
- Coordinates: 36°23′03″N 108°42′28″W

Geography
- Location within New Mexico Location within the United States
- Location: San Juan County, New Mexico, US
- Parent range: Chuska Mountains; Colorado Plateau
- Topo map: USGS Little Water

Geology
- Rock age: Oligocene
- Mountain type: Volcanic plug
- Rock type: Volcanic breccia

Climbing
- First ascent: 1971
- Easiest route: class 5.7 climbing

Ford Butte is a 6,156-foot (1,876-meter) elevation summit located on Navajo Nation land in San Juan County of northwest New Mexico, United States. It is a landmark set one mile east of U.S. Route 491, along with its nearest higher neighbor, Bennett Peak, on the opposite side of the highway. Ford Butte is one of the major diatremes of the Four Corners area, and with significant relief as it rises 450 feet (140 meters) above the high-desert plain. It is situated about 22 miles (35 km) south-southeast of Shiprock, the most famous of these diatremes. Ford Butte is set in the northeastern part of the Navajo Volcanic Field, a volcanic field that includes intrusions and flows of minette and other unusual igneous rocks which formed around 30 million years ago during the Oligocene. This geographical feature's name was officially adopted in 1915 by the U.S. Board on Geographic Names.

== Climbing ==
The first ascent of the north summit was made in 1971 by Mark Dalen and David Nordstrom via a class 5.7 route. The south summit was first climbed April 6, 1990, by Cameron Burns and Mike Baker via a class 5.9 route. Climbing here requires permission from Navajo authorities.

== Climate ==
According to the Köppen climate classification system, Ford Butte is located in a semi-arid climate zone with cold winters and hot summers. Ford Butte is within the Chaco River drainage basin.

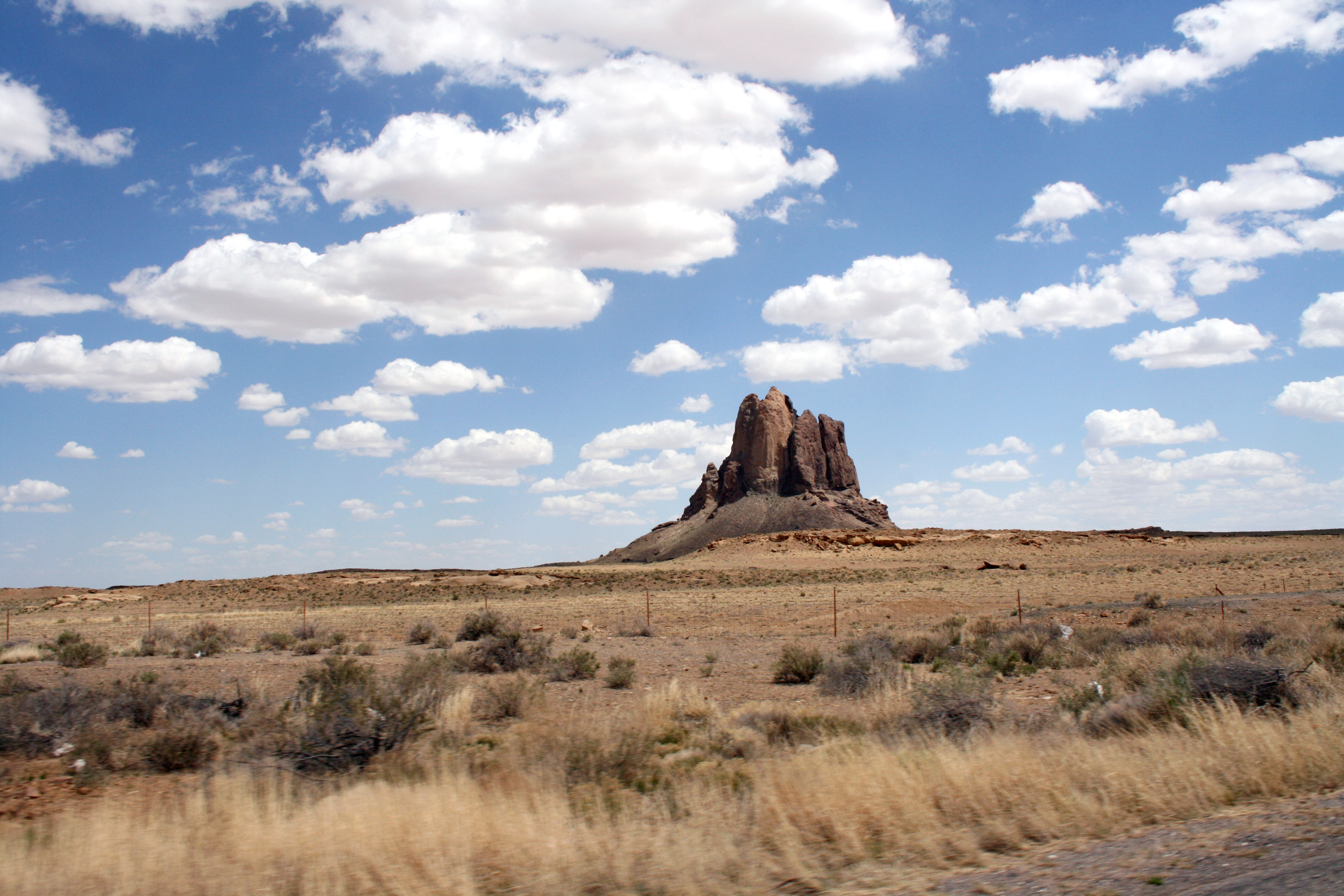
West aspect of Ford Butte

== See also ==
- Rock formations in the United States
- Volcanic plug
