= Agathla Peak =

Landform in Navajo County, Arizona

- Aghaałą́ (in Navajo); El Capitan (in Spanish)
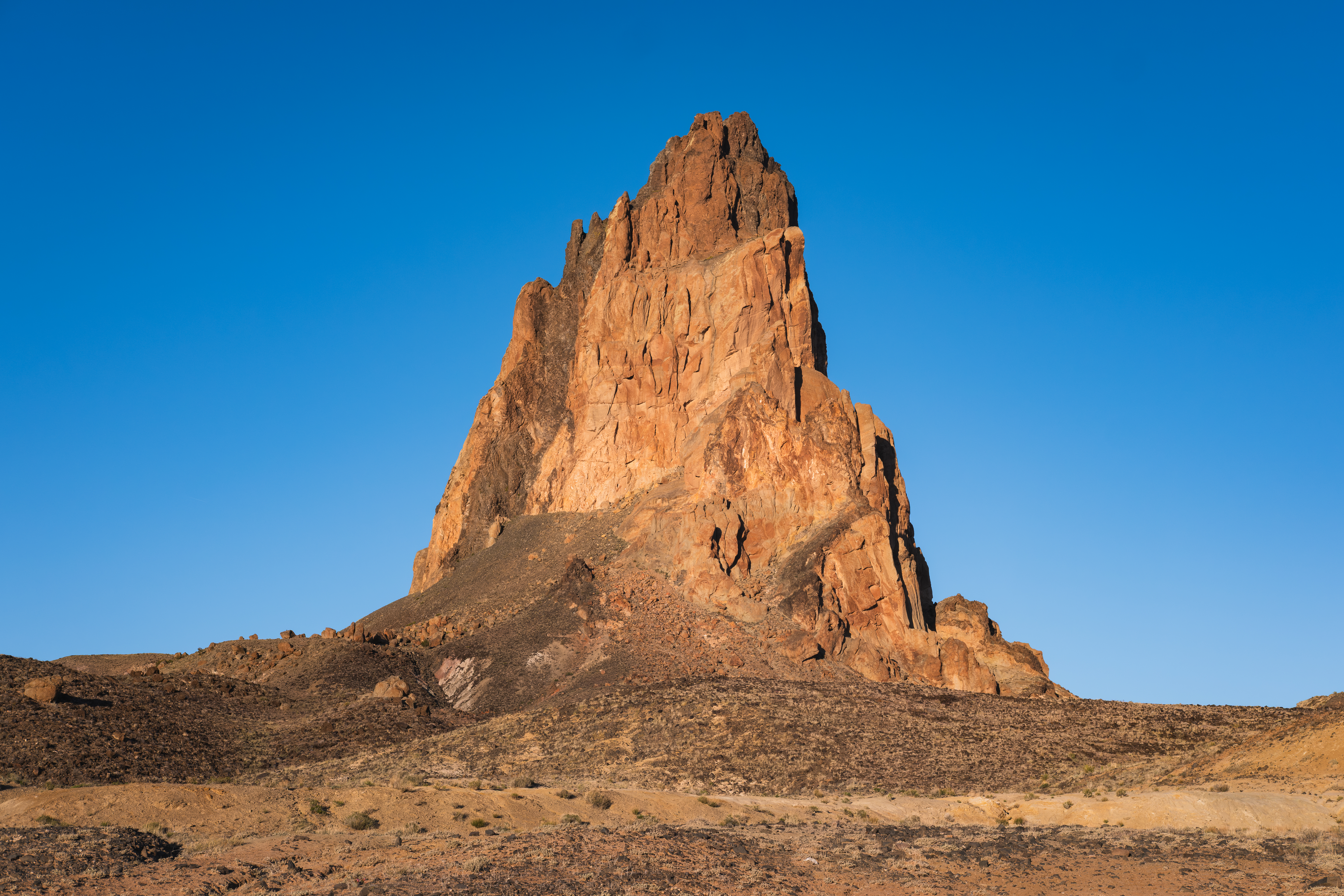

Highest point
- Elevation: 7,099 ft (2,164 m) NAVD 88
- Prominence: 1,436 ft (438 m)
- Coordinates: 36°49′34″N 110°13′31″W

Geography
- Location: Navajo Nation; Navajo County, Arizona, U.S.
- Topo map: USGS Agathla Peak

Geology
- Mountain type: eroded volcanic plug
- Volcanic field: Navajo Volcanic Field

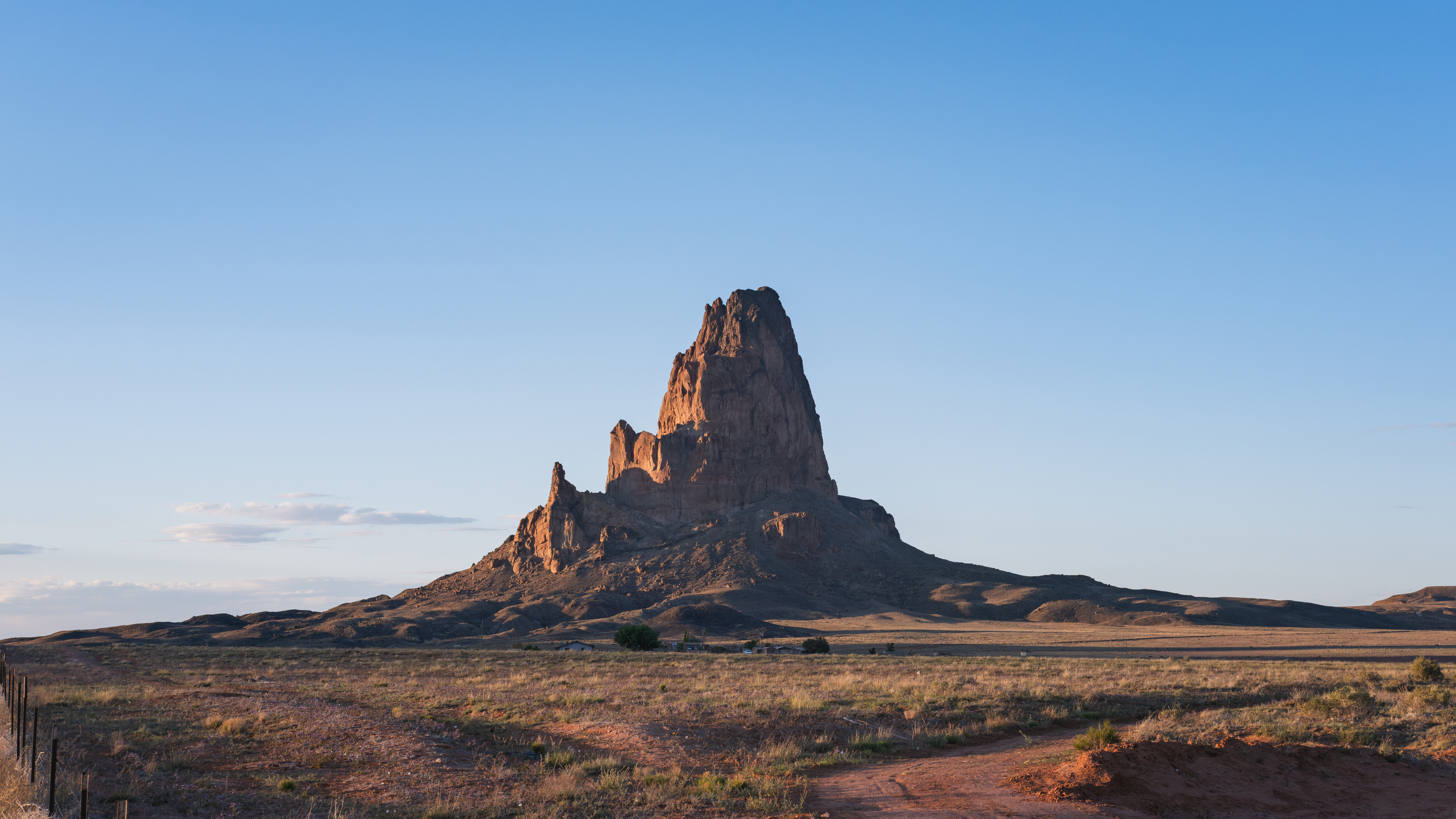
Agathla Peak

Agathla Peak or Agathlan (Navajo: Aghaałą́, Spanish: El Capitan) is a peak south of Monument Valley, Arizona, which rises over 1,500 feet (460 meters) above the surrounding terrain. It is 7 miles (11 km) north of Kayenta and is visible from U.S. Route 163. The English designation Agathla is derived from the Navajo name aghaałą́ meaning 'much wool', apparently for the fur of antelope and deer accumulating on the rock. The mountain is considered sacred by the Navajo.

Agathla Peak is an eroded volcanic plug consisting of volcanic breccia cut by dikes of an unusual igneous rock called minette. It is one of many such volcanic diatremes that are found in Navajo country of northeast Arizona and northwest New Mexico. Agathla Peak and Shiprock in New Mexico are the most prominent. These rocks are part of the Navajo Volcanic Field, in the southern Colorado Plateau. Ages of these minettes and associated more unusual igneous rocks cluster near 25 million years.

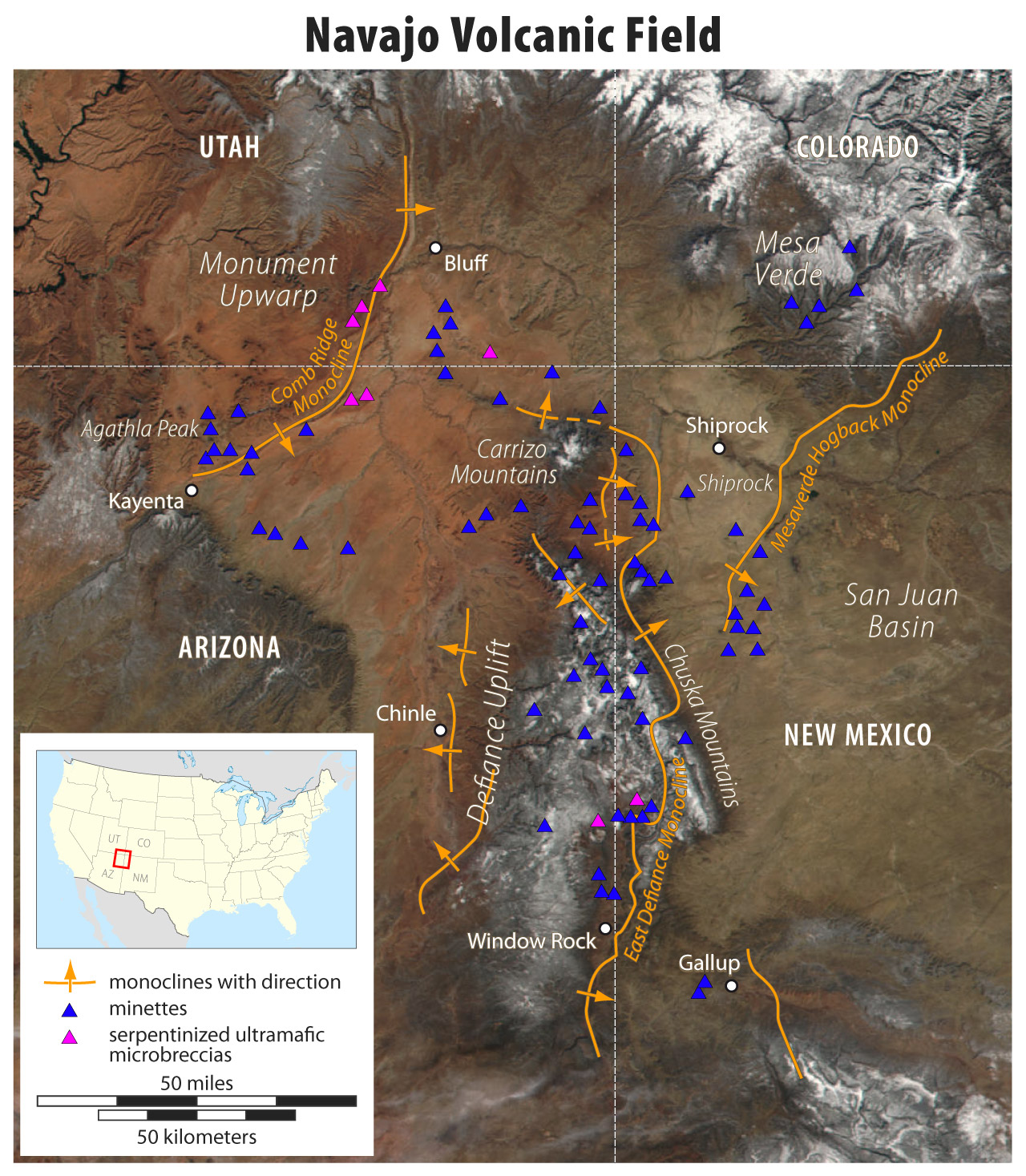
The Navajo Volcanic Field with Aglatha Peak

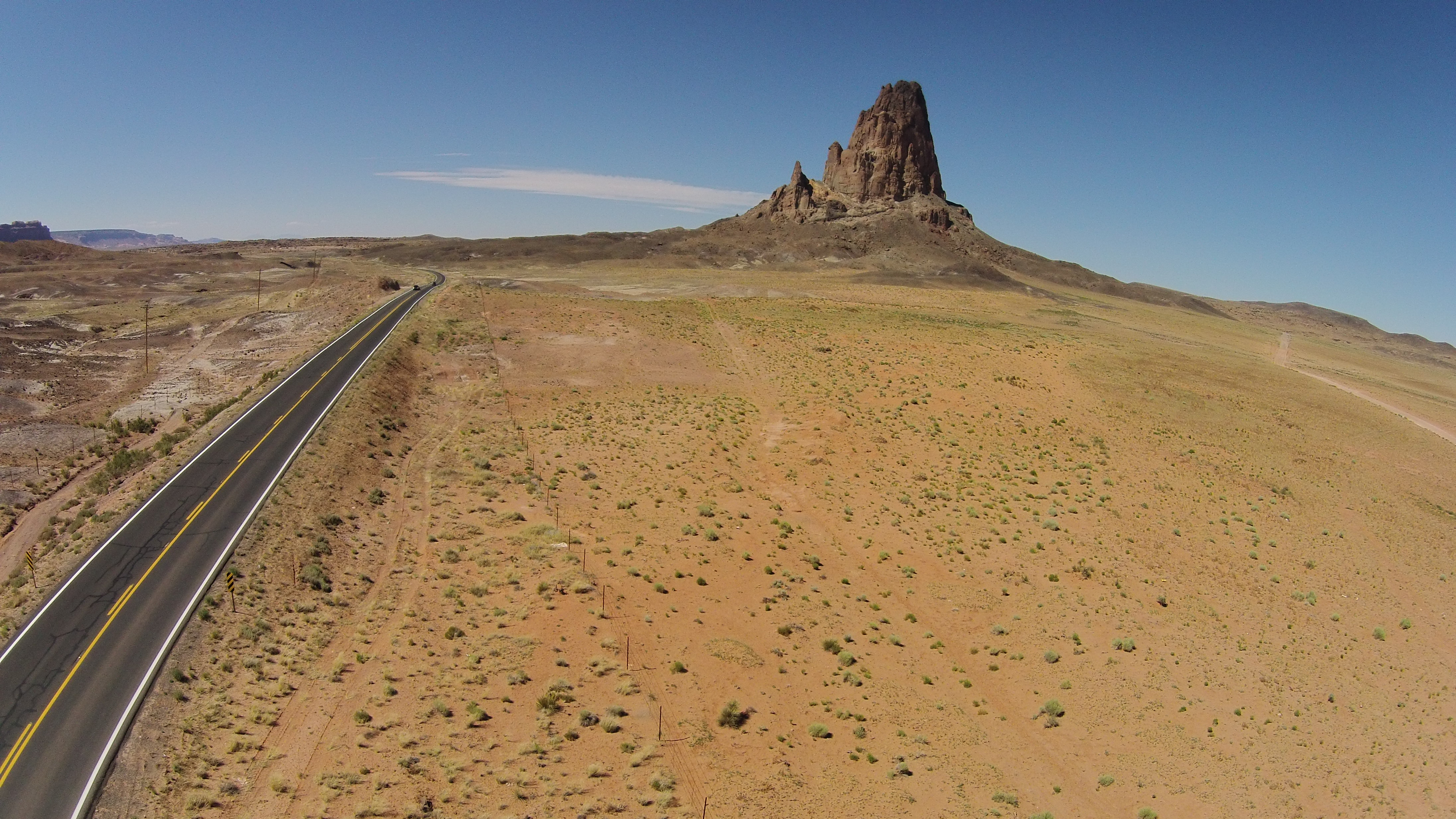
Aerial view of Agathla peak with the road to Monument Valley (163) in the foreground

== Climbing history ==
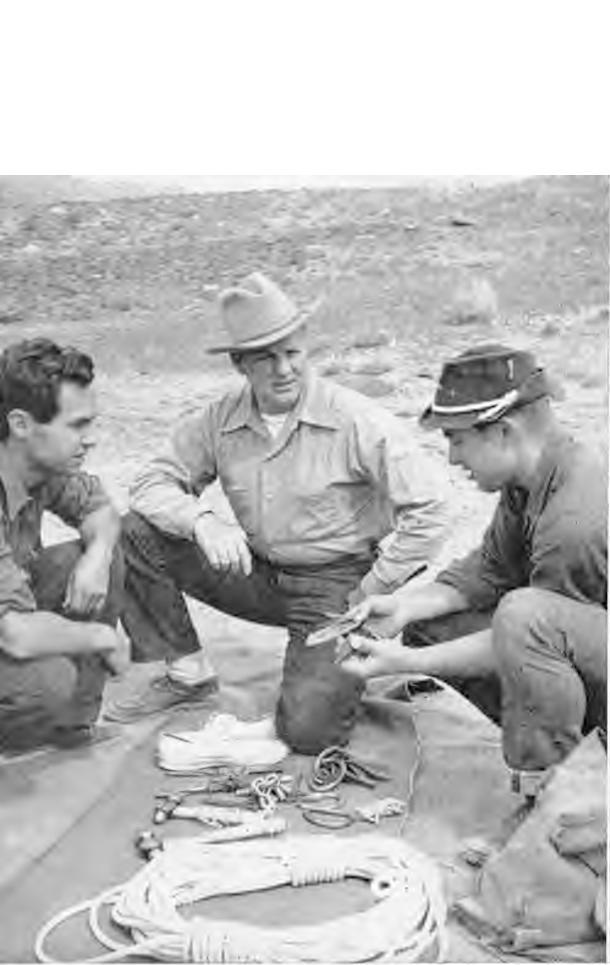
Herb Conn, Ray Garner, and Lee Pedrick (left to right), are checking their equipment prior to the first ascent.

Rock climbing is not currently allowed on Agathla Peak and surrounding Navajo Nation lands; however, in 1949 there were no such restrictions, and the first known ascent of the peak was done on May 29, 1949, by Ray Garner, Herb Conn, and Lee Pedrick. The climbers followed what is now called "West Face" route (class 5.8), which is 550 feet long, and they brought over 70 pounds of climbing equipment including: 50 pitons, 40 tamp-in bolts (plus two sets of drills, tamp tools and hammers), 15 carabiners, four 120-foot nylon ropes, and twelve quarts of water. The climbing took a whole day and they had to spend the night on the top before descending the next day.

== See also ==
- Owl Rock
- Chaistla Butte
