= Navajo volcanic field =

Volcanic field in southwestern United States

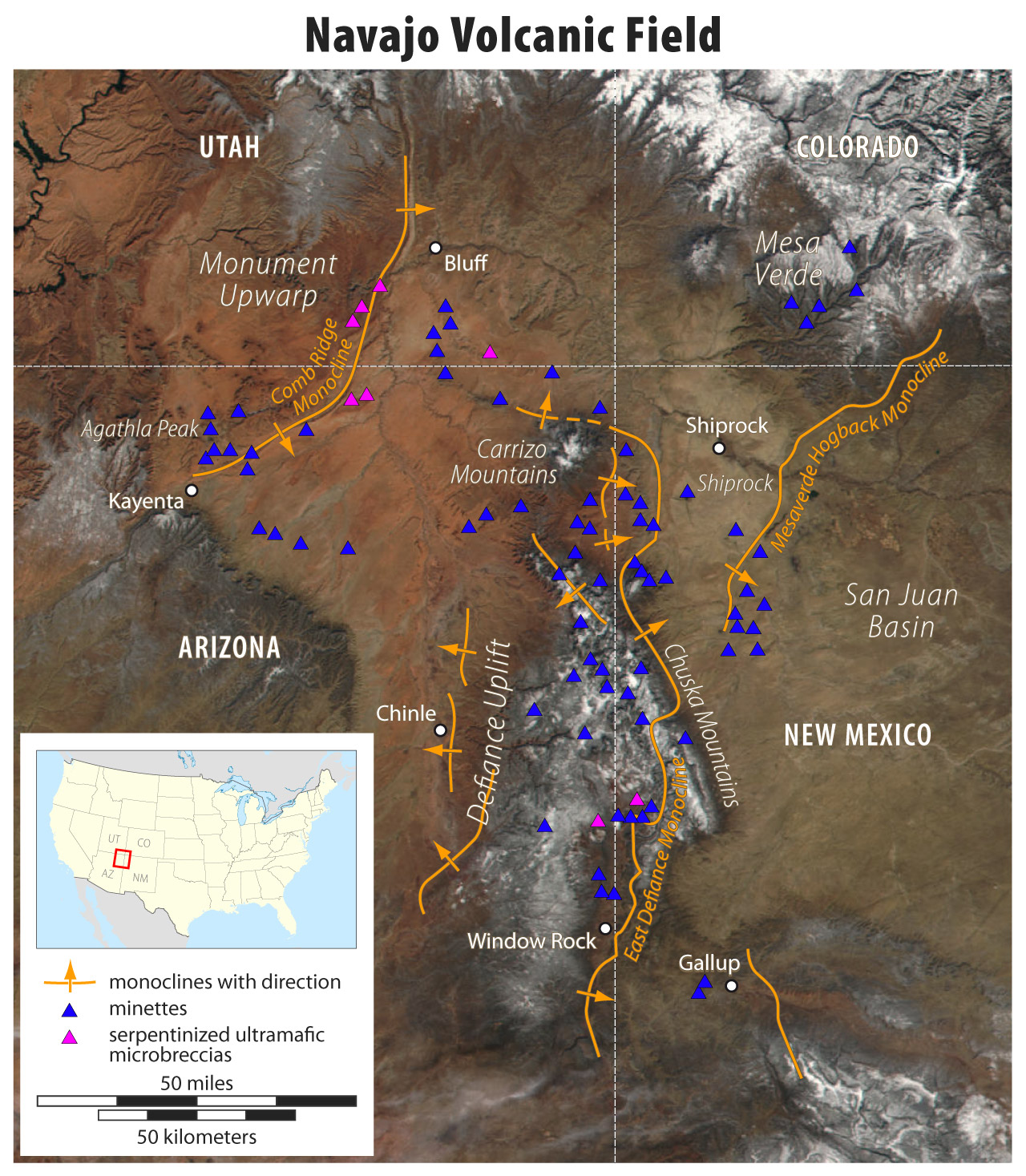
- Map of the Navajo volcanic field

Geography
- Location: Four Corners, United States

Geology
- Rock age: 26.2–24.7 Ma
- Mountain type: Volcanic field

The Navajo volcanic field is a monogenetic volcanic field located in the Four Corners region of the United States, in the central part of the Colorado Plateau. The volcanic field consists of over 80 volcanoes and associated intrusions of unusual potassium-rich compositions, with an age range of 26.2 to 24.7 million years (Ma).

In Navajo Nation tradition, the vents are known as tsézhiin ‘íí ‘áhí , "black rocks protruding up", and they play an important role in Navajo creation stories. Geologists have studied the Navajo volcanic field for clues to the geologic history of the Colorado Plateau and the timing and cause of its uplift.

== Volcanology ==
The Navajo volcanic field consists of over 80 volcanoes and associated intrusions. Geologically, these erupted in a short time interval, between 26.2 and 24.7 million years ago, based on high-precision Ar-Ar dating of samples from the field. Most of the vents are maar-diatreme volcanoes, formed when magma came into contact with groundwater with explosive results. At some vents, the diatreme-eruptions excavated the country rock to depths as great as 1,000 meters (3,300 ft) below the original ground surface. Erosion has subsequently removed as much as 1,000 meters (3,300 ft) of overlying rock, exposing the deeper parts of the diatremes. These typically consist of lapilli tuffs and tuff breccias, which are consolidated beds of rock fragments produced by the eruptions (volcaniclastics) the size of coarse sand grains or larger. In a few locations, erosion has been less extensive, and lava flows and the upper parts of maars are still preserved.

The dikes of the field are oriented at random, except for dikes radiating from local eruption centers, such as Shiprock. This indicates that the Colorado Plateau was not experiencing systematic regional stresses at the time the volcanoes of the field were erupting. This in turn suggests that the Colorado Plateau had already separated from the Basin and Range Province and from the High Plains Province along the Rio Grande rift, which were experiencing significant regional stresses. The high potassium content of the magma erupted in the province suggests that potassium-rich fluids from the disintegrating Farallon Plate beneath the Colorado Plateau had risen into the overlying mantle wedge. This resulted in metasomatism (replacement of some minerals in the rock with new minerals of different composition) that lowered the rock density and contributed to the uplift of the Colorado Plateau. Dating of monazite emplaced by the metasomatic fluids supports an age of about 28 million years for the metasomatism.

== Petrology ==
Most of the vents of the Navajo volcanic field erupted minette lamprophyre, an unusual volcanic rock highly enriched in potassium that contains sizable crystals (phenocrysts) of the minerals phlogopite mica, diopside, and sometimes olivine. These are embedded in a very fine-grained matrix of alkali feldspar, diopside, phlogopite, and apatite. The next most common eruptive material is serpentinized ultramafic microbreccia (SUM). This rock consists of xenocrysts and xenoliths embedded in a matrix of minerals typical of serpentine: serpentinite, chlorite, clay minerals, and talc. The xenocrysts (individual crystals entrained by the magma from surrounding rock) are composed of minerals such as olivine, enstatite, chrome diopside, chlorite, garnet, titanclinohumite, various oxide minerals, and apatite. The xenoliths include both mantle and crust compositions. These rocks were originally identified as kimberlites, but in normal kimberlites, the large crystals in the matrix are phenocrysts, formed by solidification out of the magma, rather than xenoliths, entrained in the magma from surrounding solid rock. Normal kimberlites also contain minerals rich in incompatible elements that are not present in the Navajo volcanic field SUMs. The SUMs are thought to have formed through interactions of minette magma with hydrous mantle rock.

Flows and plugs of extrusive trachybasalt in the Chuska and Lukachukai Mountains are chemically equivalent to the minette. Other rare rock types found in a few locations in the Navajo volcanic field include monchiquites (sodium-rich lamprophyres), olivine melilites, and katungite, the latter having a silica content as low as 33.6 percent.

The eruptions brought xenoliths, fragments of mantle rock, to the surface. Geologists have studied these for clues to the nature of the lithosphere under the volcanic field. The xenoliths are mostly spinel peridotite with rarer garnet peridotite. These suggest that the Colorado Plateau has a stable, cold, chemically depleted mantle root similar to those of Archean cratons. Lower crust xenoliths suggest the basement crust of the Colorado Plateau formed 2000 to 1750 million years ago and experienced a prolonged episode of metamorphism and possible underplating (pooling of magma at the base of the crust) starting 1400 million years ago. Xenoliths erupted at The Thumb, a small vent near Shiprock, were mantle rock entrained by the magma at a depth close to 130 kilometers (81 mi) and at a temperature of about 930 to 1,230 °C (1,710 to 2,250 °F). They range from a coarse garnet peridotite, thought to be typical of the mantle rock below this part of the volcanic field, to an extremely coarse rock enriched in iron and titanium and depleted in chromium, thought to have crystallized from a magma intrusion into the mantle. Stable isotope ratios in Navajo volcanic field rocks suggest that the magmas formed by melting of mica- or pyroxene-rich mantle rock, with the melt subsequently interacting with metasomatized mantle peridotite.

== Cultural importance ==
The Navajo people refer to the outcrops of the Navajo volcanic field as tsézhiin ‘íí ‘áhí, "black rocks protruding up", and they play an important role in Navajo creation stories. Navajo ethnogeology revolving around the tsézhiin ‘íí ‘áhí has been used to enhance scientific education in Navajo Nation educational institutions.

The Chacoan civilization included vents of the Navajo volcanic field, such as Shiprock, Bennett Peak, and Ford Butte, in their system of sacred geography.

== Notable vents ==
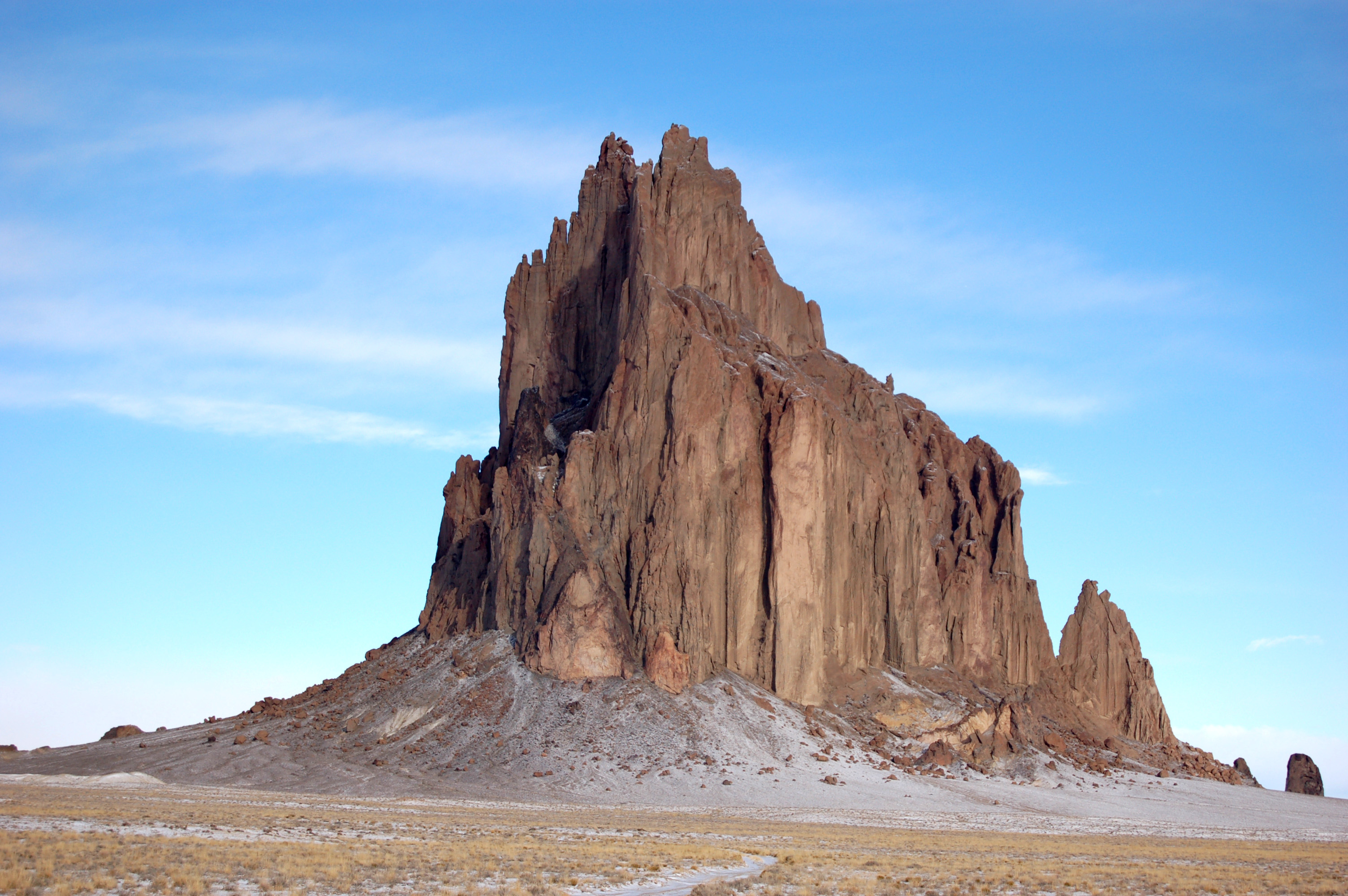
Shiprock, a volcanic neck of the Navajo volcanic field

| Name | Elevation | Coordinates | Age |
| Agathla Peak | 7,099 feet (2,164 m) | 36°49′34″N 110°13′31″W | - |
| Barber Peak | 5,778 feet (1,761 m) | 36°35′14″N 108°41′47″W | |
| Bennett Peak | 6,471 feet (1,972 m) | 36°22′35″N 108°44′22″W | |
| Cathedral Cliff | 5,810 feet (1,770 m) | 36°36′29″N 108°42′26″W | |
| Chaistla Butte | 6,098 feet (1,859 m) | 36°46′51″N 110°12′26″W | |
| Ford Butte | 6,156 feet (1,876 m) | 36°23′03″N 108°42′28″W | - |
| Mitten Rock | 6,557 feet (1,999 m) | 36°36′33″N 108°56′40″W | - |
| Shiprock | 7,177 feet (2,188 m) | 36°41′15″N 108°50′11″W | 24.4 Ma |

== See also ==
- List of volcanoes in the United States
- List of volcanic fields
