= Owl Rock =

Landform in Navajo County, Arizona

- Bee 'Adizí
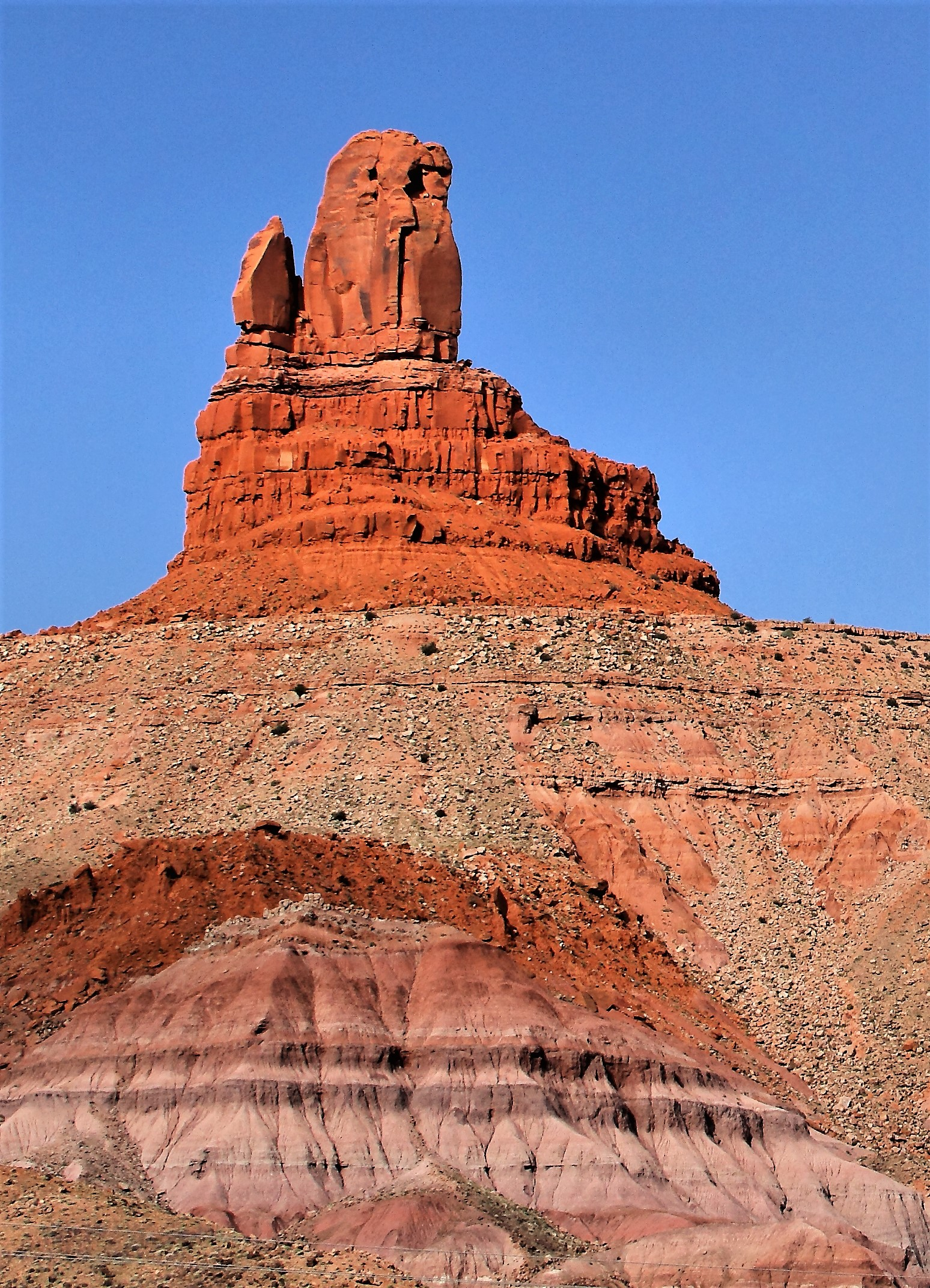
- East aspect

Highest point
- Elevation: 6,547 ft (1,996 m)
- Prominence: 387 ft (118 m)
- Parent peak: Agathla Peak (7,099 ft)
- Isolation: 1.40 mi (2.25 km)
- Coordinates: 36°49′14″N 110°14′59″W

Geography
- Location within Arizona Location within the United States
- Location: Navajo Reservation; Navajo County, Arizona, U.S.
- Parent range: Colorado Plateau
- Topo map: USGS Agathla Peak

Geology
- Rock age(s): Jurassic, Upper Triassic
- Rock type: Wingate Sandstone

Climbing
- First ascent: 1966 Fred Beckey, Harvey Carter
- Easiest route: class 5.x climbing

Owl Rock is a 6,547-foot (1,996 m) elevation sandstone summit located south of Monument Valley, in northeast Arizona. It is situated 7 miles (11 km) north of Kayenta on Navajo Nation land, and can be seen from Highway 163 perched on the east edge of Tyende Mesa, where it towers 1,000 feet (300 meters) above the surrounding terrain. Its nearest higher neighbor is Agathla Peak, 1.4 miles (2.3 km) to the east-northeast, on the opposite side of this highway. Precipitation runoff from this feature drains into El Capitan Wash, which is part of the San Juan River drainage basin. The first ascent of Owl Rock was made in April 1966 by Fred Beckey and Harvey Carter by climbing cracks on the west face, and then bolting up a smooth south nose to the summit. They employed 20 pitons and 14 bolts on this route called Warpath. The descriptive name stems from its uncanny resemblance to an owl when viewed from the east. This feature is known as Bee 'Adizí in Navajo language meaning "spindle", and this sacred place is considered to be a spindle left behind by the Holy People. A newer name for it is Tsé Ts'óózí, meaning "Slim Rock".

This Owl Rock is not to be confused with another located in Arches National Park in Utah.

== Geology ==
Owl Rock is a red spire composed of Jurassic Wingate Sandstone which is a hard, fine-grained rock which is great for rock climbing, in contrast to the towers and buttes in nearby Monument Valley which have a different composition, de Chelly sandstone. Owl Rock stands atop Tyende Mesa which is formed of the Triassic Chinle Formation. The Owl Rock Member of the Chinle Formation, composed of cherty limestone and limestone conglomerate beds alternating with claystone, mudstone, and siltstone beds, forms the upper half of the mesa, and it overlays the Petrified Forest Member of the lower half. The Owl Rock Member is best exposed at its type locality near the base of Owl Rock. Here the member crops out and the resistant limestone beds form a series of jutting ledges that serve partly in protecting the underlying strata. The limestone beds are very resistant to erosion, forming thin ledges interrupting the slopes weathered from the dominant siltstone interbeds. The Owl Rock Member ranges in thickness from approximately 120 to 166 feet, and at Owl Rock the member is 166 feet thick.

== Climate ==
Spring and fall are the most favorable seasons to visit Owl Rock. According to the Köppen climate classification system, it is located in a semi-arid climate zone with cold winters and hot summers. Summers average 54 days above 90 °F (32 °C) annually, and highs rarely exceed 100 °F (38 °C). Summer nights are comfortably cool, and temperatures drop quickly after sunset. Winters are cold, but daytime highs are usually above freezing. Winter temperatures below 0 °F (−18 °C) are uncommon, though possible. This desert climate receives less than 10 inches (250 millimeters) of annual rainfall, and snowfall is generally light during the winter.

== Gallery ==
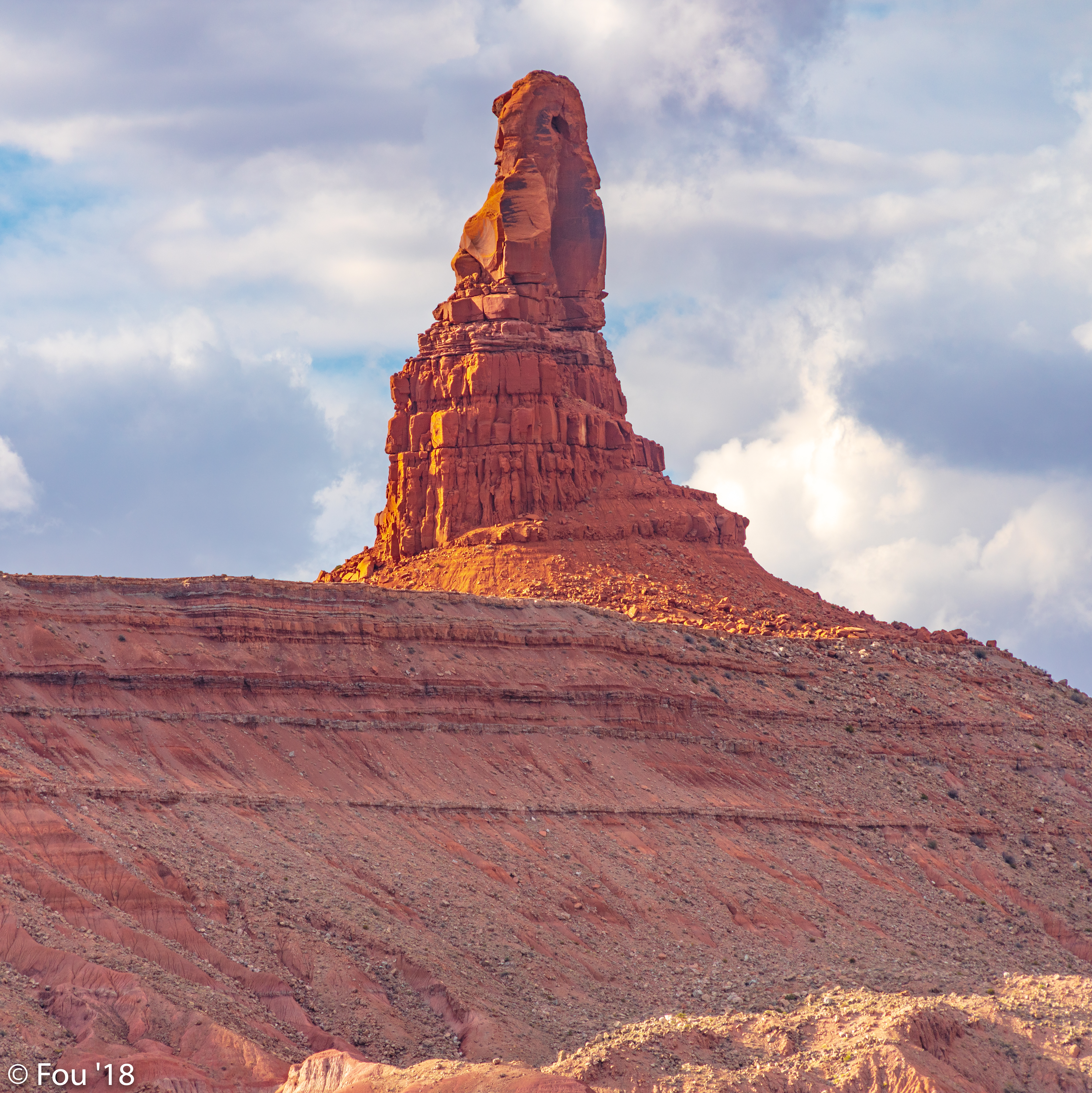
Profile view, from southeast

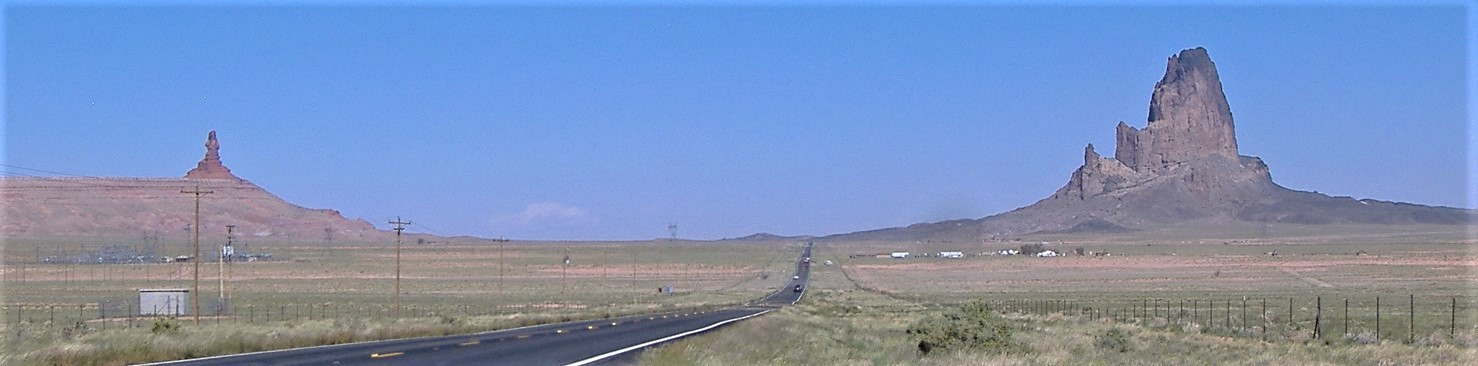
Owl Rock (left), Highway 163, Agathla Peak from the south

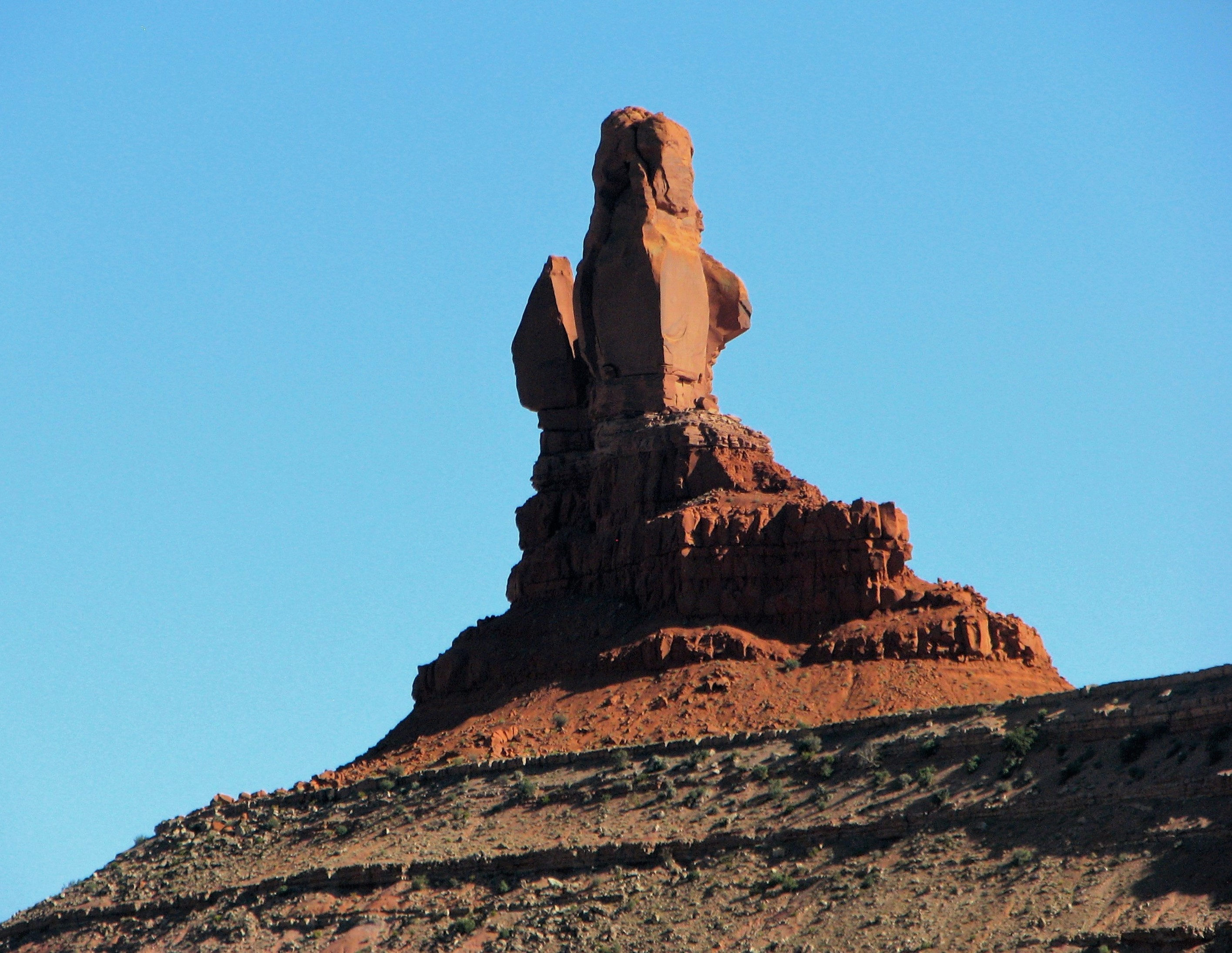
Northeast aspect

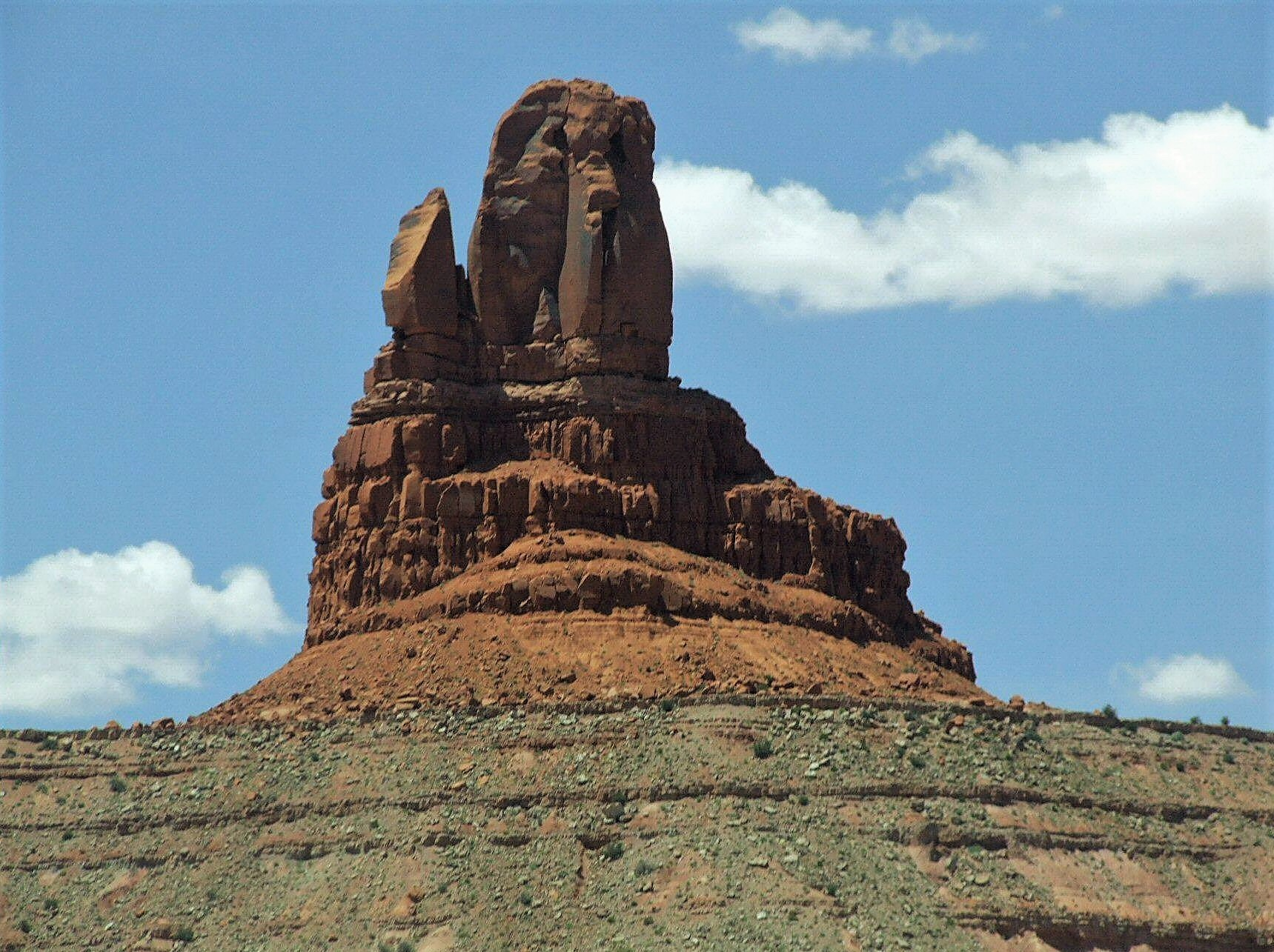

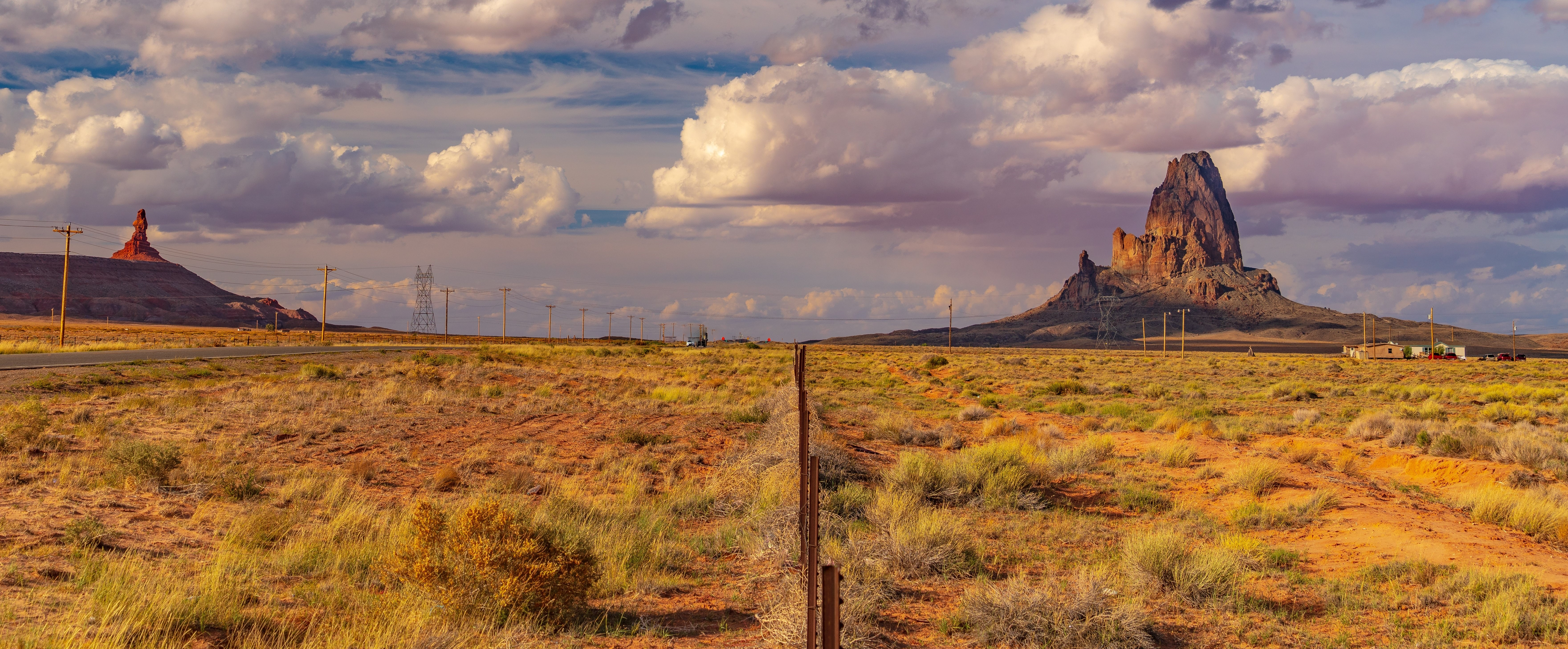
Looking north with Owl Rock on left

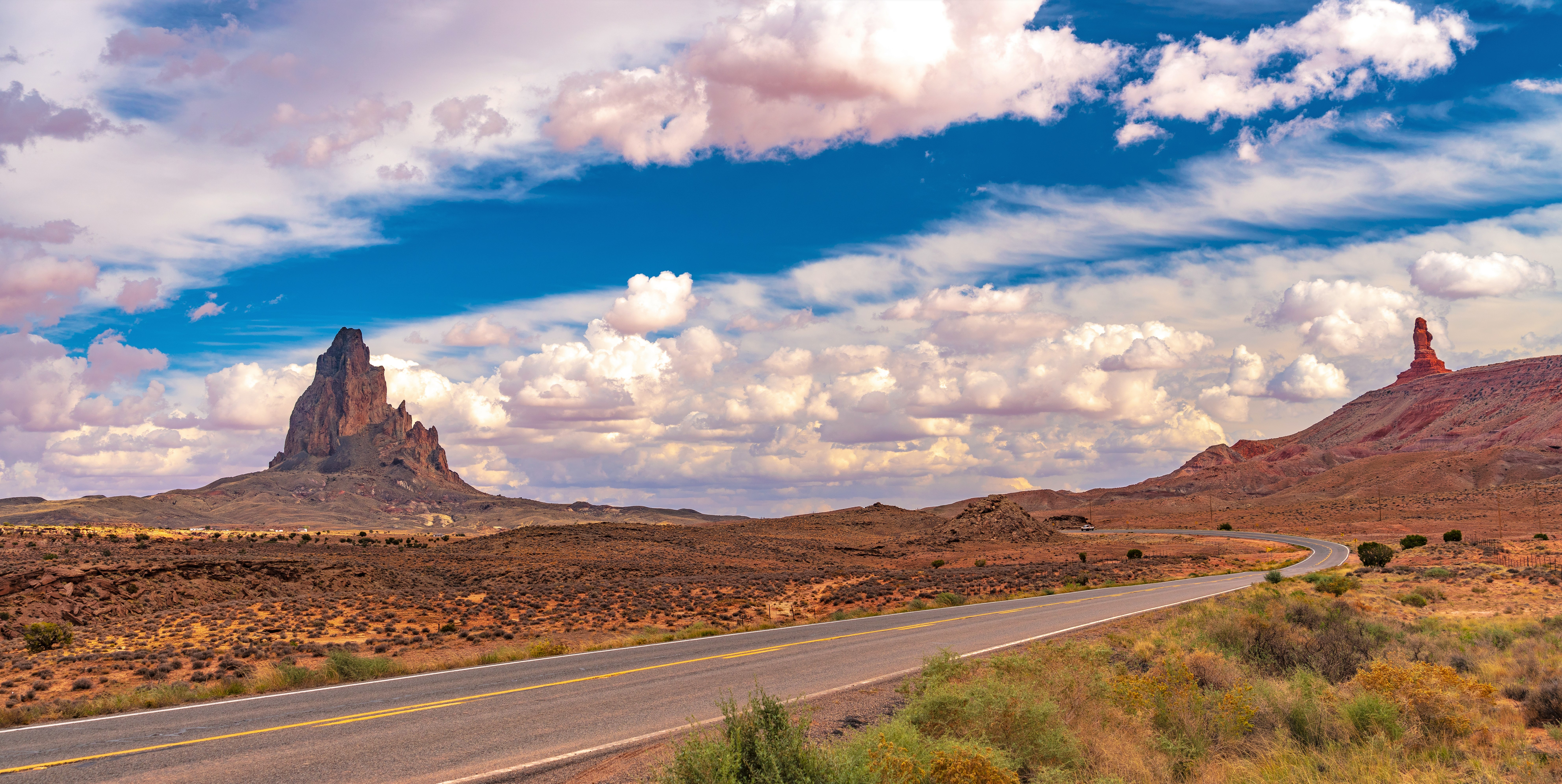
Looking south with Owl Rock on right

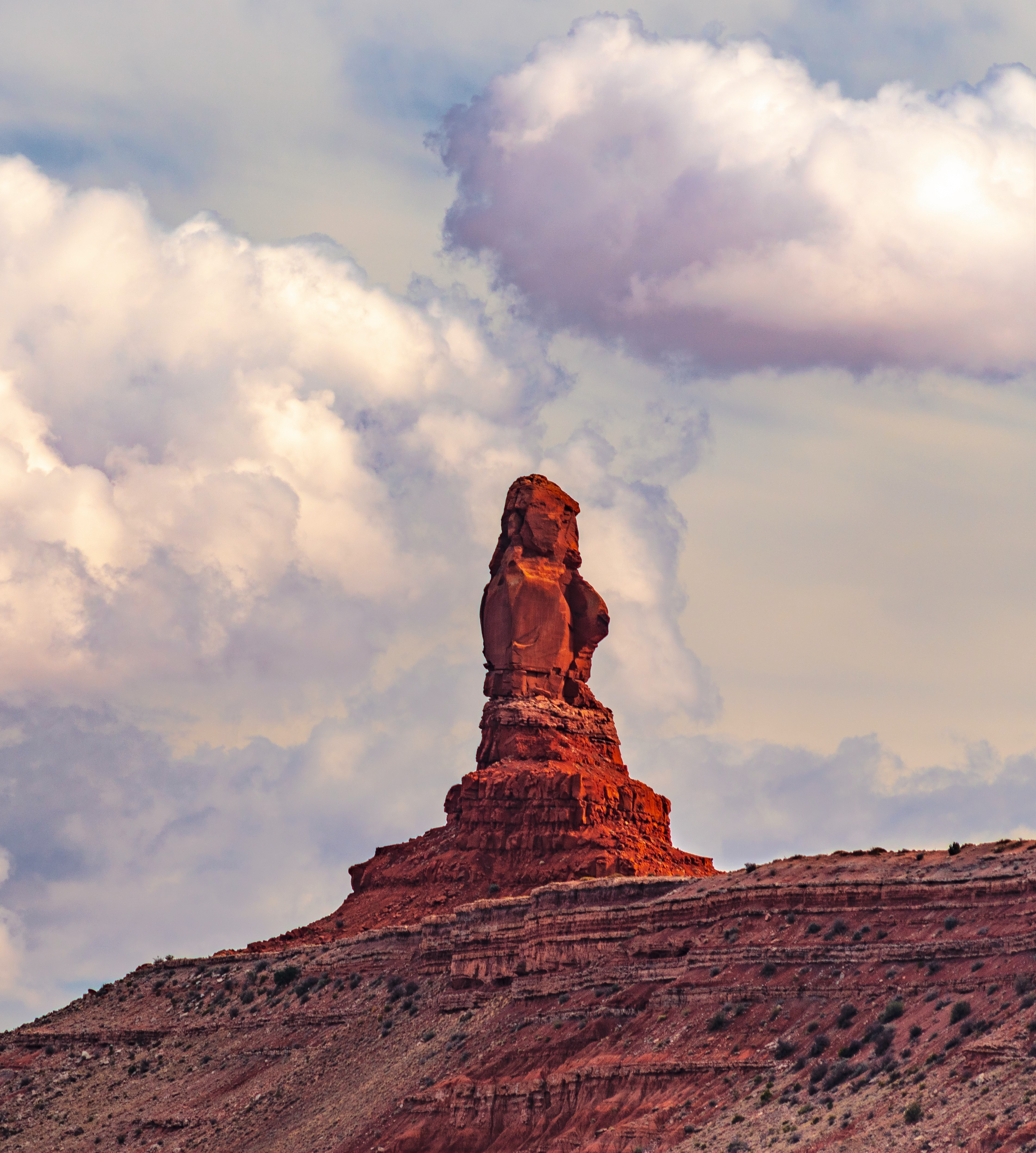

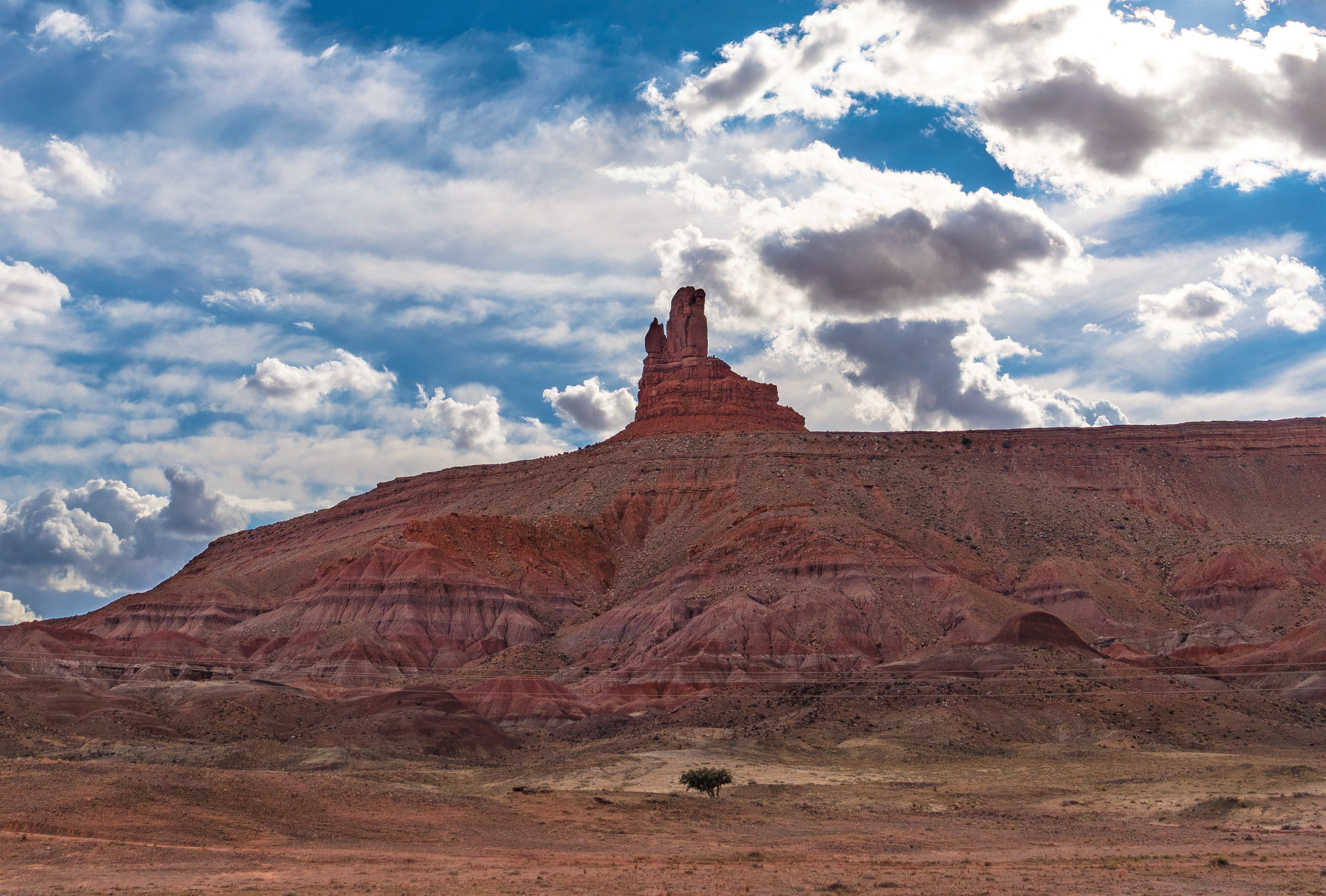

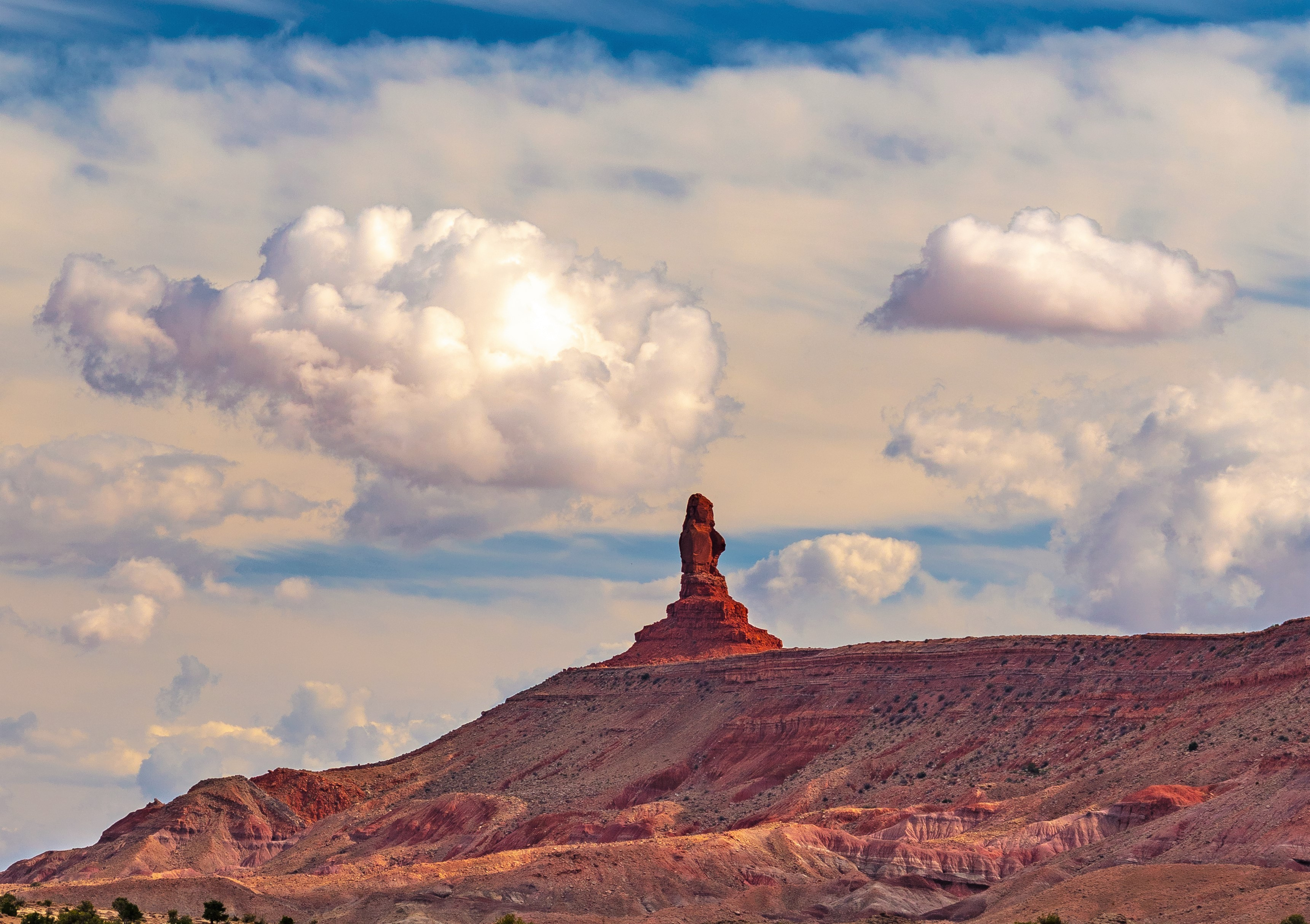

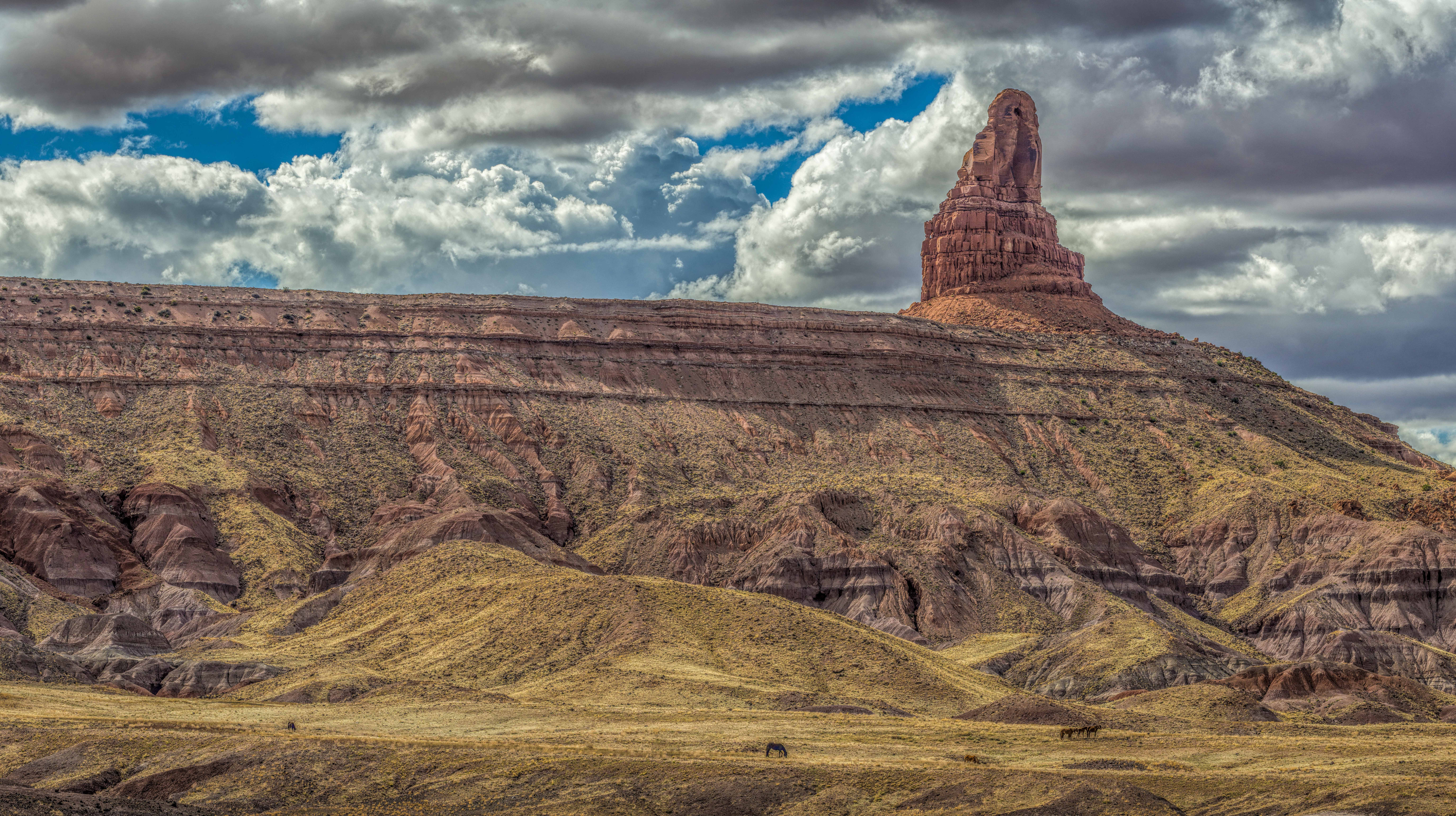

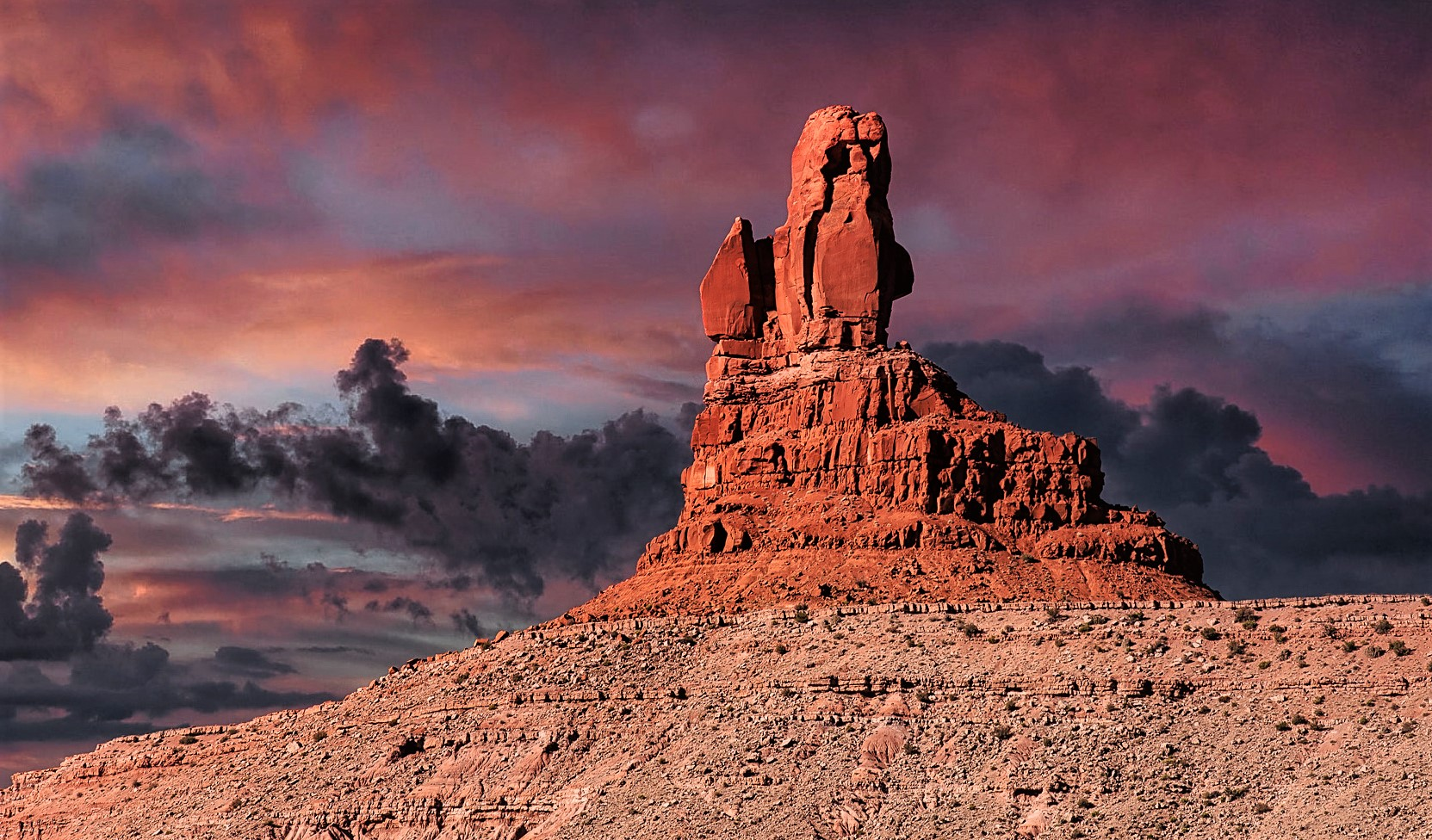

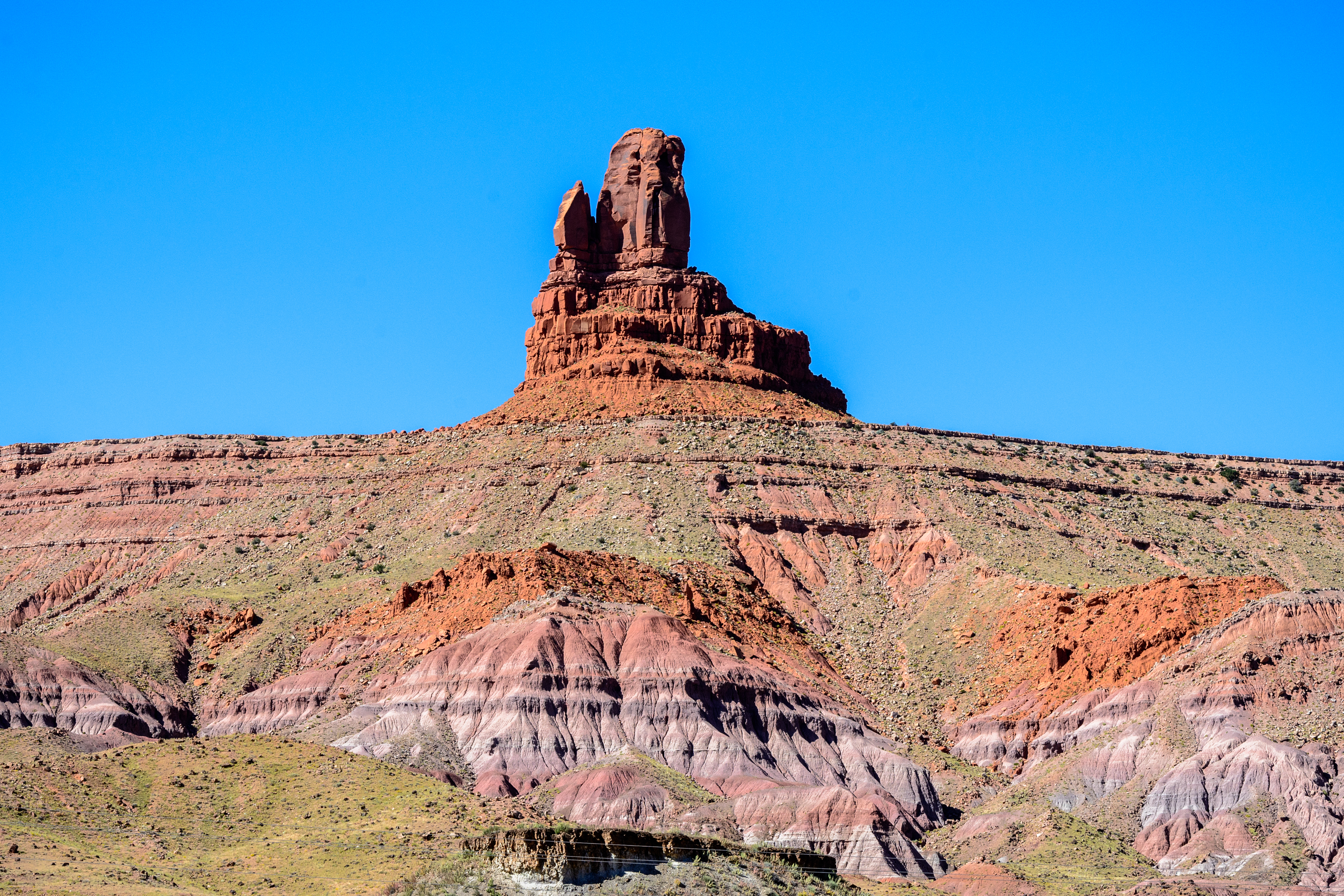

== See also ==
- Colorado Plateau
- List of rock formations in the United States
