= Shiprock =

Monadnock in San Juan County, New Mexico

- Tsé Bitʼaʼí
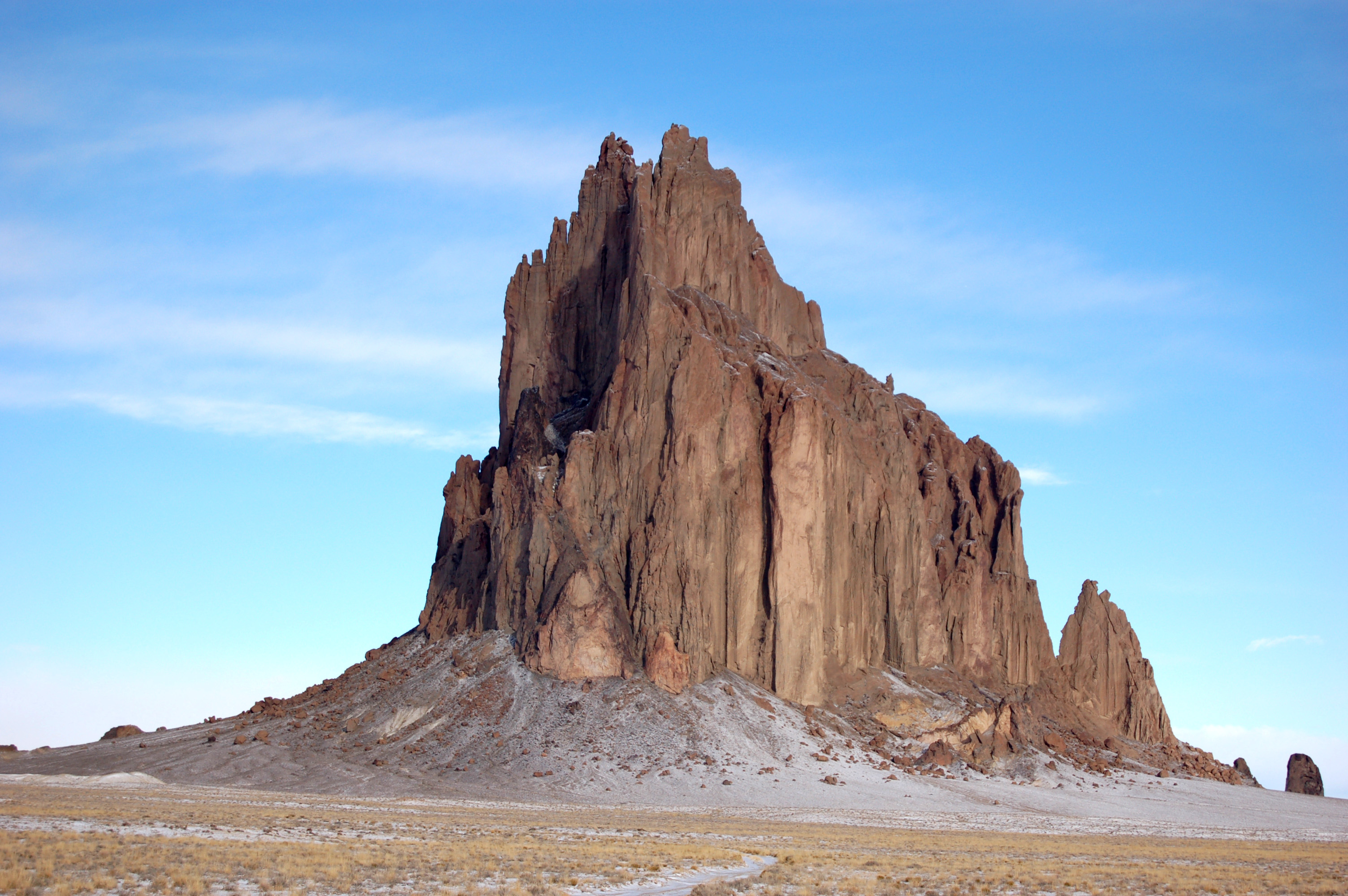
- Shiprock

Highest point
- Elevation: 7,177 ft (2,188 m)
- Prominence: 1,583 ft (482 m)
- Coordinates: 36°41′15″N 108°50′11″W

Geography
- Location within New Mexico
- Location: San Juan County, New Mexico, US
- Topo map: USGS Ship Rock Quadrangle

Geology
- Rock age: 27 million years
- Mountain type(s): Volcanic breccia and minette

Climbing
- First ascent: (First documented) 1939 by David Brower, Raffi Bedayn, Bestor Robinson and John Dyer

U.S. National Natural Landmark
- Designated: 1975

Shiprock (Navajo: Tsé Bitʼaʼí, "rock with wings" or "winged rock") is a monadnock rising nearly 1,583 feet (482 m) above the high-desert plain of the Navajo Nation in San Juan County, New Mexico, United States. Its peak elevation is 7,177 feet (2,188 m) above sea level. It is 10.75 miles (17.30 km) southwest of the town of Shiprock, which is named for the peak.

Governed by the Navajo Nation, the formation is in the Four Corners region and plays a significant role in Navajo religion, myth, and tradition. Shiprock is a point of interest for rock climbers and photographers and has been featured in several film productions and novels. It is the most prominent landmark in northwestern New Mexico. In 1975, Shiprock was designated a National Natural Landmark by the National Park Service.

== Name ==
The Navajo name for the peak, Tsé Bitʼaʼí, "rock with wings" or "winged rock", refers to the legend of the great bird that brought the Navajo from the north to their present lands. The name "Shiprock" or Shiprock Peak or Ship Rock derives from the peak's resemblance to an enormous 19th-century clipper ship. Americans first called the peak "The Needle", a name given to the topmost pinnacle by Captain J. F. McComb in 1860. United States Geological Survey maps indicate that the name "Ship Rock" dates from the 1870s.

== Geology ==
Shiprock, an example of a volcanic neck, is composed of fractured volcanic breccia and black dikes of igneous rock called minette, a type of lamprophyre. It is the erosional remnant of the throat of a volcano, and the volcanic breccia formed in a diatreme. The rock was probably originally formed 2,500–3,000 feet (750–1,000 meters) below the Earth's surface, but it was exposed after millions of years of erosion. Wall-like sheets of minette, known as dikes, radiate away from the central formation. Radiometric age determinations of the minette establish that these volcanic rocks solidified about 27 million years ago. Shiprock is in the northeastern part of the Navajo volcanic field—a field that includes intrusions and flows of minette and other unusual igneous rocks that formed about 30 million years ago. Agathla (El Capitan) in Monument Valley is another prominent volcanic neck in this volcanic field.

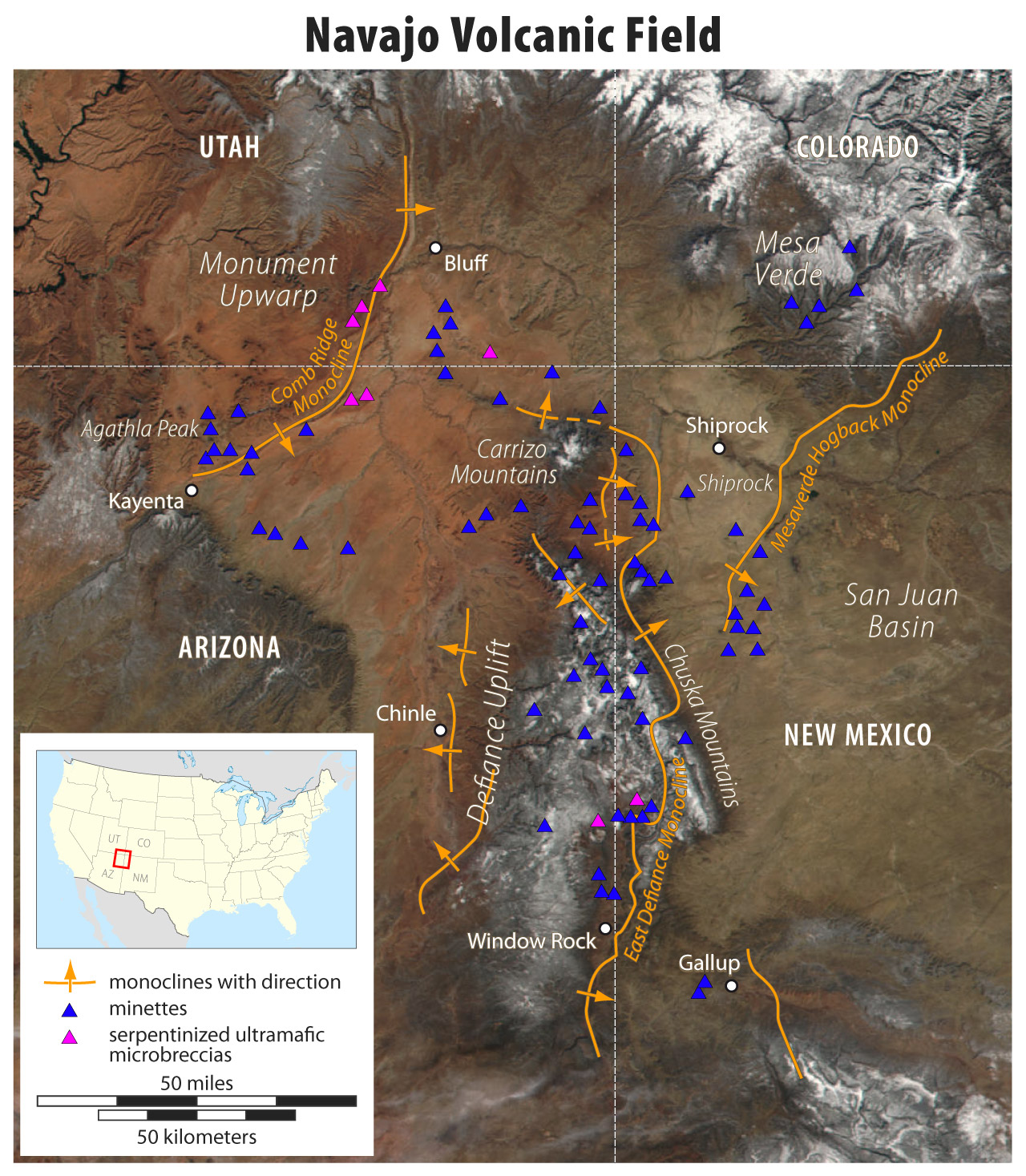
Map of Navajo Volcanic Field with Shiprock

== Climbing history and legal status ==
The recorded first ascent was in 1939, by a Sierra Club party including David Brower, Raffi Bedayn, Bestor Robinson and John Dyer. This was the first climb in the United States to use expansion bolts for protection. Pitons were used for direct aid. This first ascent route is featured in the 1979 book Fifty Classic Climbs of North America.

Since then, at least seven routes have been climbed on the peak, all of them of great technical difficulty. A modification of the original route is recorded as the easiest. It is rated as Grade IV, YDS 5.9, A1. It was considered a great unsolved problem by the climbing community in the 1920s and 1930s. At that time, there was a widespread rumor of a $1000 prize for climbing the peak, which inspired "dozens of attempts by the experienced and inexperienced alike".

The idea of climbing Shiprock is repugnant to many Navajo people. Climbing has been illegal since 1970. In spite of this, rock climbers continue to see Shiprock as an interesting place to climb.

Serious injuries to three climbers in March 1970 caused the Navajo Nation to ban rock climbing not only on Shiprock but all over the Navajo Nation on monoliths, spires, and within tribal parks under the jurisdiction of Navajo Parks & Recreation. The Navajo Nation announced that the ban was "absolute, final and unconditional".

According to reports from the Navajo Parks and Recreation Department, which administers recreational activities on Navajo land, there have been false claims that the department allows rock climbing and cooperates with rock climbing organizations. A 2006 press release addressing Monument Valley, another area of monoliths within the Navajo Nation, states:

Reports of the Navajo Parks and Recreation Department allowing rock climbing are false. Yet several websites have postings on how to evade Navajo Nation regulations and proceed with dangerous and illegal rock climbs in [Monument Valley]. Even more serious than the possible physical harm illegal climbs could pose is the religious damage done to the Navajo people by these non-Navajo visitors. The Monuments are sacred to the Navajo people, and any human interaction (by Navajo or non-Navajo) is strictly off limits. Please abide by the humble religious requests of the Navajo people and do not climb the Monuments. 'Navajo law will be strictly enforced on this issue,' Parks Department Manager Ray Russell also added.

Permits are issued by the department to camp and hike in some areas, but not for sacred monuments such as Shiprock.

== Religious and cultural significance ==
Shiprock and the surrounding land have religious and historical significance to the Navajo people. It is mentioned in many of their myths and legends. Foremost is the peak's role as the agent that brought the Navajo to the southwest. According to one legend, after being transported from another place, the Navajos lived on the monolith, "coming down only to plant their fields and get water." One day, the peak was struck by lightning, obliterating the trail and leaving only a sheer cliff, and stranding the women and children on top to starve. The presence of people on the peak is forbidden "for fear they might stir up the chį́įdii (ghosts), or rob their corpses."

Navajo legend puts the peak in a larger geographic context. Shiprock is said to be either a medicine pouch or a bow carried by the "Goods of Value Mountain", a large mythic male figure comprising several mountain features throughout the region. The Chuska Mountains comprise the body, Chuska Peak is the head, the Carrizo Mountains are the legs, and Beautiful Mountain is the feet.

Navajo legend has it that Bird Monsters (Tsé Ninájálééh) nested on the peak and fed on human flesh. After Monster Slayer, elder of the Warrior Twins, destroyed Déélééd at Red Mesa, he killed two adult Bird Monsters at Shiprock and changed two young ones into an eagle and an owl. The peak is mentioned in stories from the Enemy Side Ceremony and the Navajo Mountain Chant, and is associated with the Bead Chant and the Naayee'ee Ceremony.

== Climate ==
Climate data for Shiprock, NM
Month	Jan	Feb	Mar	Apr	May	Jun	Jul	Aug	Sep	Oct	Nov	Dec	Year
Record high °F (°C)	66 (19)	78 (26)	83 (28)	91 (33)	99 (37)	107 (42)	109 (43)	106 (41)	99 (37)	92 (33)	78 (26)	72 (22)	109 (43)
Mean daily maximum °F (°C)	43.0 (6.1)	50.6 (10.3)	59.9 (15.5)	70.0 (21.1)	79.8 (26.6)	90.1 (32.3)	94.6 (34.8)	91.9 (33.3)	85.1 (29.5)	72.4 (22.4)	56.2 (13.4)	44.1 (6.7)	69.8 (21.0)
Mean daily minimum °F (°C)	15.7 (−9.1)	21.5 (−5.8)	27.5 (−2.5)	34.9 (1.6)	43.8 (6.6)	51.2 (10.7)	58.8 (14.9)	57.3 (14.1)	48.0 (8.9)	36.0 (2.2)	25.1 (−3.8)	16.9 (−8.4)	36.4 (2.5)
Record low °F (°C)	−18 (−28)	−14 (−26)	2 (−17)	9 (−13)	15 (−9)	28 (−2)	30 (−1)	33 (1)	21 (−6)	10 (−12)	0 (−18)	−26 (−32)	−26 (−32)
Average precipitation inches (mm)	0.46 (12)	0.46 (12)	0.54 (14)	0.41 (10)	0.51 (13)	0.29 (7.4)	0.66 (17)	1.00 (25)	0.80 (20)	0.78 (20)	0.52 (13)	0.57 (14)	7 (177.4)
Average snowfall inches (cm)	1.6 (4.1)	0.7 (1.8)	0.6 (1.5)	0 (0)	0 (0)	0 (0)	0 (0)	0 (0)	0 (0)	0 (0)	0.2 (0.51)	1.0 (2.5)	4.1 (10.41)
Source: http://www.wrcc.dri.edu/cgi-bin/cliMAIN.pl?nm8284

== Gallery ==
Shiprock
Aerial view of Shiprock in true color

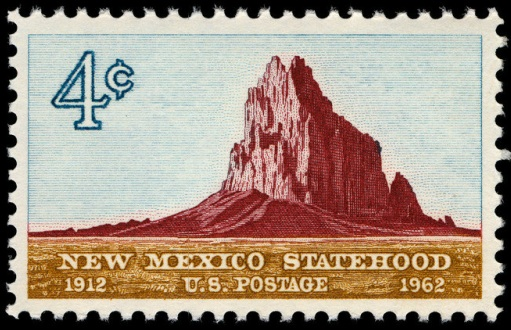
Shiprock on a 1962 U.S. commemorative stamp

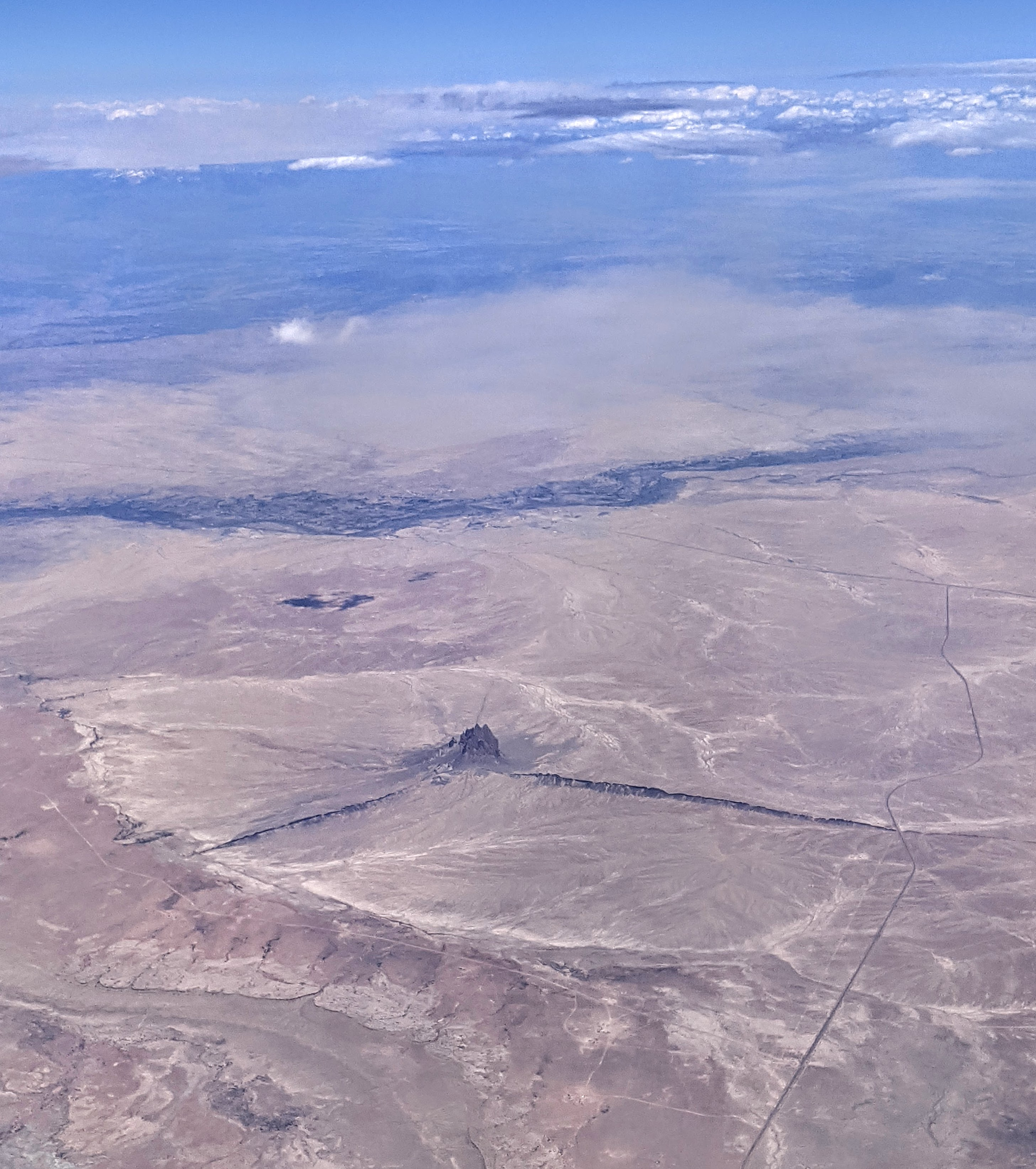
Aerial view of Shiprock and Shiprock Dike, with the San Juan River behind

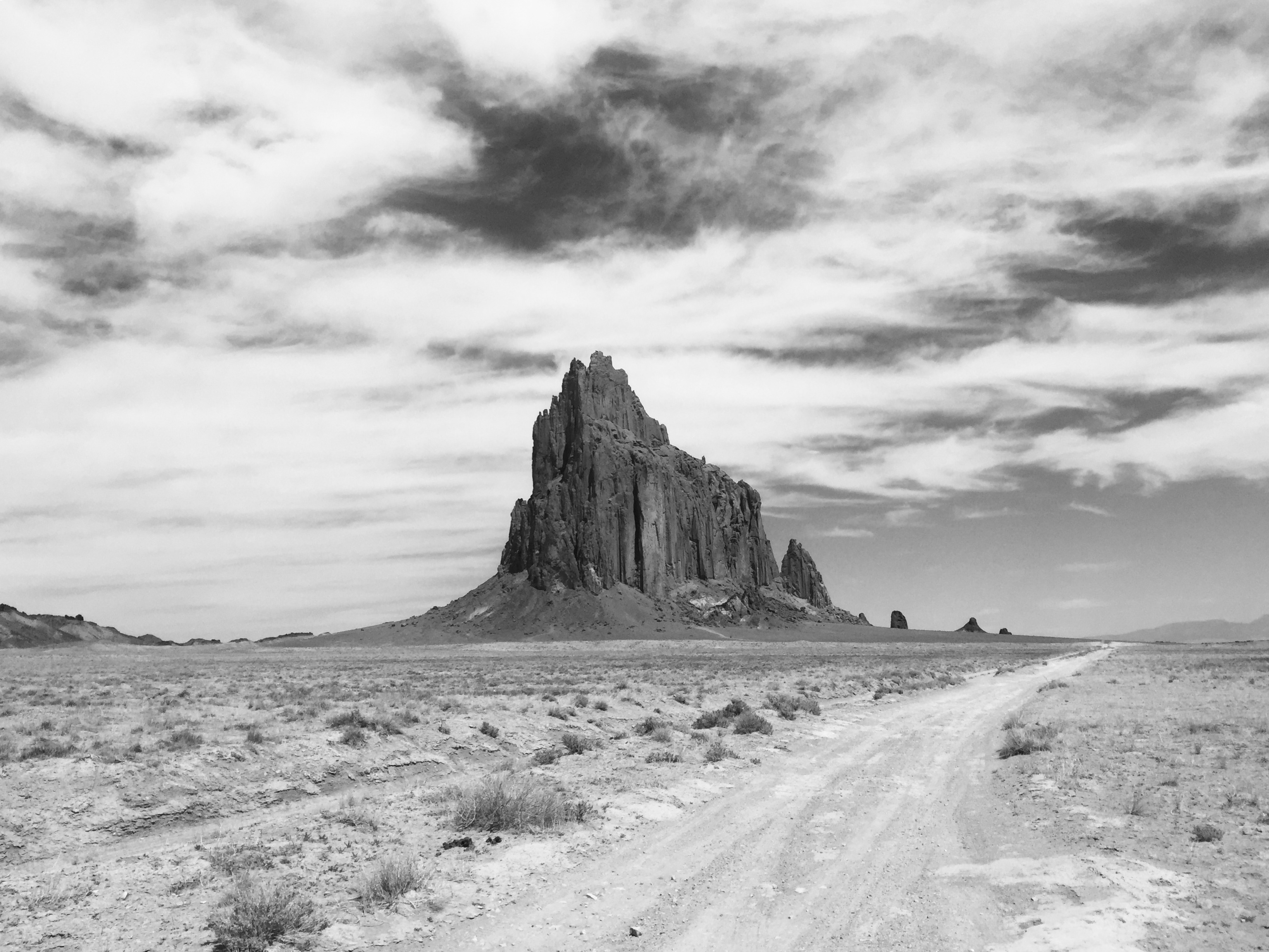
Shiprock monochrome image (2021)

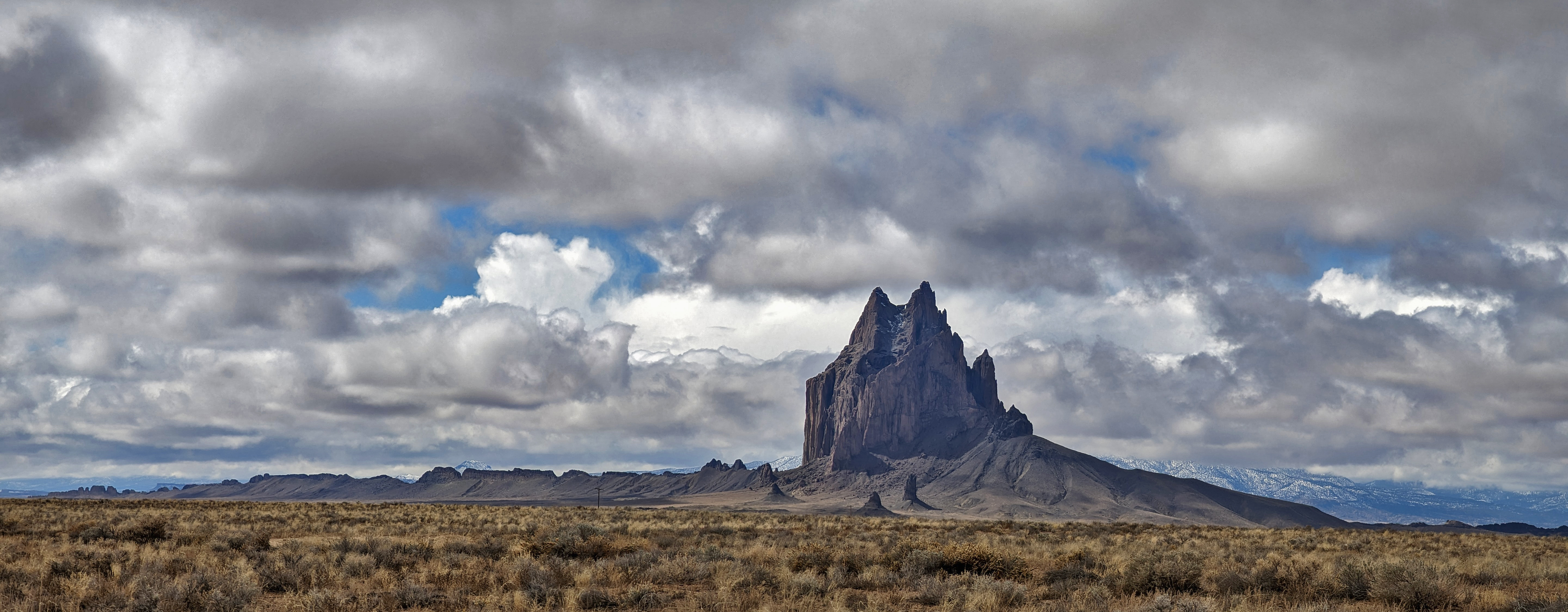
Shiprock formation in New Mexico, USA, showing the 5-mile-long dike radiating to the south.

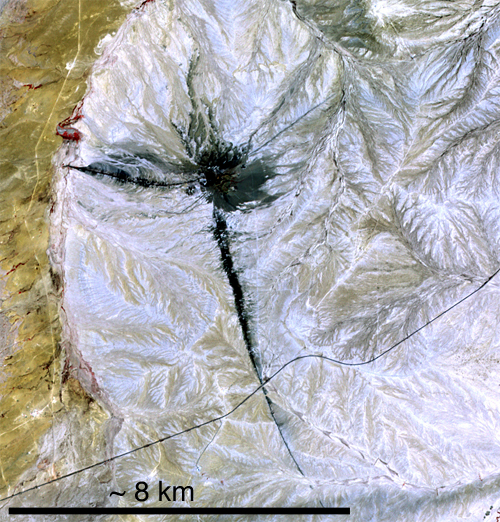
Shiprock and associated dikes taken by NASA in 2006 with the Terra satellite. The colors shown represent infrared wavelengths: Lush vegetation appears bright red, while different kinds of rock with less vegetation appear in shades of gray, black, and tan.

== See also ==
- Diné Bahaneʼ
- Cabezon Peak
- Devils Tower
- Elephant Butte
- Rock formations in the United States
- Volcanic plug
