= Gordon Bennett =

Gordon Bennett may refer to:

== People ==
- Gordon Bennett (artist) (1955–2014), Australian artist
- Gordon Bennett (football executive) (died 2020), English football manager
- Gordon Bennett (general) (1887–1962), Australian soldier
- Gordon Bennett (union organiser) (1944–1991), Christmas Island labor advocate
- Gordon Dunlap Bennett (born 1946), American Catholic bishop
- Gordon Lockhart Bennett (1912–2000), Canadian politician
- James Gordon Bennett Sr. (1795–1872), American editor and New York Herald founder
  - James Gordon Bennett Jr. (1841–1918), his son, American publisher and sportsman

== Other uses ==
- Gordon Bennett (comics), a British comic book character
- Gordon Bennett (phrase), an English idiomatic phrase, after James Gordon Bennett Jr.
- "Gordon Bennett", a song by Gilbert O'Sullivan from the 1989 album In the Key of G

== See also ==
- Gordon Bennett Cup (disambiguation)
- Gordon Bennetts (1909–1987), Australian cricketer
