= Bennett Peak (disambiguation) =

Bennett Peak is a mountain summit in the San Juan range of the Rocky Mountains in southwestern Colorado.

Bennett Peak may also refer to:

- Bennett Mountain, California
- Bennett Peak (New Mexico)
- Bennett Peak (British Columbia)
- Mount Bennett, Antarctica
