= Gordon Bennett Cup =

Gordon Bennett Cup may refer to:

- Gordon Bennett Cup (auto racing)
- Gordon Bennett Cup (ballooning), a gas balloon race

== See also ==
- Gordon Bennett Trophy (aeroplanes), in the sport of air racing
- James Gordon Bennett Jr. (1841–1918)
- Gordon Bennett (disambiguation)
