= Gordon Bennett (phrase) =

English idiomatic phrase

"Gordon Bennett" is an English-language idiomatic phrase used to express surprise, contempt, outrage, disgust, frustration or exasperation.

== Background ==
The expression is thought to derive either from the controversial reputation of James Gordon Bennett Jr. (1841–1918), son of British-born James Gordon Bennett Sr., founder and publisher of the New York Herald, or as a minced oath, "perhaps a euphemistic substitution for gorblimey". Bennett Jr. was an accomplished polo player, tennis player and yachtsman. There was also an Australian general of the same name from World War II, but any link there is ruled out by an earlier 1937 quotation of the interjection.
