= Gordon Bennett Cup (auto racing) =

Auto racing competition from 1900 to 1905

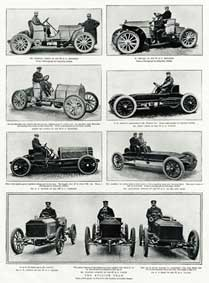
Magazine spread showing three Gordon Bennett Cup Teams in 1903: German Mercedes (top), USA Wintons and Peerless (middle) and British Napiers (bottom)

In automobile racing, the Gordon Bennett Cup was an annual competition which ran from 1900 to 1905. It was one of three Gordon Bennett Cups established by James Gordon Bennett, Jr., millionaire owner of the New York Herald.

In 1899, Gordon Bennett offered the Automobile Club de France (ACF) a trophy to be raced for annually by the automobile clubs of the various countries. The competition was held until 1905, after which the ACF held the first Grand Prix motor racing event at a road course near Le Mans.

The 1903 event in Athy, Co. Kildare, Ireland gave rise to the birth of British Racing Green.

== The Cup ==
The trophy given to the winner was a sculpture of a Panhard racing car driven by the Genius of Progress with the Goddess of Victory as passenger.

== Rules ==
Competition was intended to be between national automobile clubs, or nations, and not individuals. The first contestants were France, Great Britain, the United States, Germany, Austria, Switzerland, Belgium, and Italy. Each club was required to pay a Fr3000 entry fee. Each could send up to three cars; drivers had to be members of the entrant club.

A race, once scheduled, had to be held between 15 May and 15 August, with a total distance of between 550 and 650 km (340 and 400 mi). Participating clubs shared the cost of running the event.

The cars themselves had to have two seats, side by side, with driver and riding mechanic (who were to weigh no less than 60 kg (132 lb) each). Cars were to weigh at least 400 kg (882 lb) empty, and had to be built entirely in the country under whose colours they ran.

== Gordon Bennett races ==
The Gordon Bennett Cup auto races drew entrants from across Europe, including future aviator Henry Farman, and competitors from the United States such as Alexander Winton driving his Winton automobile. Under the rules, the races were hosted in the country of the previous year's winner. As the races were between national teams, it led to the reorganisation and standardisation of national racing colours. Count Eliot Zborowski, father of inter-war racing legend Louis Zborowski, suggested that each national entrant be allotted a different colour. Britain had to choose a different colour from its usual national colours of red, white and blue, as these had already been taken by USA, Germany, and France respectively.

Reputedly as a concession to Ireland where the 1903 Gordon Bennett Cup race was run (racing was illegal on British public roads), the British adopted shamrock green which became known as British racing green, although the winning Napier of 1902 had already been painted olive green, and green was well-established as an appropriate colour for locomotives and machinery, in which Britain had led the world during the previous century.

=== 1900 Gordon Bennett Cup ===
The international motor car race from Paris to Lyons for the Gordon Bennett Cup took place on 14 June 1900. The start from Paris was made at 3 o'clock in the morning and Charron was the first to reach Lyons, arriving at 12:23 p.m. M. Girardot finished second at 2 o'clock.

=== 1901 Gordon Bennett Cup ===
In 1901 the Gordon Bennett Cup race was run in conjunction with the Paris-Bordeaux race on 29 May over a distance of 527.1 km. The race was won by Henri Fournier driving a Mors with a time of 6h 10m 44s. The first of the Gordon Bennett Cup contestants was Leonce Girardot, driving a Panhard with a time of 8h 50m 59s.

=== 1902 Gordon Bennett Cup ===
The 1902 Gordon Bennett Cup was run over a distance of 565 km from Paris to Innsbruck in conjunction with the Paris-Vienna motor car race. The race started in Paris on 26 June. Competing were 30 heavy cars, 48 light cars, six voiturettes, three motorcycles, and three motorcyclettes. Each nation was allowed to nominate up to three cars to compete for the Gordon Bennett Cup, but only six entries were received, three French and three British. The Automobile Club of Great Britain announced that car No. 160 driven by Mr White, and car No. 45, made by Napier & Son of London with Dunlop tyres, driven by Mr Edge would represent the club. The Times announced on June 30 that Edge had won the Gordon Bennett Cup. It was announced in Vienna on 1 July that M. Marcel Renault had won the Paris-Vienna race, with M. Henri Farman second.

=== 1903 Gordon Bennett Cup ===
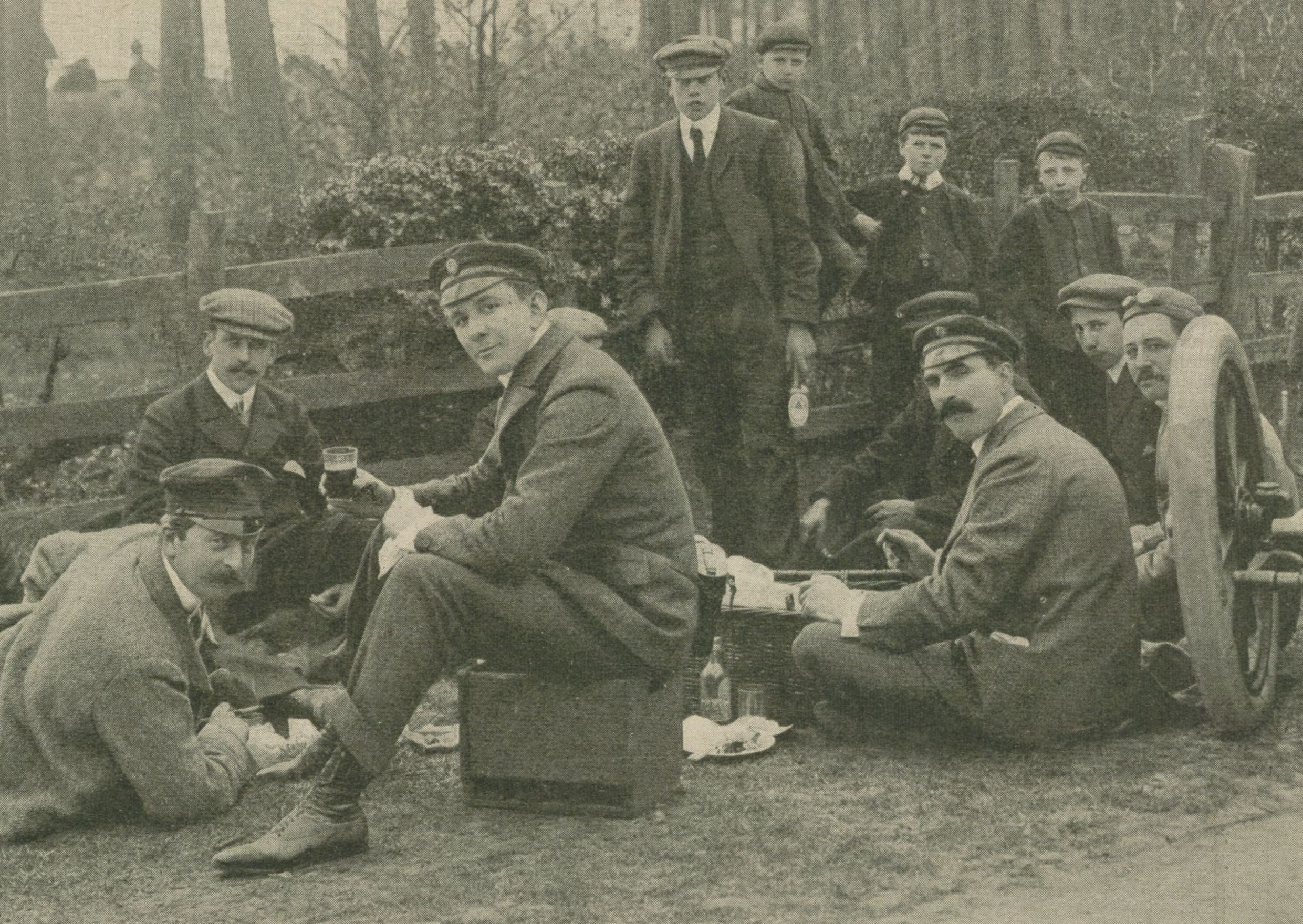
English team -on Napier- before 1903 Gordon Bennett Trophy (l. to r. J.W. Stocks, Ch. Jarrott and S.F. Edge).

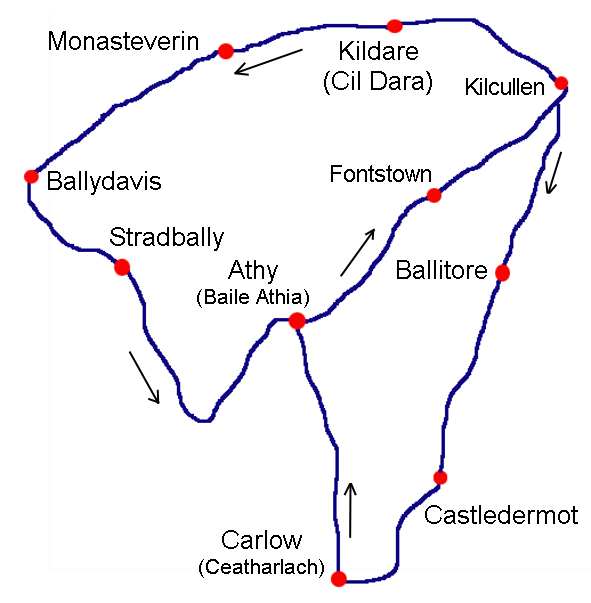
Circuit map for the 1903 Gordon Bennett Trophy

On Thursday, 2 July 1903 the Gordon Bennett Cup was the first international motor race to be held in Ireland, an honorific to Selwyn Edge who had won the 1902 event in the Paris-Vienna race driving a Napier. The Automobile Club of Great Britain and Ireland wanted the race to be hosted in the British Isles, and their secretary, Claude Johnson, suggested Ireland as the venue because racing was illegal on British public roads. The editor of the Dublin Motor News, Richard J. Mecredy, suggested an area in County Kildare, and letters were sent to 102 Irish MPs, 90 Irish peers, 300 newspapers, 34 chairmen of county and local councils, 34 County secretaries, 26 mayors, 41 railway companies, 460 hoteliers, 13 PPs, plus the Bishop of Kildare and Leighlin, Patrick Foley, who pronounced himself in favour. Local laws had to be adjusted, ergo the 'Light Locomotives (Ireland) Bill' was passed on 27 March 1903. Kildare and other local councils drew attention to their areas, whilst Queen's County declared That every facility will be given and the roads placed at the disposal of motorists during the proposed race. Eventually Kildare was chosen, partly on the grounds that the straightness of the roads would be a safety benefit. As a compliment to Ireland the British team chose to race in Shamrock green^{[a]} which thus became known as British racing green although the winning Napier of 1902 had been painted Olive green.

There was considerable public concern about safety after the 1901 Paris-Bordeaux Rally, in which at least eight people had been killed, and severe crashes during the 24 May 1903 Paris-Madrid race where more than 200 cars competed over a distance of 800 miles (1,287 km) but which had to be halted at Bordeaux because there had been so many fatalities. To allay these fears, the 1903 race was held over a closed course which had been carefully prepared for the event, and was marshalled by 7,000 police officers assisted by troops and club stewards, with strict instructions to keep spectators off the roads and away from corners. The route consisted of two loops that comprised a figure of eight, the first was a 52-mile loop that included Kilcullen, The Curragh, Kildare, Monasterevin, Ballydavis (Portlaoise), Stradbally, Athy, followed by a 40-mile loop through Castledermot, Carlow, and Athy again. The race started at the Ballyshannon cross-roads (53.0853°N 6.82°W) near Calverstown on the contemporary N78 heading north, then followed the N9 north; the N7 west; the N80 south; the N78 north again; the N9 south; the N80 north; the N78 north again.

The official timekeeper of the race was Mr. T. H. Woolen of the Automobile Club of Great Britain and Ireland. Ninety one Chronographs for timing the race were supplied by the Anglo-Swiss firm Stauffer Son & Co. of La Chaux-de-Fonds and London. Competitors were started at seven-minute intervals and had to follow bicycles through the 'control zones' in each town. The 328 miles (528 km) race was won by the famous Belgian Camille Jenatzy, driving a Mercedes in German colours.

=== 1904 Gordon Bennett Cup ===
The Times reported the 1904 Gordon Bennett motor race took place in Germany on 17 June over 342 miles (550 km), consisting of four laps of a course in the neighbourhood of Homburg. From the Saalburg, and old Roman fort, the course ran north to Usingen, where there was a control point (an inhabited or built up area where the cars had to travel slowly under the supervision of course officials) then through Graefenwiesbach to Weilburg, where there was a second control point, then past Allendorf and Obertiefenbach to Limburg. This section was reported to be the best part of the course for high speed and in practice some cars travelled at 150 km/h (93 mph). At Limburg there was another control, then the course ran through Kirberg to Neuhof, where there was a very bad turn, and then to Idstein where there was another control. It then ran through Glashuetten to Koenigstein (control), then via Friedrichshof and Oberursel (control) to Homburg (control) and back to Saalburg.

Officiating were Baron von Molitor of the German Automobile Club (Automobilclub von Deutschland), the official starter, and M. Tampier of the French Automobile Club who was timekeeper. The chronographs for timing the event were supplied by the Anglo-Swiss firm of Stauffer Son & Co. Officials from the other competing countries were also present.

There were 18 starters including three British entrants. The first car started from Saalburg at 7 a.m. The winner was Théry of France, who accomplished the four laps in 5 h 50 min 3 s, an average speed of 58.62 mph (94.34 km/h). Jenatzy was second, driving a Mercedes. The only British competitor placed was Sidney Girling driving a Wolseley. Australia's S. F. Edge, the 1902 winner who again drove a Napier, was reported to have held a good position during the first two laps, but was disqualified on lap three after receiving outside assistance due to tyre problems.

=== 1905 Gordon Bennett Cup ===
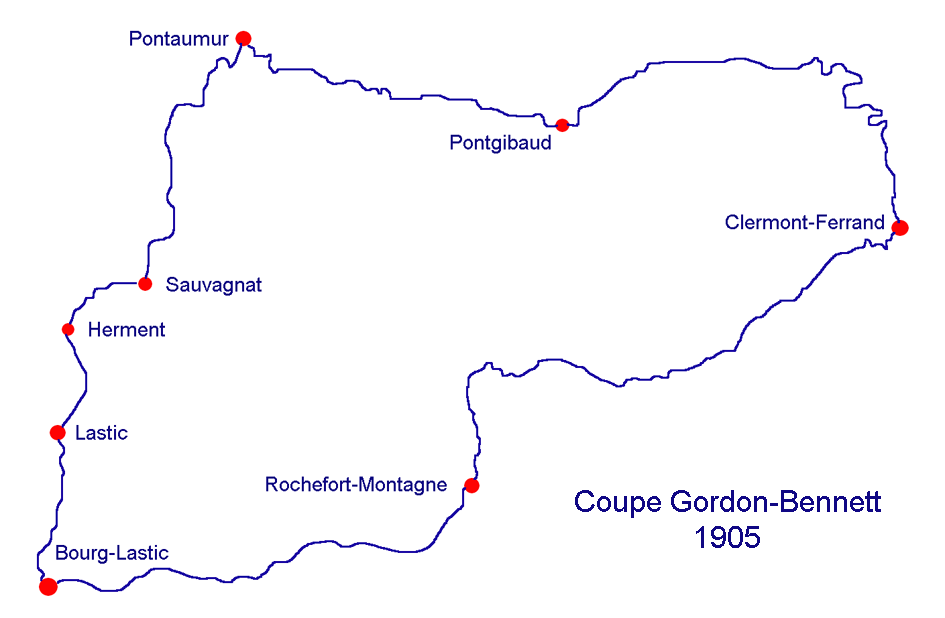
Gordon Bennett course 1905 – France

In 1905, The Times reported on the last of the six Gordon-Bennett Cup Races, which took place in France on 5 July over a 137 km mountainous circuit in the Auvergne near to Clermont-Ferrand. After four circuits of the course, a total of 548 km, which he completed in 7hr 2min 42sec, an average speed of 77.78 km/h, the Frenchman Léon Théry on a 96 hp Richard-Brasier won for the second year in a row. Lancia on a FIAT for Italy was fastest over the first two laps, but broke down with radiator problems during his third lap. Théry eventually came in first ahead of Nazzaro, also on a FIAT, who finished in 7hr 19min 9sec.

Chronographs for timing for the event were again supplied by Stauffer Son & Co.

The race took place on the doorstep of the Clermont-Ferrand headquarters of Michelin, and cars fitted with Michelin tyres took the first four places.

== Gordon Bennett Cup winners ==
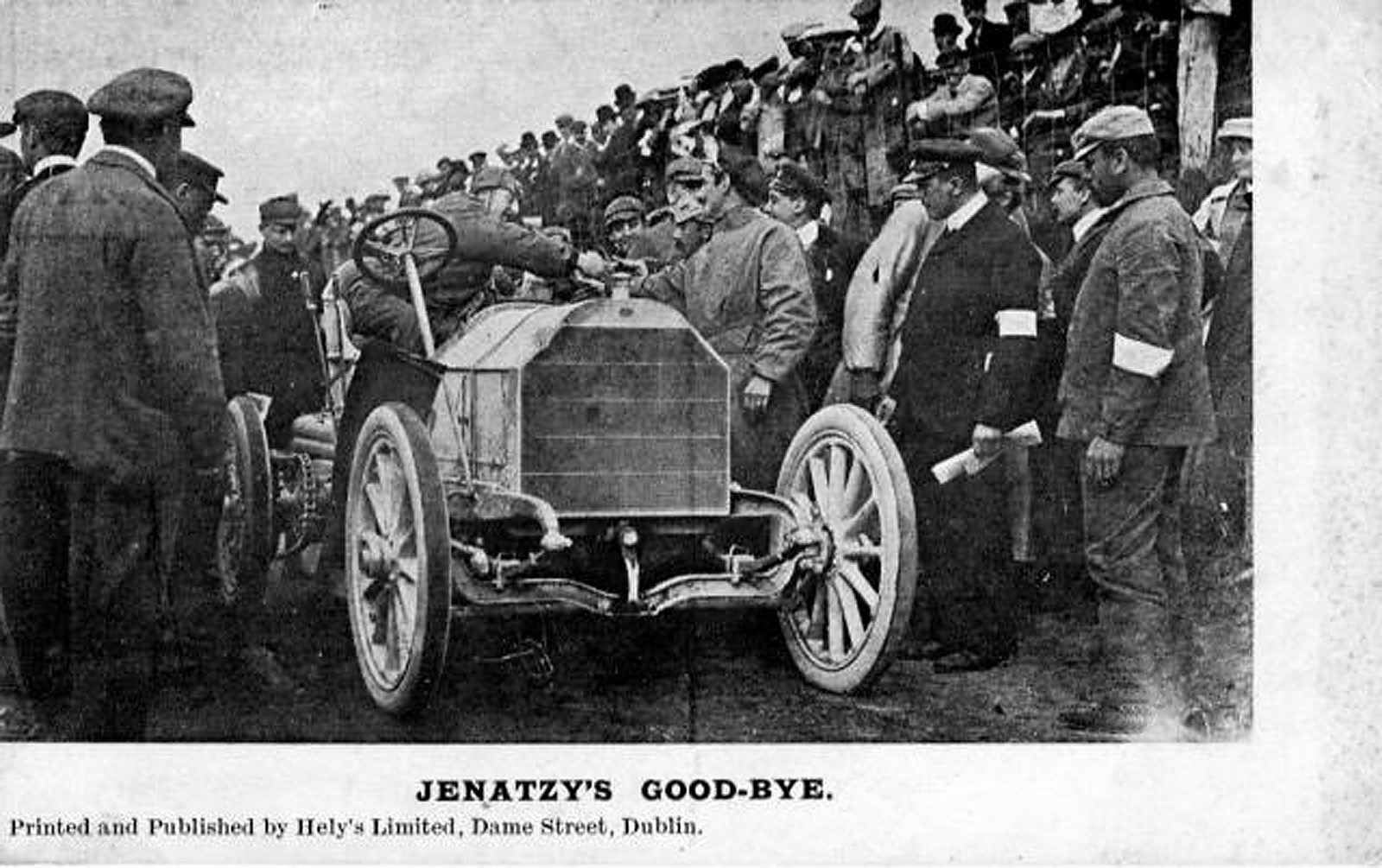
Jenatzy, 1903 winner

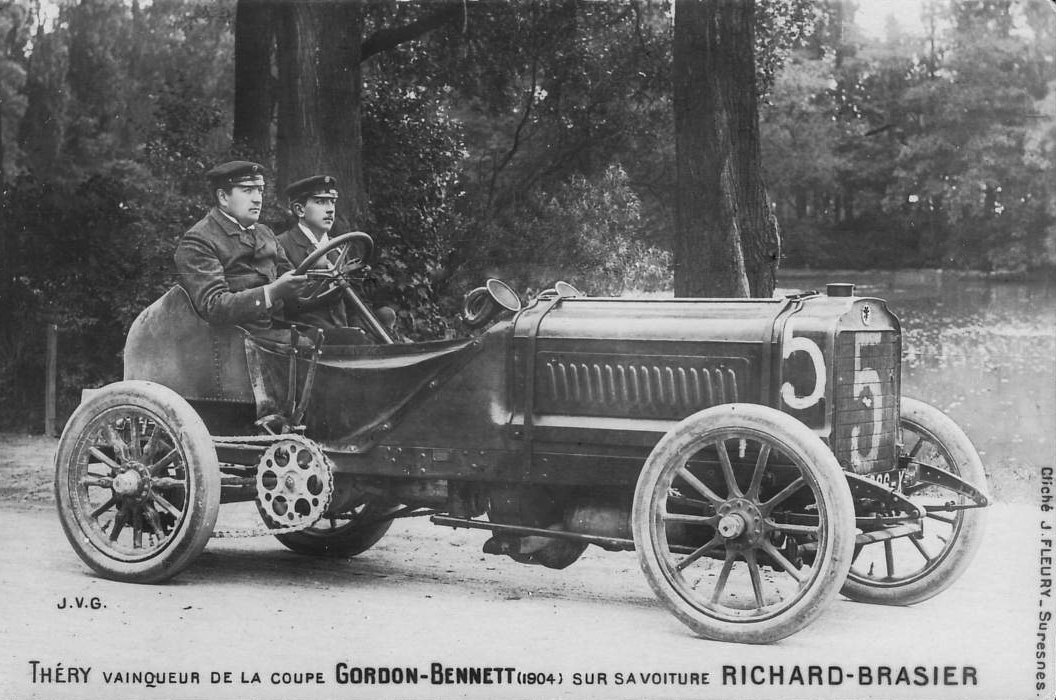
Théry, 1904 and 1905 winner

Year	Track	Winner	Car	Country
1900	Paris to Lyon, France	(France) Fernand Charron	Panhard	France
1901	Paris to Bordeaux, France	(France) Léonce Girardot	Panhard	France
1902	Paris, France to Innsbruck, Austria	(United Kingdom) Selwyn Edge	Napier	United Kingdom
1903	County Kildare & Queen's County, Ireland, then part of United Kingdom	(Belgium) Camille Jenatzy	Mercedes	Germany
1904	(German Empire) Taunus mountains in Germany	(France) Léon Théry	Richard-Brasier	France
1905	Clermont-Ferrand, Auvergne, France	(France) Léon Théry	Richard-Brasier	France

== Notes ==
a. According to Leinster Leader, Saturday, 11 April 1903, Britain had to choose a different colour to its usual national colours of red, white, and blue, as these had already been taken by Italy, Germany, and France respectively. It also stated red as the color for American cars in the 1903 Gordon Bennett Cup.
