= Lindeman Creek =

Lindeman Creek One-Mile River
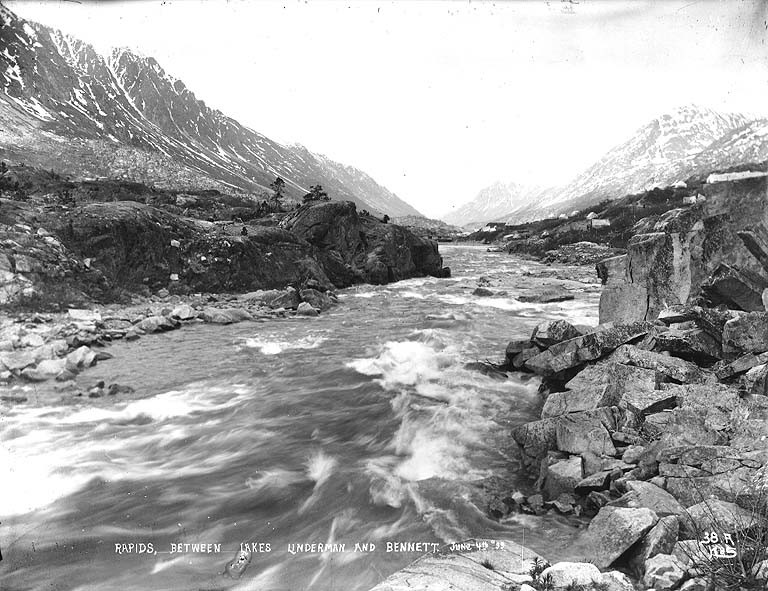
- Rapids on the river

- Location of mouth

Location
- Country: Canada
- Province: British Columbia
- District: Cassiar Land District

Physical characteristics
- Mouth
  - coordinates: 59°50′48″N 135°00′05″W

Lindeman Creek, formerly known as One Mile River connects Bennett Lake to Lindeman Lake, areas on the Chilkoot Trail in far northwestern British Columbia, Canada.

The caption for an 1897 Frank La Roche photograph refers to it as the Lewes River and featured in En Route to the Klondike (1898) with text saying: "Skill, cool heads and hard work are the necessary requirements for navigating the rapids of the Lewes River. Here is portrayed an exciting scene, similar to which everyone who goes to the Klondike in the same way must experience. Partly guided by ropes in the hands of men ashore and steered clear of dangerous rocks by men in the boat, the frail craft dashes and struggles along, at one time miraculously escaping destruction in a wild eddy and at another time gliding gracefully between jagged rocks that rise threateningly out of the seething waters. There is no time to think - a sharp lookout and a steady hand are the only means to victory over the angry waters of the rapids one meets en route to the Klondike."

In 1898 the river had its moment in history, during the Klondike Gold Rush. After hauling their supplies to the top of the trail, prospectors waited for the ice to break up. On May 28, 1898 it happened and the rush was on. In the first 24 hours 800 boats left down the river, with a total 7,000 boats carrying around 20,000 men leaving in the next two weeks for Dawson City.

After the initial rush to Dawson, Bennett stabilized into a major service centre for the thousands of mostly men who continued to pour North up the Chilkoot Trail. This prosperity was short lived though, as the White Pass and Yukon Route railway connecting Skagway, Bennett and Whitehorse was completed and navigating One Mile River was no longer needed. By 1901 the town of Bennett was in decline with some buildings moved away to be close to the railway station.

Bennett was home to several hotels, including the Arctic (later New Arctic), which was co-owned by Friedrich Trump, grandfather of Donald Trump. By July 1900, the hotel and brothel was advertising in the local newspaper The Bennett Sun of being the “Newest, Neatest and Best Equipped North of Vancouver“. Trump amassed a small fortune in the Yukon, starting with his hotel and brothel in Bennett beside One Mile River. In 1901 Trump took his money back to New York and there started in the real estate business.

The ghost town of Bennett, BC is a now tourist attraction.

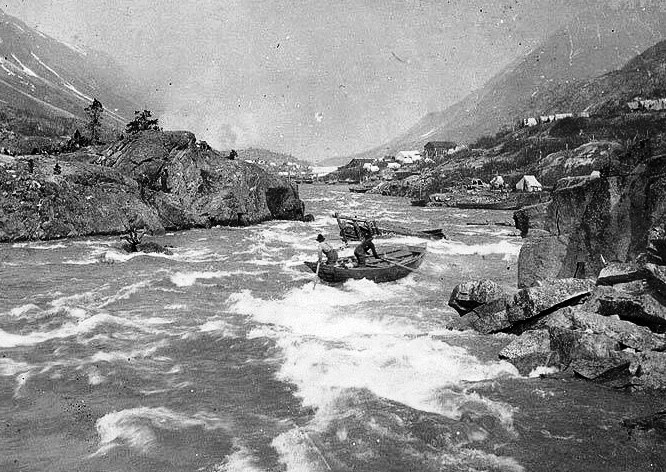
Small boats (scow) on the river during the gold rush era, 1898

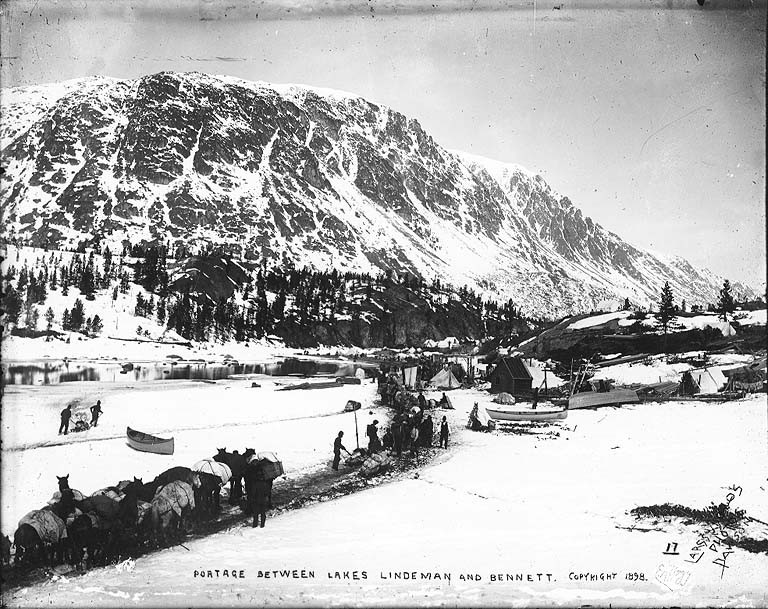
Packtrains carrying freight along One Mile River, 1898

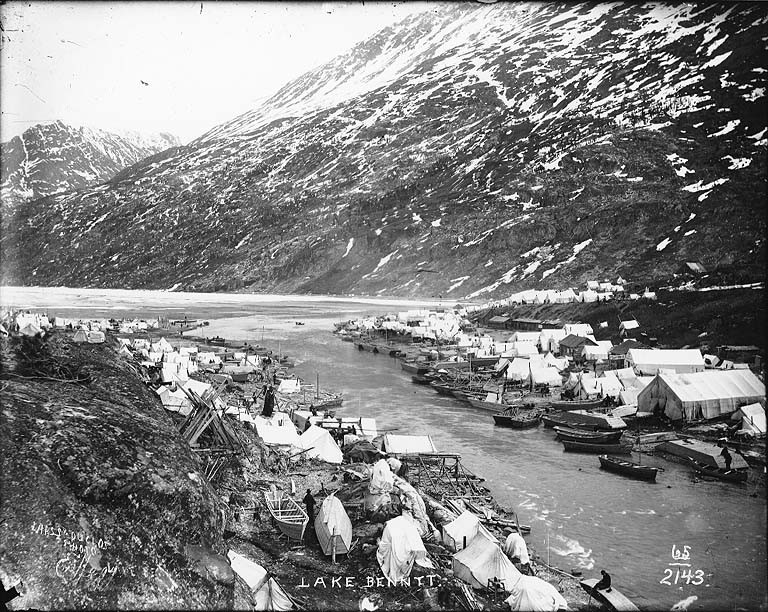
Bennett, British Columbia and Bennett Lake where they meet One Mile River, ca. 1898

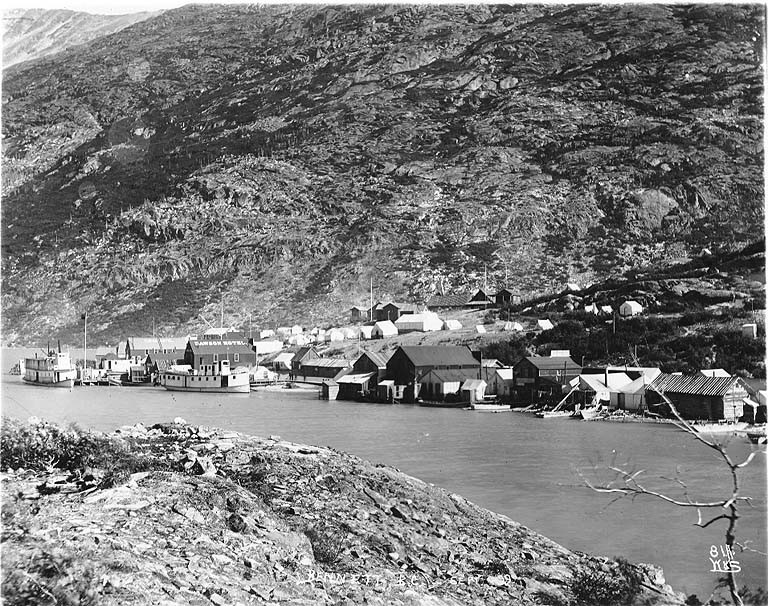
Eric A. Hegg photograph of Bennett along One Mile River

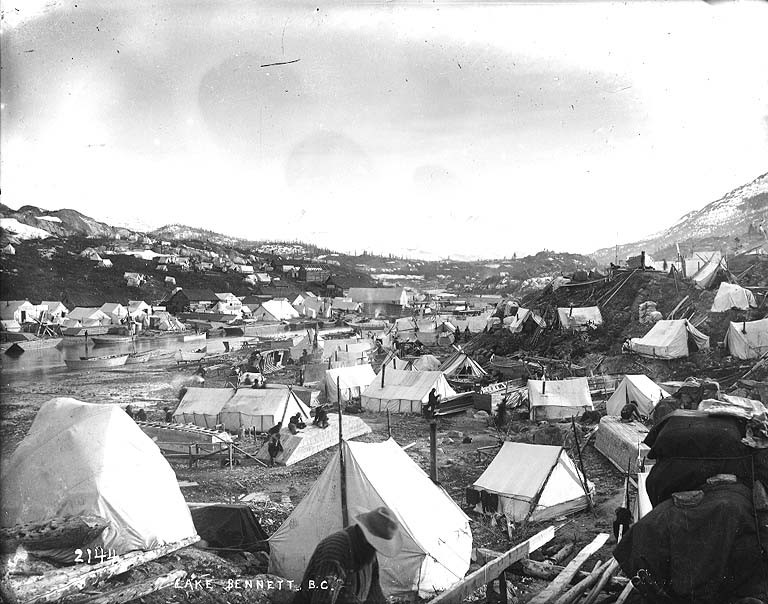
Tent camp with boat building activity and One Mile River in background

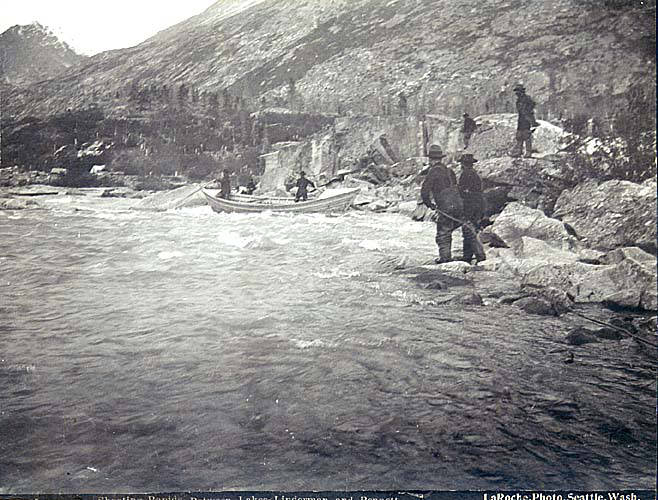
Boat attempting to navigate the river in 1897, photograph by Frank La Roche

== See also ==
- List of rivers of British Columbia
- Chilkoot Trail National Historic Site
- Bennett Peak (British Columbia)
- The Gold Rush
