= Frank La Roche =

American photographer

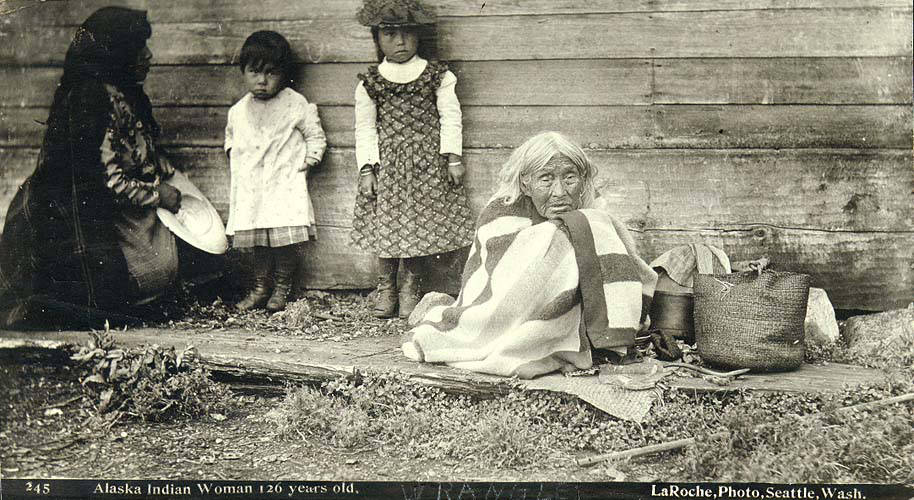
An old Native Alaskan woman and children in Wrangell, Alaska (1894)

Frank La Roche (June 20, 1853 – April 12, 1936) was an American photographer who captured scenes of the Klondike gold rush and Chilkoot trail as well as Seattle, Washington where he had a studio. He published a book of photographs with descriptions En Route to the Klondike in 1898.

La Roche was born and raised in Philadelphia. He worked as a photographer in several states. He arrived in Seattle soon after the Great Seattle Fire of 1889.

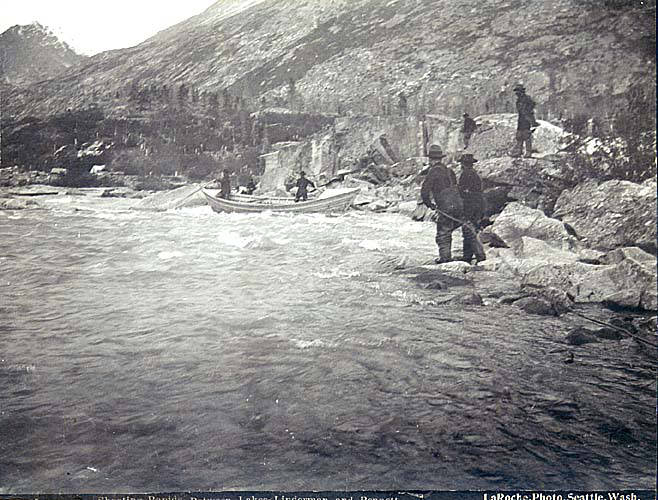
Boat attempting to navigate One Mile River in an 1897 La Roche photograph

The description for an 1897 La Roche photograph in his book refers to rapids on what he calls the Lewes River with text saying: "Skill, cool heads and hard work are the necessary requirements for navigating the rapids of the Lewes River. Here is portrayed an exciting scene, similar to which everyone who goes to the Klondike in the same way must experience. Partly guided by ropes in the hands of men ashore and steered clear of dangerous rocks by men in the boat, the frail craft dashes and struggles along, at one time miraculously escaping destruction in a wild eddy and at another time gliding gracefully between jagged rocks that rise threateningly out of the seething waters. There is no time to think - a sharp lookout and a steady hand are the only means to victory over the angry waters of the rapids one meets en route to the Klondike."

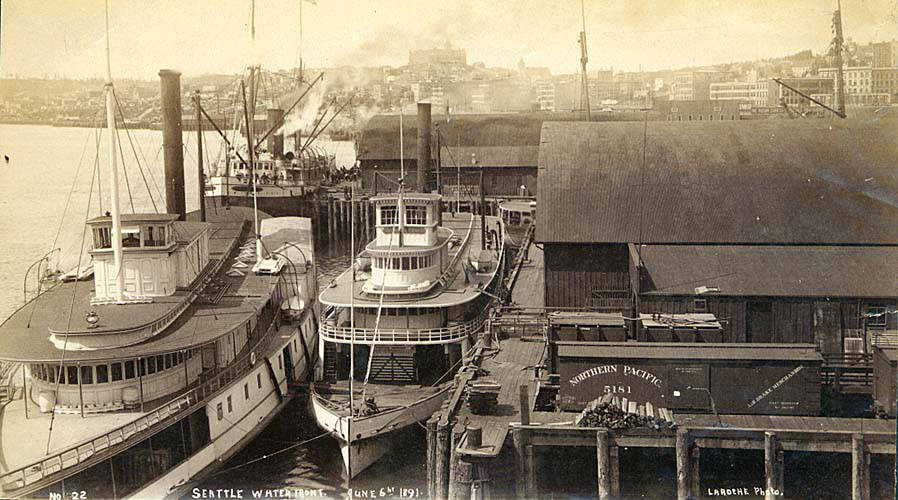
Dock at the foot of Main Street in Seattle (June 6, 1891)

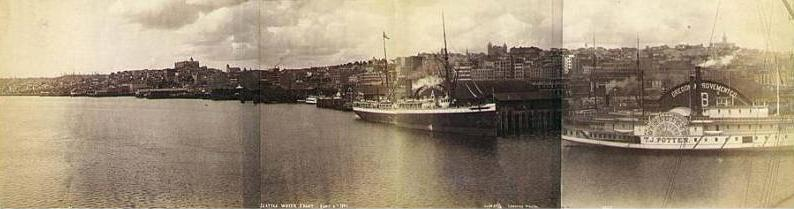
Panoramic photograph of the Seattle waterfront with T. J. Potter paddle steamer on right, 1891

He took a photograph from Denny Hill looking towards Lake Union. He also documented views of Skagway, Dyea, actresses on their way to the Klondike, and Tlingit.

La Roche died in Sedro-Woolley, Washington.
