= Lindeman Lake (Chilkoot Trail) =

Lake in Stikine Region, British Columbia, Canada

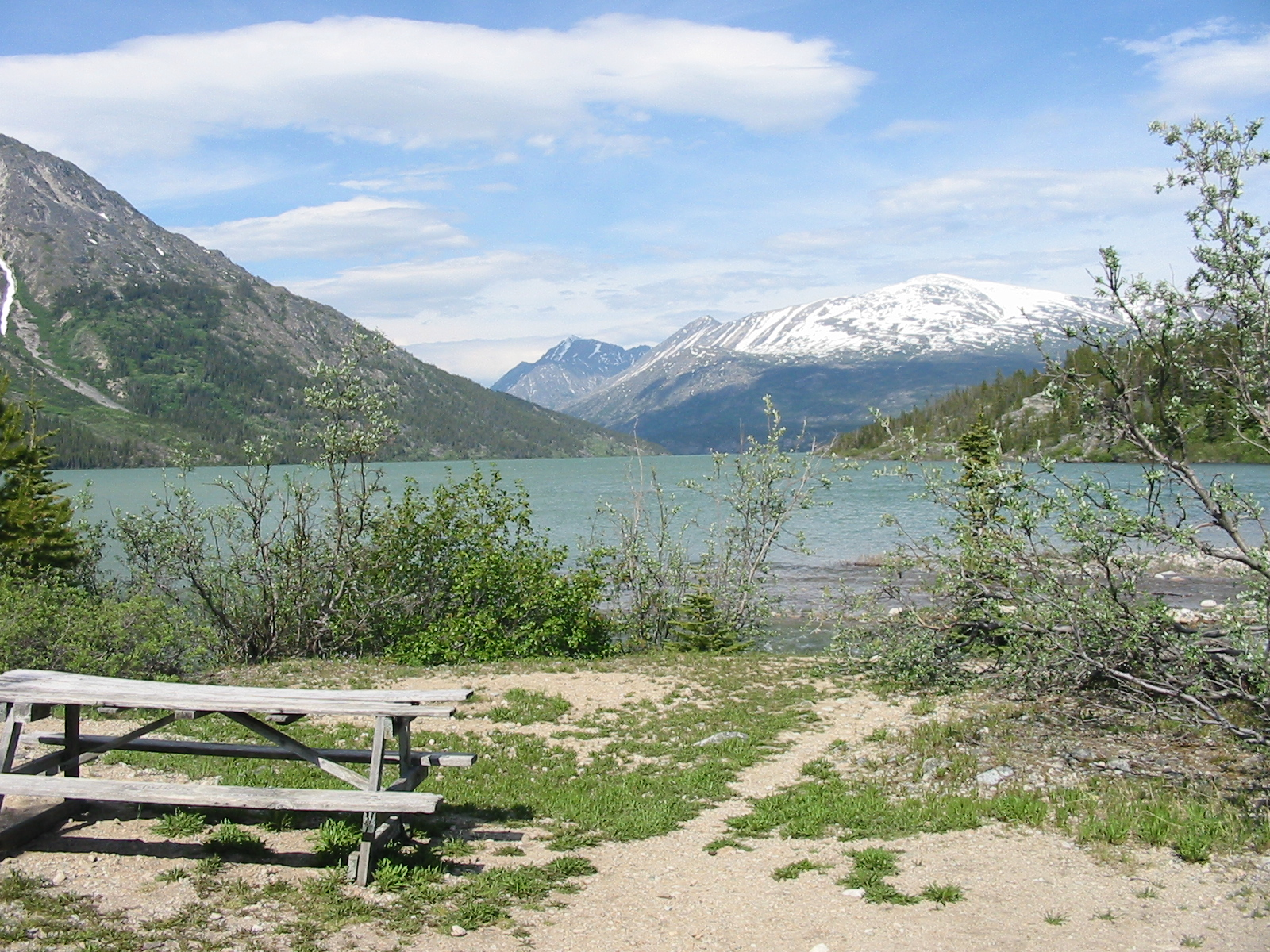

- Location within British Columbia
- Location: Northwestern British Columbia
- Coordinates: 59°48′15″N 135°02′30″W
- Primary inflows: Lindeman Creek
- Basin countries: Canada
- Settlements: Lindeman

Lindeman Lake, also known as Lake Lindeman, is a lake on the Chilkoot Trail in far northwestern British Columbia, Canada. It is just south of Bennett Lake and northeast of the summit of the Chilkoot Pass. From the direction of the pass it is fed by Lindeman Creek (formerly known as One Mile River), which connects the two lakes. Lake Lindeman and Lake Bennett were key components of the Chilkoot Trail during the Klondike Gold Rush, with both seeing hundreds of vessels built to transit their waters and camp-town "tent cities" established on their shores. Lindeman was located at the south end of Lindeman Lake, while Bennett, often known as Bennett City, was at the south end of Lake Bennett.

== See also ==
- List of lakes of British Columbia
