= 1903 Gordon Bennett Cup =

- Pre-1906 Grand Prix seasons
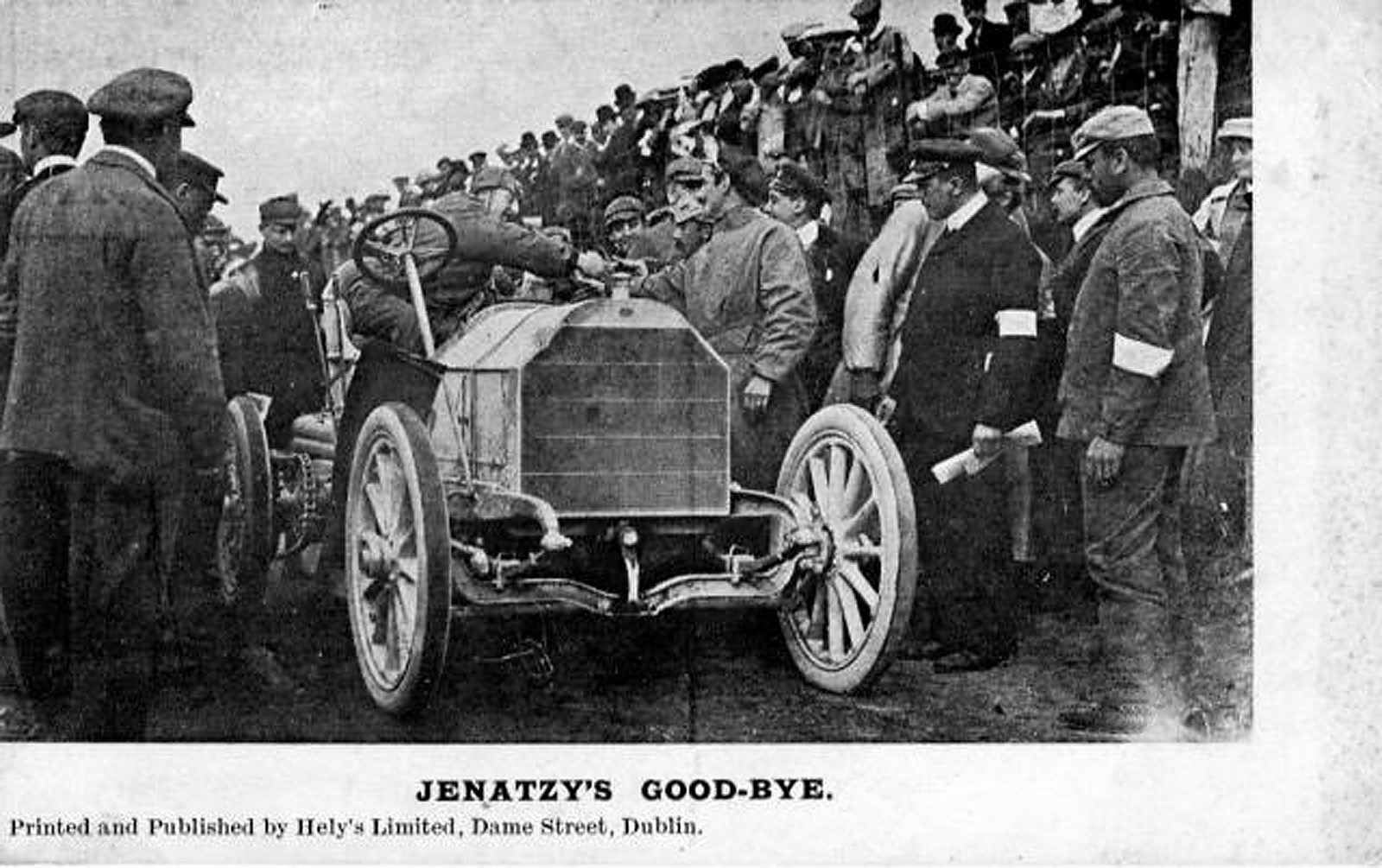

Race details
- Date: 2 July 1903
- Official name: IV Coupe Internationale
- Location: County Carlow, County Kildare, and Queen's County, Ireland
- Course: Public roads
- Course length: 64 & 83.5 km (40 & 51.88 miles)
- Distance: 3 & 4 laps, 527 km (327.5 miles)

Podium
First	(Belgium) Camille Jenatzy (BEL)	Mercedes
Second	(France) Rene de Knyff (FRA)	Panhard
Third	(France) Henri Farman (FRA)	Panhard

The 1903 Gordon Bennett Cup, formally titled the IV Coupe Internationale, was a motor race held on 2 July 1903 on the Athy Circuit, a circuit consisting of closed roads in Leinster, Ireland. The race consisted of seven laps, alternating for six laps over a shorter circuit to the west of Athy and longer circuit to the east, before a final lap on the longer circuit to make the total distance 527 km (327 mi).

The event is often referred to as "the race that saved motorsport" and was the first to be held on a closed circuit. This shift toward safer, closed-circuit formats came immediately after the deadly Paris–Madrid race of 1903, which had resulted in numerous fatalities and led organizers to seek more controlled environments for motor racing.

British driver Selwyn Edge had won the 1902 Gordon Bennett Cup, which meant that the rights to host the race fell to the Automobile Club of Britain and Ireland. As racing on British roads was illegal, legislation was passed to allow the race to take place on roads in Ireland, which was then part of the United Kingdom of Great Britain and Ireland. Britain was to attempt to defend the Gordon Bennett Cup against France, Germany, and the United States, with each country was represented by three entries, with the car that finished the race in the shortest time winning the race on behalf of his country.

The race was won by Camille Jenatzy driving a Mercedes and representing Germany, in a time of six hours and 39 minutes, at an average speed of 79.2 km/h (49.2 mph). Rene de Knyff and Henry Farman, both driving Panhards and representing France finished in second and third places, taking a little over ten minutes longer to complete the course than Jenatzy.

== Race report ==
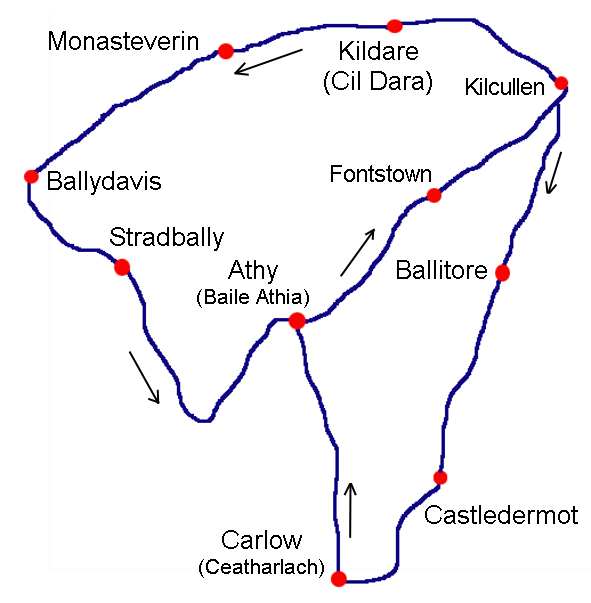
Circuit map for the 1903 Gordon Bennett Trophy

On Thursday, 2 July 1903 the Gordon Bennett Cup was the first international motor race to be held in Ireland, an honorific to Selwyn Edge who had won the 1902 event in the Paris-Vienna race driving a Napier. The Automobile Club of Great Britain and Ireland wanted the race to be hosted in the British Isles, and their secretary, Claude Johnson, suggested Ireland as the venue because of public hostility to motoring in Great Britain. The editor of the Dublin Motor News, Richard J. Mecredy, suggested an area in County Kildare, and letters were sent to 102 Irish MPs, 90 Irish peers, 300 newspapers, 34 chairmen of county and local councils, 34 County secretaries, 26 mayors, 41 railway companies, 460 hoteliers, 13 PPs, and the Bishop of Kildare and Leighlin Patrick Foley, who pronounced himself in favour. Local laws had to be adjusted, so the "Light Locomotives (Ireland) Bill" was passed on 27 March 1903 permitting the race to go ahead. Kildare and other local councils drew attention to their areas, while Queen's County declared "That every facility will be given and the roads placed at the disposal of motorists during the proposed race." Eventually Kildare was chosen, partly on the grounds that the straightness of the roads would be a safety benefit. As a compliment to Ireland the British team chose to race in shamrock green, which thus became known as British racing green, although the winning Napier of 1902 had been painted olive green.

There was considerable public concern about safety after the 1901 Gordon Bennett Cup, in which at least eight people had been killed, and severe accidents during the 24 May 1903 Paris-Madrid race where more than 200 cars competed over a distance of 800 miles (1,287 km) but which had to be halted at Bordeaux because there had been so many accidents. To allay these fears the 1903 race was held over a closed course which had been carefully prepared for the event, and was marshalled by 7,000 police officers assisted by troops and club stewards, with strict instructions to keep spectators off the roads and away from corners. The route consisted of two loops in a figure eight, the first a 52 mi (84 km) loop including Kilcullen, The Curragh, Kildare, Monasterevin, Stradbally, and Athy, followed by a 40 mi (64 km) loop through Castledermot, Carlow, and Athy again. The race started at the Ballyshannon cross-roads (53.0853°N 6.82°W) near Calverstown on the contemporary N78 heading north, then followed the N9 north; the N7 west; the N80 south; the N78 north again; the N9 south; the N80 north; the N78 north again. The official timekeeper of the race was Mr. T. H. Woolen of the Automobile Club of Great Britain and Ireland. Ninety-one Chronographs for timing the race were supplied by the Anglo-Swiss firm Stauffer Son & Co. of La Chaux-de-Fonds and London. Competitors were started at seven-minute intervals and had to follow bicycles through the "control zones" in each town.

The 328 mi (528 km) race was won by the famous Belgian Camille Jenatzy, driving a Mercedes in German colours. It was "inferior in terms of horse power", but suited to Jenazy's driving style, and he turned in a spectacular performance. His purse for the win was £8,000.

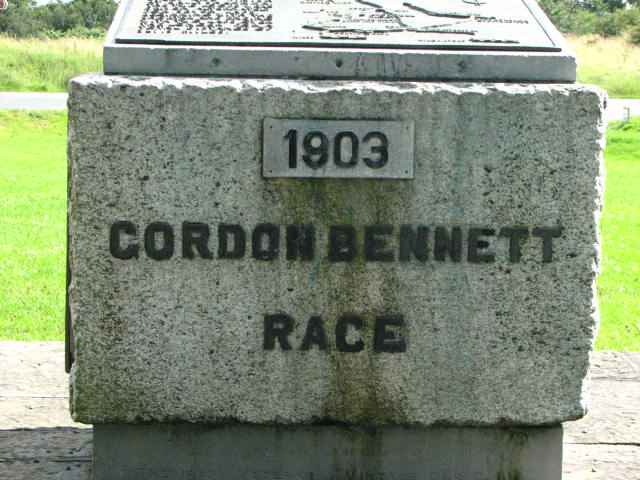
Commemorative monument to the race in the Moat of Ardscull

== Classification ==
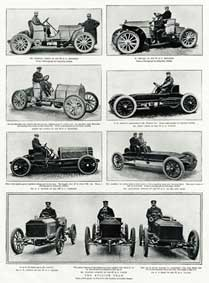
Magazine spread showing three Gordon Bennett Cup Teams in 1903: German Mercedes (top), USA Wintons and Peerless (middle) and British Napiers (bottom)

Pos	Driver	starting for	Constructor	Time/Retired
1	(Belgium) Camille Jenatzy (BEL)	Germany	Mercedes	6:39:00
2	(France) René de Knyff (FRA)	France	Panhard	6:50:40
3	(France) Henry Farman (FRA)	France	Panhard	6:51:44
4	(France) Fernand Gabriel (FRA)	France	Mors	7:11:33
DSQ	(United Kingdom) Selwyn Edge (GBR)	Great Britain	Napier	~~9:18:48~~ Outside assistance
Ret	(Belgium) Pierre de Caters (BEL)	Germany	Mercedes	Axle
Ret	(United States) Percy Owen (USA)	USA	Winton	?
Ret	(United States) Alexander Winton (USA)	USA	Winton	?
Ret	(United States) James Foxhall-Keene (USA)	Germany	Mercedes	Axle
Ret	(United States) Louis Mooers (USA)	USA	Peerless	?
Ret	(United Kingdom) Charles Jarrott (GBR)	Great Britain	Napier	Steering/Collision
Ret	(United Kingdom) J.W. Stocks (GBR)	Great Britain	Napier	Collision
