= Helen Jewett =

New York City prostitute and murder victim

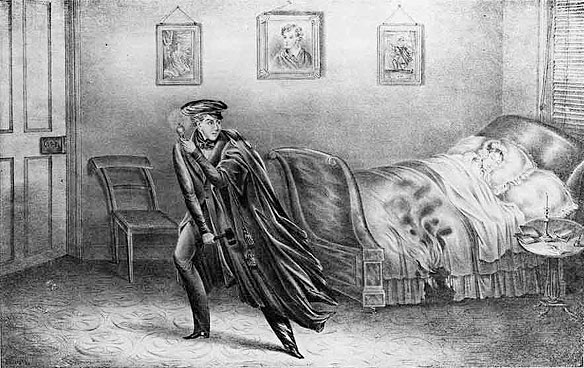
An illustration of the murder scene from a pamphlet. With hatchet in hand, Richard P. Robinson is on the left.

Helen Jewett (born Dorcas Doyen; October 18, 1813 – April 10, 1836) was an American prostitute in New York City who was brutally murdered. One of her regular clients, Richard P. Robinson, was tried and sensationally acquitted of her murder. Jewett's murder and Robinson's subsequent trial was one of the first sex scandals to receive detailed press reporting, notably in the New York Herald. Public opinion was divided between those who felt that Jewett had deserved her fate, and others claiming that Robinson had escaped justice through powerful connections.

== Early history ==
Jewett was born Dorcas Doyen into a working-class family in Temple, Maine. Her father was an alcoholic; her mother died when Jewett was young. From the age of 12 or 13, Jewett was employed as a servant girl in the home of Chief Justice Nathan Weston of the Maine Supreme Judicial Court. Upon reaching the age of 18, Jewett left the Weston home at the first opportunity. She moved to Portland, Maine, where she worked as a prostitute under an assumed name. She subsequently moved to Boston and finally New York under a succession of fake names.

== The murder ==
Jewett's body was discovered by the matron of the brothel, Rosina Townsend, at 3 a.m. on April 10, 1836. The murder had taken place sometime after midnight. Jewett was struck on the head three times with a sharp object. (The coroner's report called it a 'hatchet'.) Based on the position of the corpse in bed, the coroner concluded that the blows were not expected: there were no signs of struggle. After inflicting the lethal blows, the murderer then set fire to Jewett's bed. Townsend discovered the room full of smoke, and Jewett's body charred on one side.

== The trial ==
Based on the testimony of the women who lived in the brothel, the police arrested 19-year-old Richard P. Robinson on suspicion of Jewett's murder. Robinson, a repeat customer of the victim, flatly denied killing her, and did not display much emotion even when confronted with the still warm corpse. Nevertheless, based on the testimony of various witnesses and the recovery of a cloak that resembled Robinson's, the coroner's jury, hastily assembled on the scene and made up of on-lookers, concluded that Jewett met her end "by blows ... inflicted ... with a hatchet by the hand of Richard P. Robinson." This was enough to gain an initial indictment.

On June 2, 1836, Robinson's trial for murder began. Ex-D.A. of New York Ogden Hoffman appeared for the defense. After days of testimony from several witnesses, including Rosina Townsend, the judge gave the jury its instructions. As most of the witnesses were other prostitutes, the judge ordered his jury to disregard their testimony. Presented primarily with circumstantial evidence against Robinson, the jury returned a verdict of not guilty in less than a half hour.

== The press ==
Jewett's murder excited the press and the public. The coverage of the murder and trial was highly polarized, with reporters either sympathizing with Jewett and vilifying Robinson or attacking Jewett as a seductress who deserved her fate. The New York Herald, edited by James Gordon Bennett, Sr., provided the most complete (if not unbiased) coverage of the sensational murder. Almost from the beginning and throughout the trial, Bennett insisted that Robinson was the innocent victim of a vicious conspiracy launched by the police and Jewett's madam. He also emphasized the sensational nature of the story and worked to exploit the sexual, violent details of Jewett's death. The New York Sun, in contrast, whose readers tended to come from the working class, argued that Robinson was guilty and that he was able to use money and the influence of wealthy relatives and his employer to buy an acquittal. This theory continued to gain traction for many years later.

Most notably, the trial was largely responsible for nationwide changes in the approach to sex and scandal coverage by American journalists. Prior to the case, coverage of such topics by major newspapers was nearly nonexistent. Additionally, some historians credit Bennett with the first journalistic interview, namely that of Rosina Townsend. Other historians, however, argue that Bennett never actually talked to Townsend and that his reported interview was a hoax.

== Post trial ==
Personal letters of Robinson's that became public after the trial undercut some of his claims and showed him to be capable of vicious and (for the time) deviant sexual behavior and the public turned against him, including some who had been his vocal supporters. Robinson eventually moved to Texas, where he became a respected frontier citizen.

== References in popular culture ==
Jewett and Robinson are the subject of The Lives of Helen Jewett, And Richard P. Robinson, an 1849 novel by journalist George Wilkes. The novel was originally published in serial form in Wilkes' newspaper the National Police Gazette. This story is a fictionalized narrative based around the stories about Jewett and Robinson that circulated after the murder.

Jewett is a character in the novel Burr by Gore Vidal—being the love interest of the narrator. Although her murder is peripheral to the story, it is foreshadowed throughout by the title character's having secured, in a notorious trial at the turn of the century, the acquittal of Levi Weeks, the apparent murderer of Elma Sands.

== See also ==
- List of unsolved murders (before 1900)
