= Bennett Peak (British Columbia) =

Mountain in British Columbia, Canada

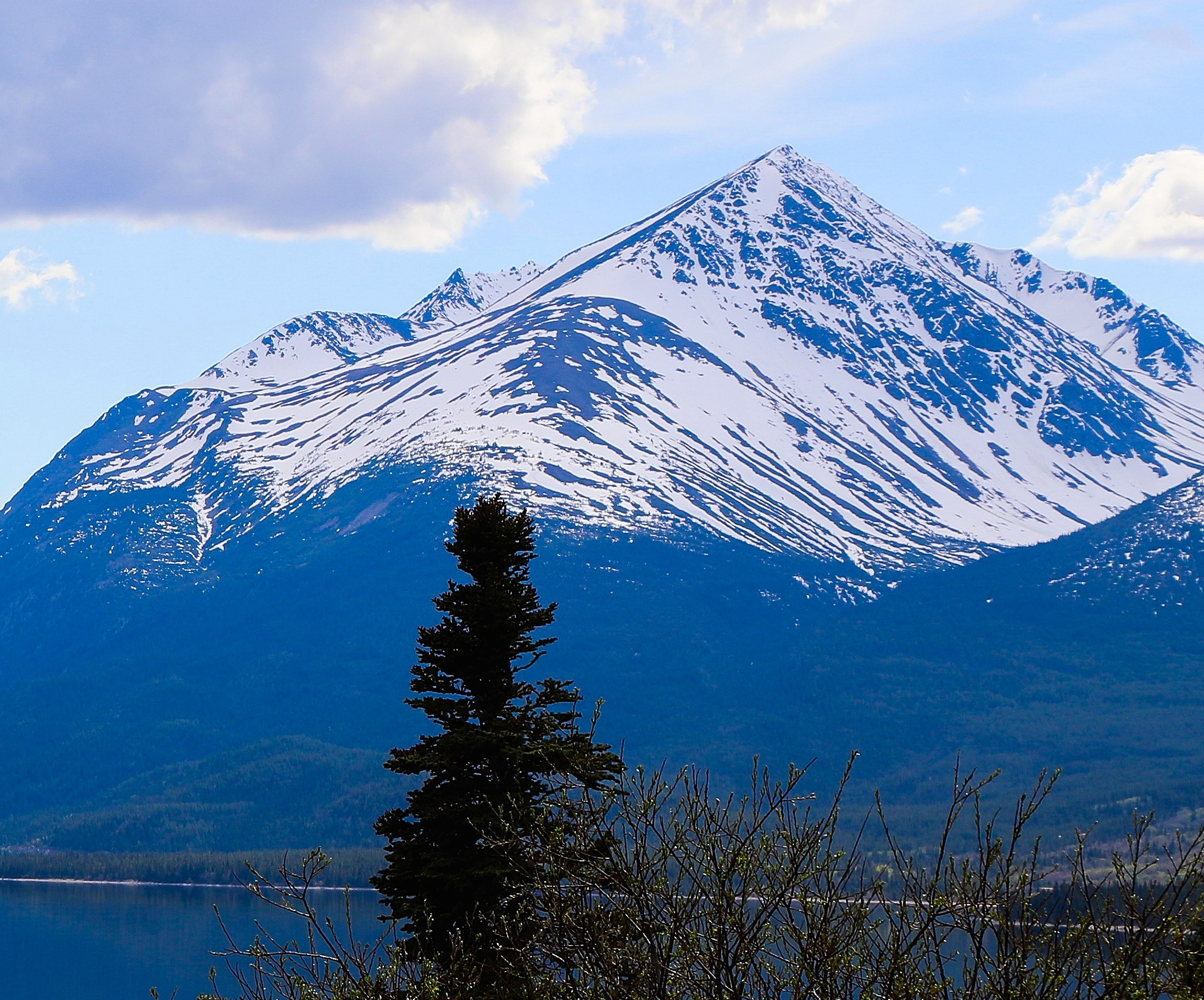
- North aspect

Highest point
- Elevation: 2,123 m (6,965 ft)
- Prominence: 1,223 m (4,012 ft)
- Isolation: 6.89 km (4.28 mi)
- Coordinates: 59°57′23″N 134°58′15″W

Geography
- Location within British Columbia Location within Canada
- Interactive map of Bennett Peak
- Country: Canada
- Province: British Columbia
- District: Stikine Region
- Parent range: Coast Mountains
- Topo map: NTS 104M15 Tutshi Lake

Bennett Peak is in the Stikine Region of British Columbia, Canada, near the border with Yukon. The elevation is variously stated as 2,052 meters (6,732 feet) and 2,123 meters (6,965 feet).

Like the nearby ghost town of Bennett, British Columbia and Bennett Lake, the peak is presumably named for James Gordon Bennett, Jr., the editor of the New York Herald and a sponsor of exploration.

== See also ==
- Stikine people
- One Mile River (Lindemann Creek)
