= Bennett Peak (New Mexico) =

Landmark in the United States

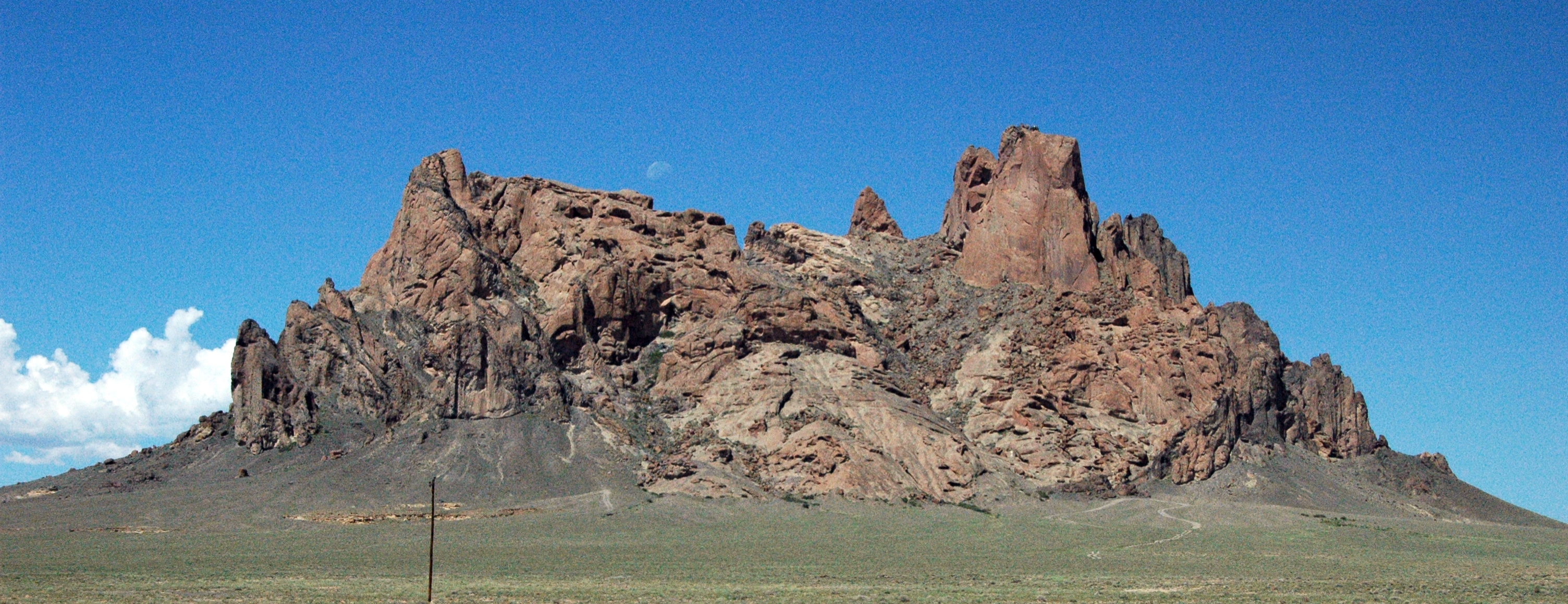
- East aspect

Highest point
- Elevation: 6,471 ft (1,972 m)
- Prominence: 771 ft (235 m)
- Parent peak: Two Grey Hills (6,591 ft)
- Isolation: 9.2 mi (14.8 km)
- Coordinates: 36°22′35″N 108°44′22″W

Geography
- Location within New Mexico Location within the United States
- Location: San Juan County, New Mexico, US
- Parent range: Chuska Mountains; Colorado Plateau
- Topo map: USGS Little Water

Geology
- Rock age: Oligocene
- Mountain type: Volcanic plug
- Rock type: Volcanic breccia

Climbing
- First ascent: 1992
- Easiest route: class 5.8 climbing

Bennett Peak is a 6,471-foot (1,972-meter) elevation summit located on Navajo Nation land in San Juan County of northwest New Mexico, United States. It is a landmark set one mile west of U.S. Route 491, along with Ford Butte on the opposite side of the highway. Bennett Peak is one of the major diatremes of the Four Corners area, and with significant relief as it rises 1,175 feet (358 meters) above the high-desert plain. It is situated about 22 miles (35 km) south of Shiprock, the most famous of these diatremes. Bennett Peak is set in the northeastern part of the Navajo Volcanic Field, a volcanic field that includes intrusions and flows of minette and other unusual igneous rocks which formed around 30 million years ago during the Oligocene. Bennett Peak lies within the Chaco River drainage basin.

== History ==
US Army Lt. James H. Simpson of the United States Corps of Topographical Engineers passed here on August 30, 1849, and recorded in his journal about these splendid peaks. Bennett Peak was later named after Major Frank Tracy Bennett (1840–1894), 9th Cavalry, who served as agent to the Navajos from 1869 to 1871 and 1880–81. This geographical feature's name was officially adopted in 1915 by the U.S. Board on Geographic Names. The Navajo name for this peak, Tsézhin ‘Ií’áhí, means "Trap rocks sticking up". The first ascent of this peak was made in 1992 by Cameron Burns and Luke Laeser. Scenes from the 2014 movie "Beyond the Reach" were filmed at Bennett Peak.

== Gallery ==
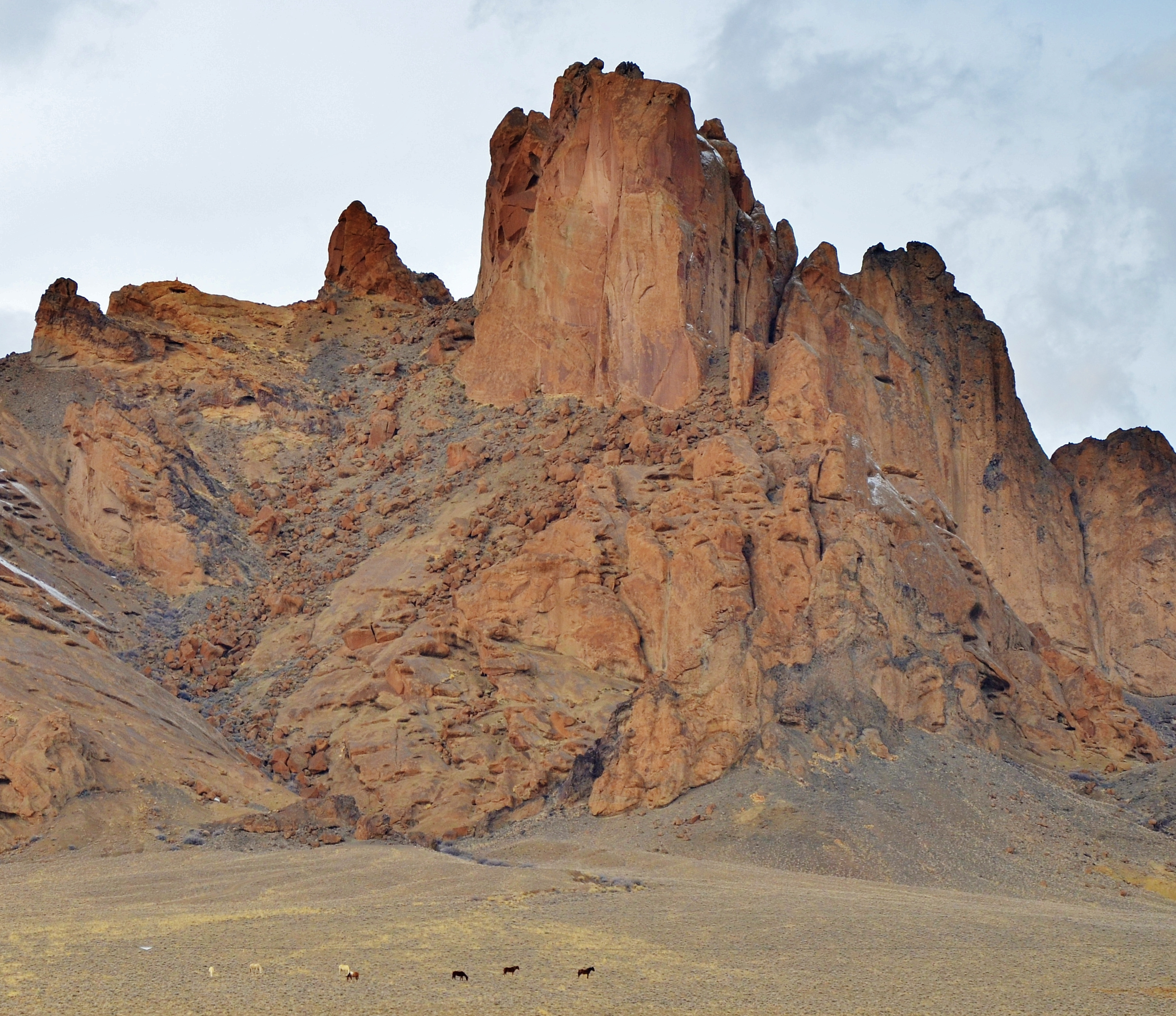

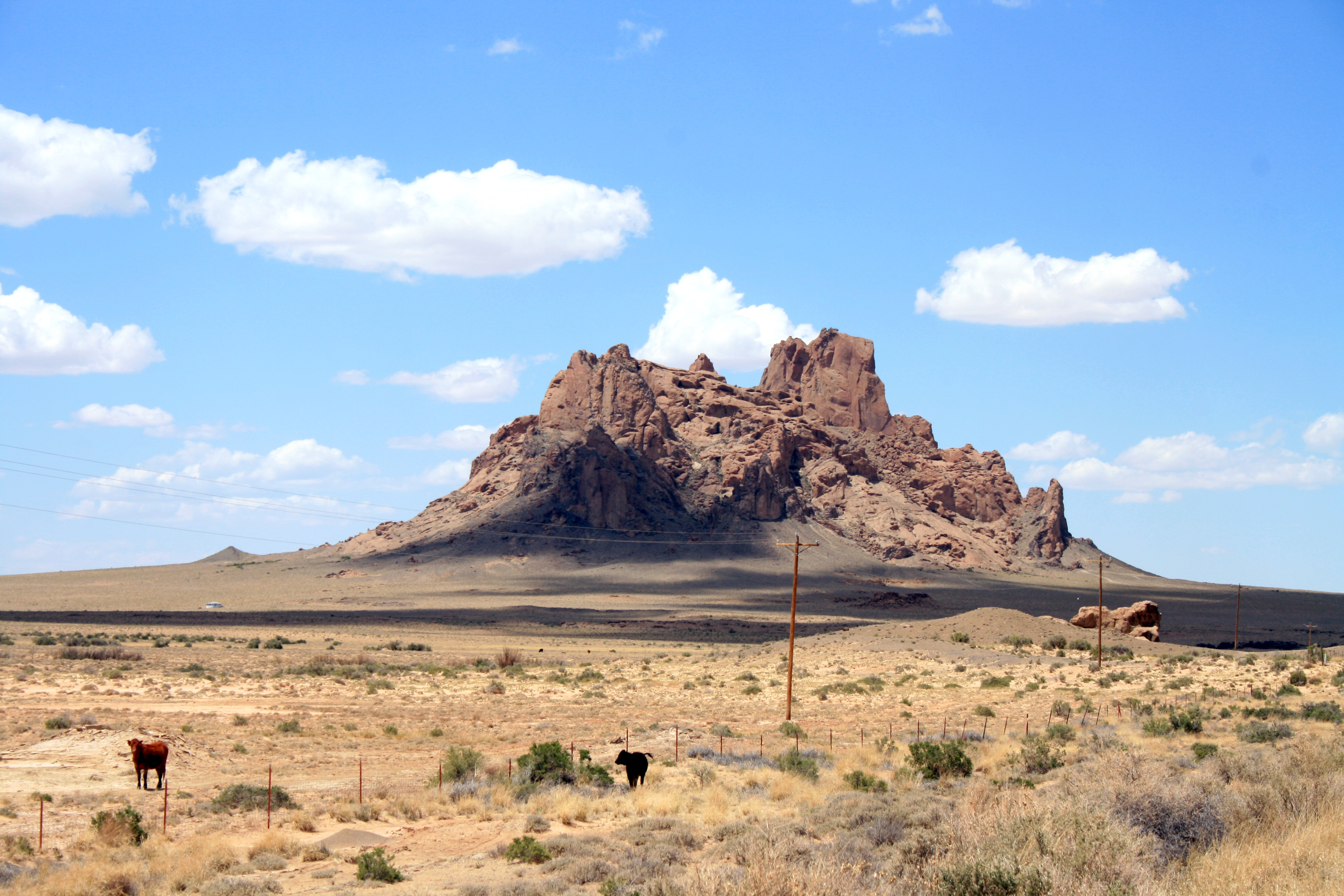
From southeast

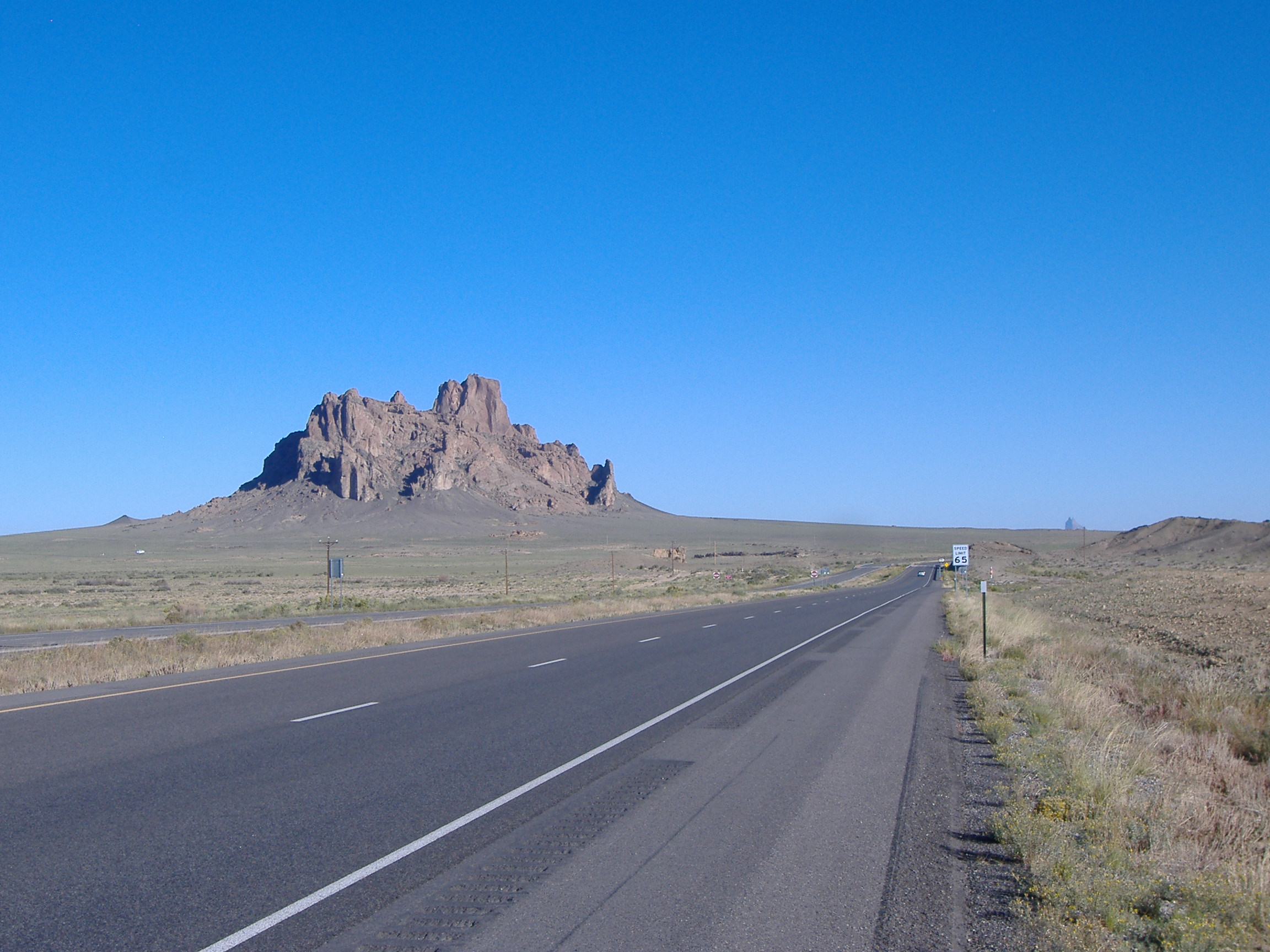
From southeast and Highway 491

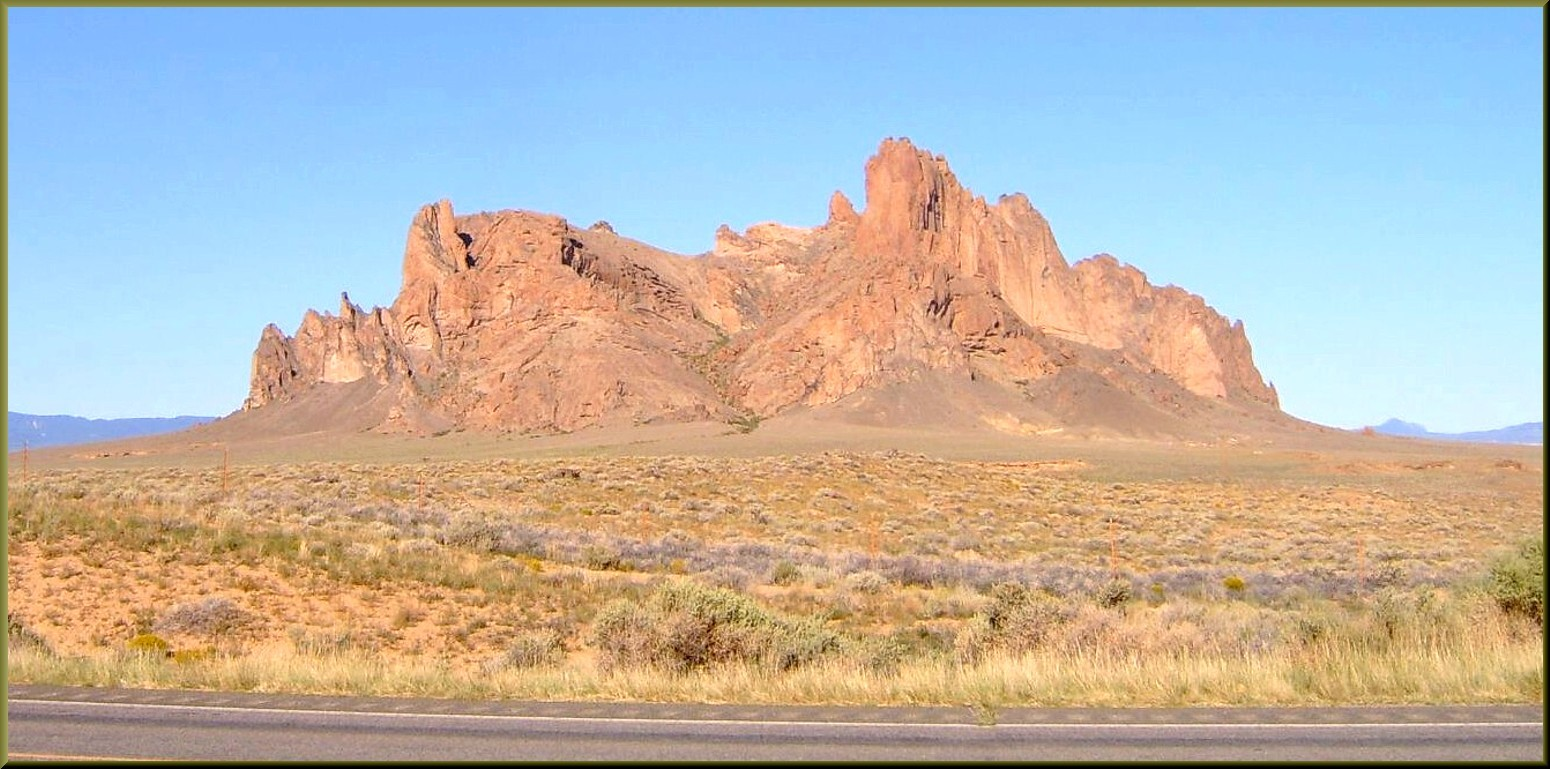
From east

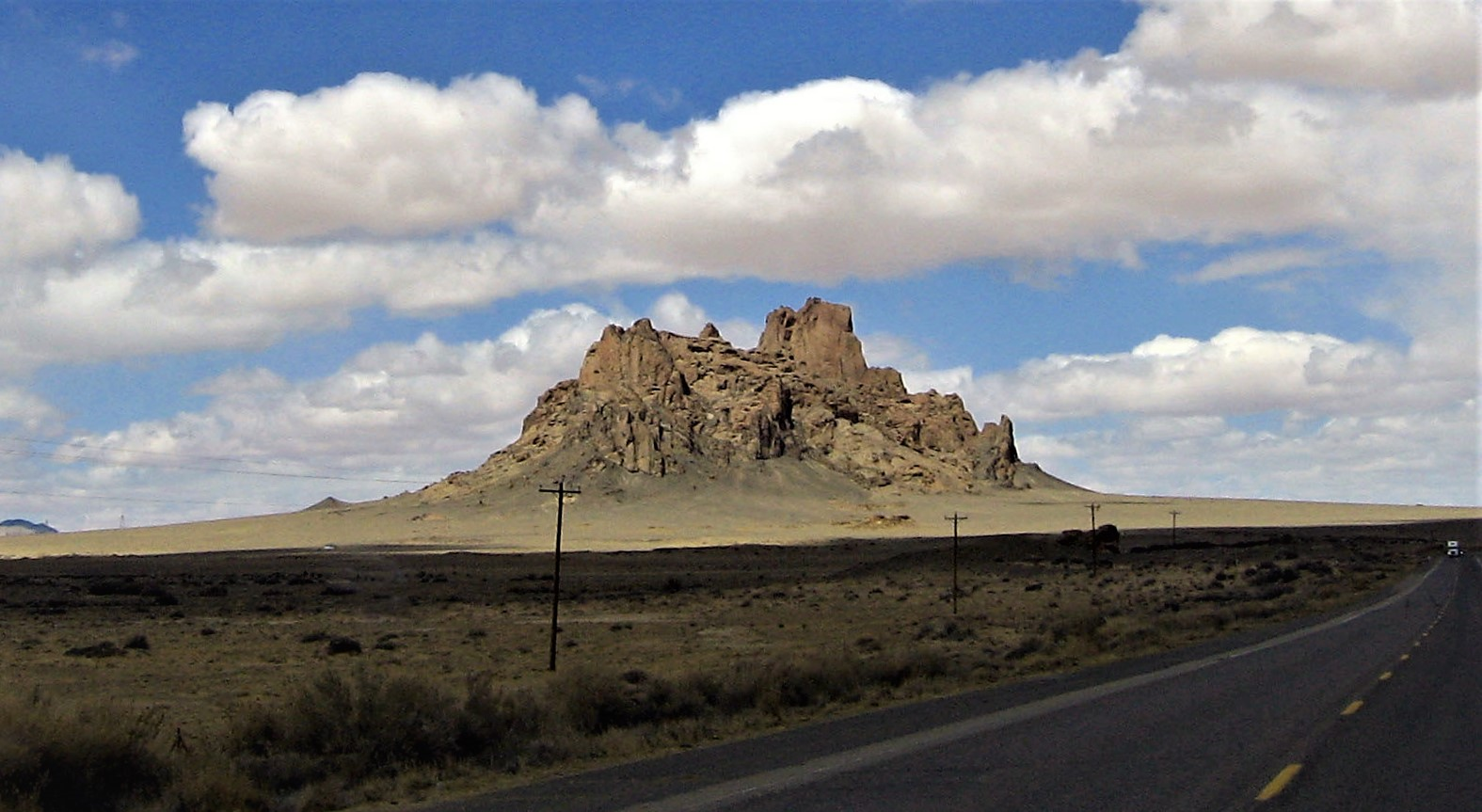

== Climate ==
According to the Köppen climate classification system, Bennett Peak is located in a semi-arid climate zone with cold winters and hot summers. Climate data for Shiprock, New Mexico, 30 miles to the north.

Climate data for Shiprock, NM
Month	Jan	Feb	Mar	Apr	May	Jun	Jul	Aug	Sep	Oct	Nov	Dec	Year
Record high °F (°C)	66 (19)	78 (26)	83 (28)	91 (33)	99 (37)	107 (42)	109 (43)	106 (41)	99 (37)	92 (33)	78 (26)	72 (22)	109 (43)
Mean daily maximum °F (°C)	43.0 (6.1)	50.6 (10.3)	59.9 (15.5)	70.0 (21.1)	79.8 (26.6)	90.1 (32.3)	94.6 (34.8)	91.9 (33.3)	85.1 (29.5)	72.4 (22.4)	56.2 (13.4)	44.1 (6.7)	69.8 (21.0)
Mean daily minimum °F (°C)	15.7 (−9.1)	21.5 (−5.8)	27.5 (−2.5)	34.9 (1.6)	43.8 (6.6)	51.2 (10.7)	58.8 (14.9)	57.3 (14.1)	48.0 (8.9)	36.0 (2.2)	25.1 (−3.8)	16.9 (−8.4)	36.4 (2.5)
Record low °F (°C)	−18 (−28)	−14 (−26)	2 (−17)	9 (−13)	15 (−9)	28 (−2)	30 (−1)	33 (1)	21 (−6)	10 (−12)	0 (−18)	−26 (−32)	−26 (−32)
Average precipitation inches (mm)	0.46 (12)	0.46 (12)	0.54 (14)	0.41 (10)	0.51 (13)	0.29 (7.4)	0.66 (17)	1.00 (25)	0.80 (20)	0.78 (20)	0.52 (13)	0.57 (14)	7 (177.4)
Average snowfall inches (cm)	1.6 (4.1)	0.7 (1.8)	0.6 (1.5)	0 (0)	0 (0)	0 (0)	0 (0)	0 (0)	0 (0)	0 (0)	0.2 (0.51)	1.0 (2.5)	4.1 (10.41)
Source: http://www.wrcc.dri.edu/cgi-bin/cliMAIN.pl?nm8284

== See also ==
- Rock formations in the United States
- Volcanic plug
