= James Gordon Bennett Jr. =

American publisher (1841–1918)

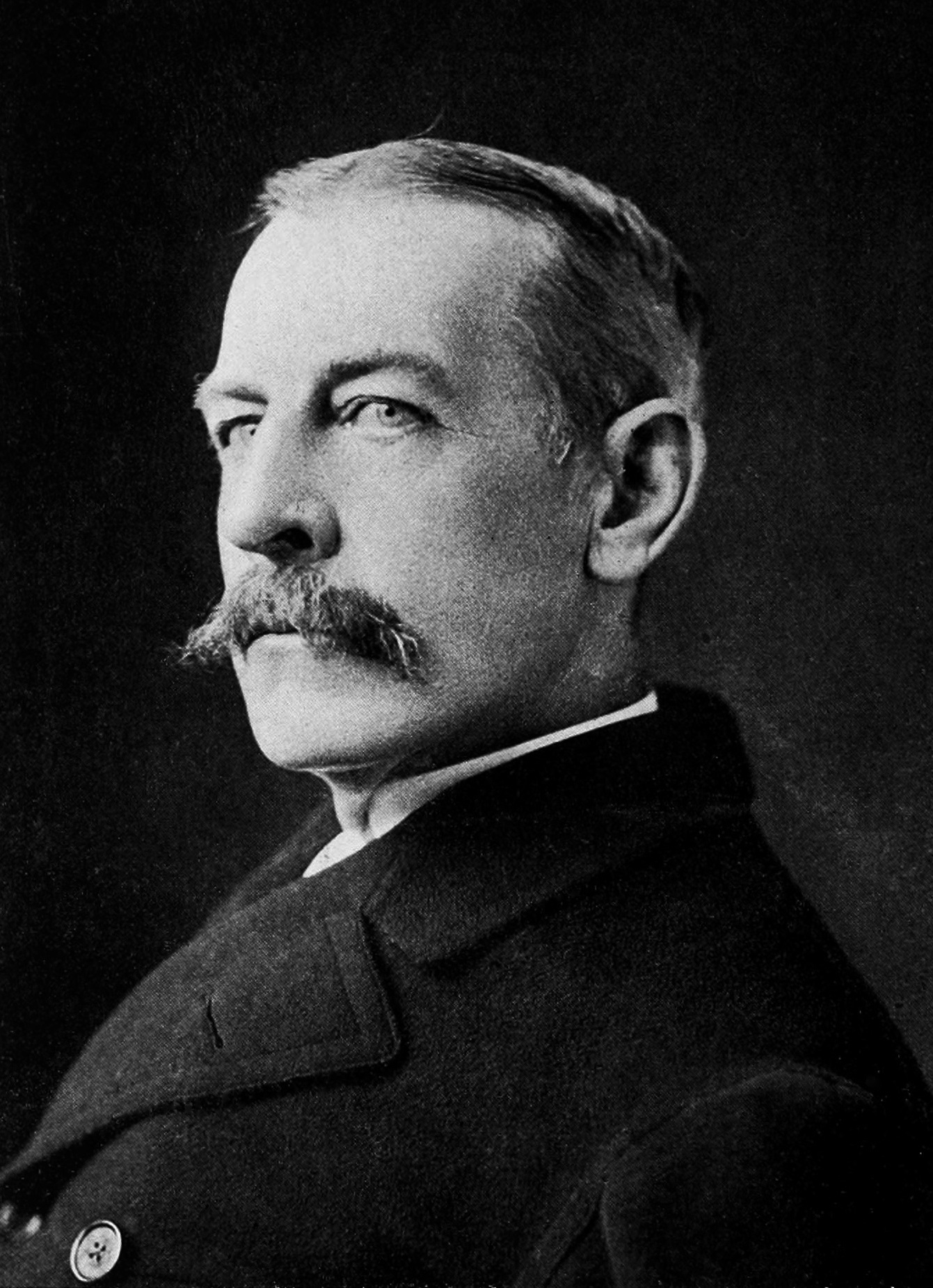
- Born: May 10, 1841; New York City, U.S.
- Died: May 14, 1918 (aged 77); Beaulieu-sur-Mer, Alpes-Maritimes, France
- Education: École polytechnique
- Occupation: Publisher
- Spouse: Baroness de Reuter (m. 1914–1918)
- Parent(s): James Gordon Bennett Sr. Henrietta Agnes Crean
- Relatives: Isaac Bell Jr. (brother-in-law)

James Gordon Bennett Jr. (May 10, 1841 – May 14, 1918) was an American publisher and yachtsman. He was the publisher of the New York Herald, founded by his father, James Gordon Bennett Sr. (1795–1872), who emigrated from Scotland. He was generally known as Gordon Bennett to distinguish him from his father. Among his many sports-related accomplishments he organized both the first polo match and the first tennis match in the United States, and he won the first trans-oceanic yacht race. He sponsored explorers including Henry Morton Stanley's trip to Africa to find David Livingstone, and the ill-fated USS Jeannette attempt on the North Pole.

Bennett's controversial reputation is thought to be the inspiration behind the phrase "Gordon Bennett!", used as an expression of incredulity.

== Early life ==
Bennett was born on May 10, 1841, in New York City to James Gordon Bennett Sr. (1795–1872), the founder, editor and publisher of the New York Herald. He was the only son in the family. He grew up mostly in France, and attended the École polytechnique.

== Career ==
In 1861, he moved to the United States, and enlisted in the Union Navy. In July, 1867, under his father's tutelage, he founded The Evening Telegram, an entertainment and gossip paper that later became the New York World-Telegram. On January 1, 1868, the elder Bennett turned control of the Herald over to him. Bennett raised the paper's profile on the world stage when he provided the financial backing for the 1869 expedition by Henry Morton Stanley into Africa to find David Livingstone in exchange for the Herald having the exclusive account of Stanley's progress.

In 1872, he commissioned a Manhattan building design from Arthur D. Gilman, who popularized Second Empire and cast-iron facades. The building still exists, on Nassau Street. Though he sold it in 1889 and it was greatly expanded over the following five years, it continues to be known as the Bennett Building. It was built on a site previously occupied by the Herald's offices and printing plant, and the Herald later moved back into it. In 1890, he commissioned a new Herald building at Sixth and Broadway, completed in 1895.

In 1880, Bennett established international editions of his newspaper in Paris and London; their successor is the New York Times International Edition, previously known as the International Herald Tribune. In 1883, he partnered with John W. Mackay to found the Commercial Cable Company. It was a successful business and provided an additional large income to Bennett.

== Lifestyle ==
Bennett, like many of his social class, indulged in the "good life": yachts, opulent private railroad cars, and lavish mansions. He was the youngest Commodore ever of the New York Yacht Club. Bennett became Commodore of the N.Y.Y.C in 1870 after Henry G. Stebbins's term, which was from 1863 to 1870.

=== Yachts ===
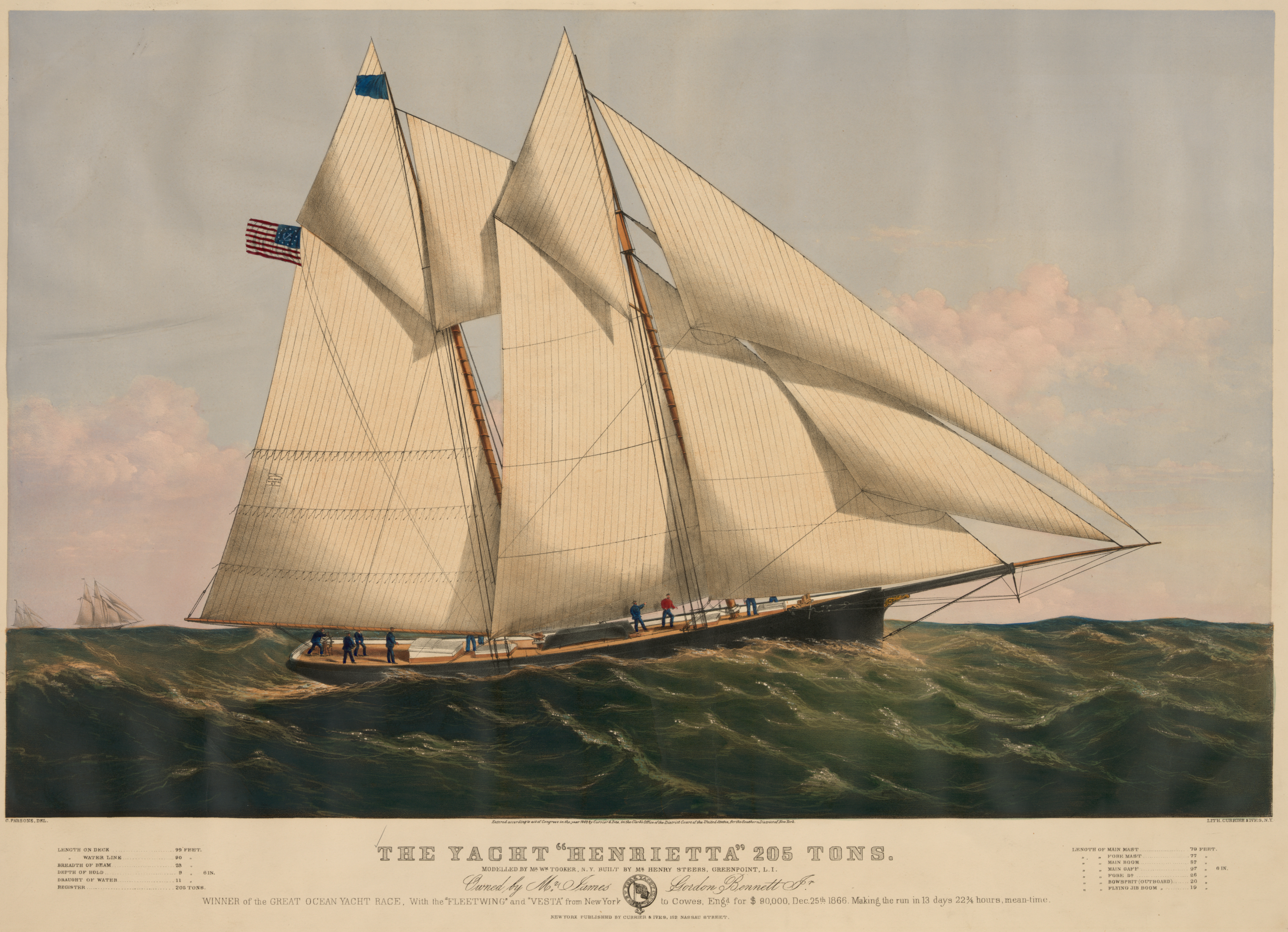
The yacht Henrietta

In 1861, Bennett volunteered his newly built schooner yacht, Henrietta, for the U.S. Revenue Marine Service during the Civil War. At the same time, Bennett was commissioned as a third lieutenant in the Revenue Marine Service (equivalent to an ensign in the U.S. Navy) and assigned to the U.S. Marine Revenue schooner Henrietta (the yacht he had loaned to the U.S. Government) beginning in June 1861. She patrolled Long Island until February 1862 when she was sent to Port Royal, South Carolina. On March 3, 1862, Bennett commanded the Henrietta as part of the fleet which captured Fernandina, Florida. Bennett and the Henrietta returned to civilian life in New York in May 1862.

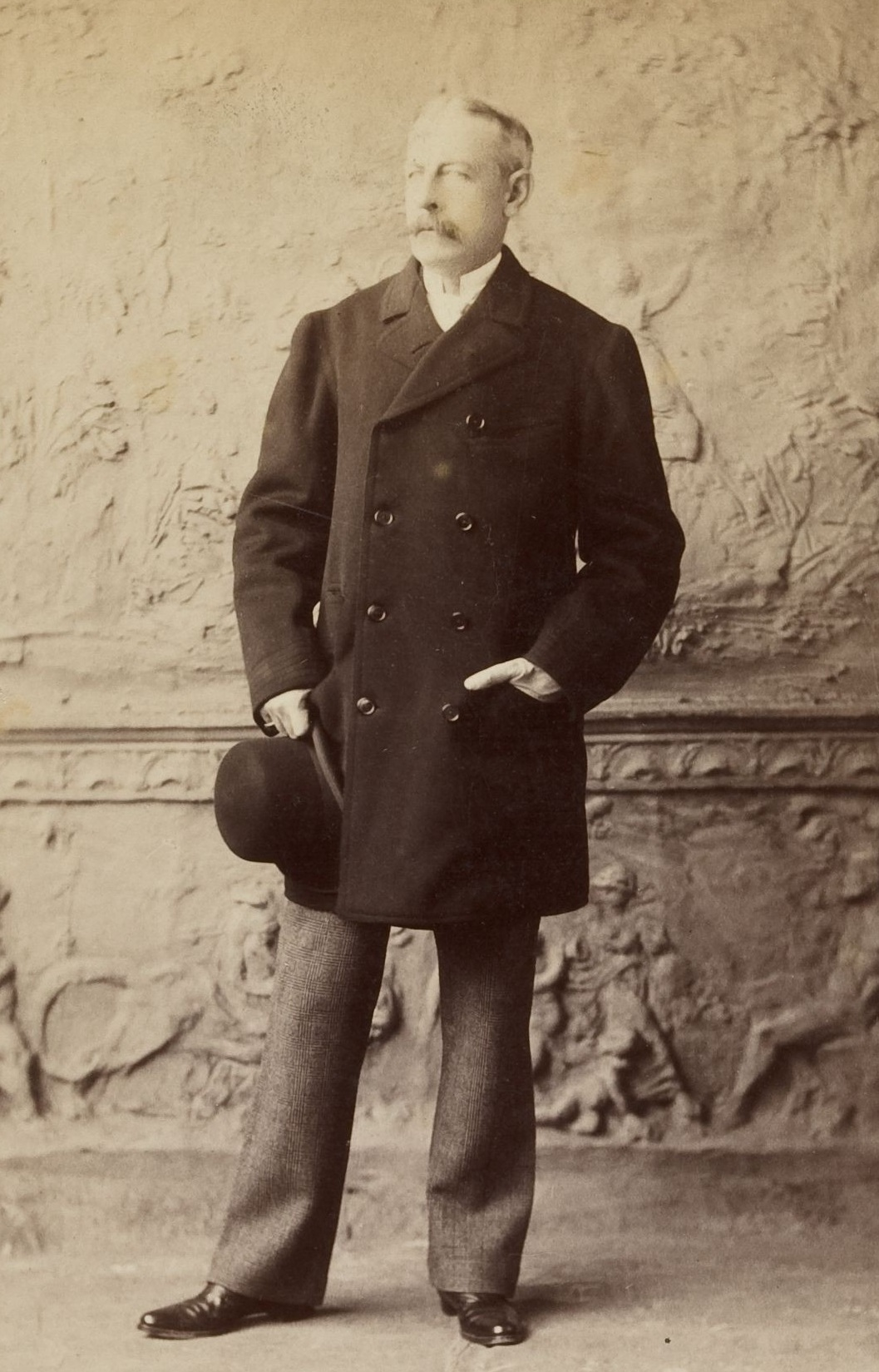
James Gordon Bennett Jr.

In 1866, on a bet, he won the first trans-oceanic yacht race. The race was between three American yachts, the Vesta (owned by Pierre Lorillard IV), the Fleetwing (owned by George and Frank Osgood) and the Henrietta. Each yachtsman put up $30,000 in the winner-take-all wager. They started off in Sandy Hook, New Jersey, on 11 December 1866 amid high westerly winds and raced to The Needles, the furthest westerly point on the Isle of Wight, famous for its lighthouse. Bennett's Henrietta won with a time of 13 days, 21 hours, 55 minutes.

In April 1867, Bennett purchased the yacht L'Hirondelle for $75,000 from Bradford. In May 1867, Bennett refitted the L'Hirondelle and changed her name to the Dauntless. She was rebuilt and rigged as a schooner. Bennett added 23 feet to her length. Her new dimensions were 121 feet long, 25-foot beam and 299 tons.

He entertained guests aboard his steam-yacht "Namouna". American expatriate artist Julius LeBlanc Stewart painted several works set on the yacht.

On May 11, 1870, the pilot boat James Gordon Bennett, No. 6, was launched from the Lawrence & Foulks shipyard at Williamsburg. At the launch and naming ceremony, Katie Chapman, daughter of Captain Daniel C. Chapman, gave the boat the name James Gordon Bennett.

Bennett presented the cup and prizes at the October 14, 1873, New York Yacht Club, Cape May Challenge Cup 140-mile (230 km) regatta, which was a race from Owl's Head Point around to Cape May Lighthouse in New Jersey, and back to Sandy Hook Light.

=== Scandal ===
Bennett often scandalized society with his flamboyant and sometimes erratic behavior. In 1877, he left New York for Europe after an incident that ended his engagement to socialite Caroline May. According to various accounts, he arrived late and drunk to a party at the May family mansion, then urinated into a fireplace (some say grand piano) in full view of his hosts.

Bennett's controversial reputation is thought to have inspired, in Britain, the phrase "Gordon Bennett!" as an expression of incredulity.

=== Move to Paris ===
Settling in Paris, he launched the Paris edition of the New York Herald, named the Paris Herald, the forerunner of the International Herald Tribune. He backed George W. De Long's voyage to the North Pole on the USS Jeannette via the Bering Strait.

The ill-fated expedition led to the deaths from starvation of DeLong and 19 of his crew, a tragedy that increased the paper's circulation. He was a co-founder of the Commercial Cable Company, a venture to break the Transatlantic cable monopoly held by Jay Gould. The 2014 nonfiction book In The Kingdom of Ice written by historian Hampton Sides recounts the voyage and Bennett's role as a financier of the expedition.

=== The Winter Colony at Pau ===
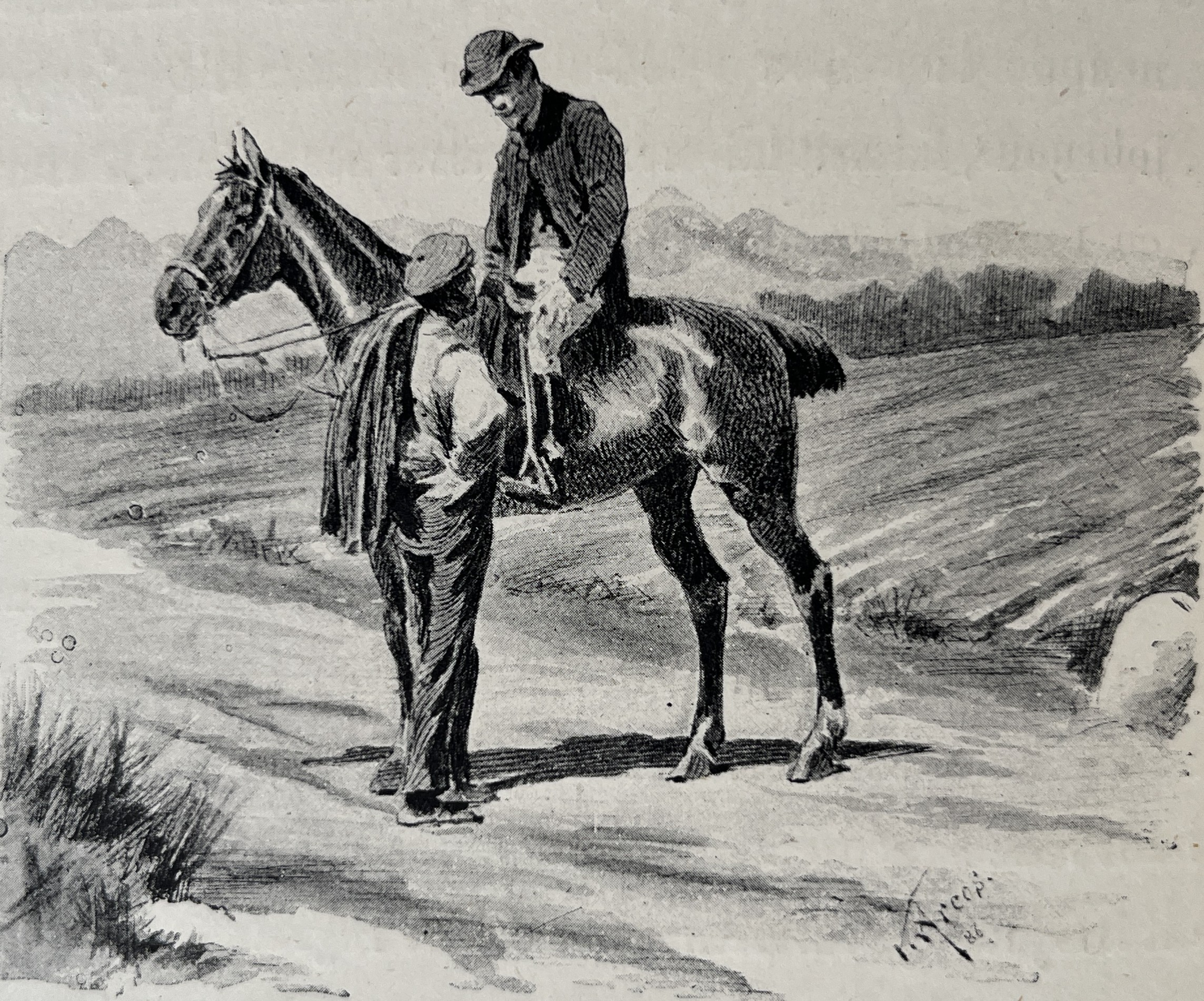
Master of the Pau Hounds, James Gordon Bennett Jr.

The Pau Hunt had been known to be accessible to subscribers with pulmonary diseases, but the difficulty level became exclusionary to less capable riders due to the popularity and frequency of drag hunting plus the hunting of animals that had been captured for release as bagmen. The Count of Bari brought in a private pack of hounds in 1879 and began a competing hunt. The Pau Hunt, claimed Bari had no right to hunt in their territory, but he replied he had no intention to negotiate and would continue the competing hunt during the 1880-1881 season. The Pau Hunt decided to liquidate. At the beginning of the 1880-1881 season, Thomas G. Burgess, the brother of yacht designer Edward Burgess, wrote for the assistance of Bennett, who shortly arrived from Paris. Bennett met first with the mayor followed by the Count of Bari, who gave his hounds to the town hall. On December 2, 1880 with Bennett as Master assisted by Thomas Burgess they formed a private hunt. Bennett purchased 40 hound couples that were delivered in 1881. In 1882, Mayor Nicholas Renault insisted the Pau Hunt be reconstituted to conform with the law, proposing they alternate packs to satisfy the needs of all riding levels. Satisfied, Bennett agreed and gave the new pack to the municipality with Thomas Burgess replacing Bennett as master of the Pau Hounds on 1 November 1882. On 4 April 1881 Bennett launched a mail coach service from the English Club of Pau to Biarritz three times per week driven exclusively by gentlemen coachmen, or "whips", who later formed The Reunion Road Club.

=== Return to the US ===
Bennett returned to the United States and organized the first polo match in the United States at Dickel's Riding Academy at 39th Street and Fifth Avenue in New York. He helped found the Westchester Polo Club in 1876, the first polo club in America. He established the Gordon Bennett Cup for international yachting and the Gordon Bennett Cup for automobile races. In 1906, he funded the Gordon Bennett Cup in ballooning (Coupe Aéronautique Gordon Bennett), which continues to this day. In 1909, Bennett offered a trophy for the fastest speed on a closed circuit for airplanes. The 1909 race in Reims, France was won by Glenn Curtiss for two circuits of a 10 km rectangular course at an average speed of 46.5 miles per hour (74.8 km/h). From 1896 to 1914, the champion of Paris, USFSA football (soccer), received a trophy offered by Gordon Bennett.

== Personal life and death ==
Bennett did not marry until he was 73. His wife was Maud Potter, widow of George de Reuter, son of Julius Paul Reuter, founder of Reuters news agency.

Bennett spent the winter of 1917 in his villa in Beaulieu-sur-Mer, France. He contracted influenza while visiting a hospital in Paris and travelled to southern France. He died the morning of May 14, 1918 of pneumonia in Beaulieu-sur-Mer after having been in a coma for two days. Bennett is buried at the Cimetière de Passy in Paris.

James Stillman was an intimate friend of James O. Bloss and John William Sterling. After the death of Bennett it was learned by the administrators of his estate that he had appointed Stillman one of the administrators and trustees. Stillman had little or no opportunity to act under the authority of Bennett's will, as he died nearly two months before Bennett's death. Stillman named Sterling one of his executors. Sterling could hardly have begun his duties under Stillman's will when he too died a few months later. The Bennett estate, the Stillman estate and the Sterling estate totaled about $76,000,000. After Sterling's death it was learned that he had appointed his long time intimate companion, Bloss, one of the executors. Six months after Sterling's death, Bloss died.

== Honors ==
Asteroid 305 Gordonia is named after him. He also has a street named for him near Chopin Airport in Warsaw, Poland. The Avenue Gordon Bennett in Paris, where the French Open's Stade de Roland Garros is sited is named after his father.

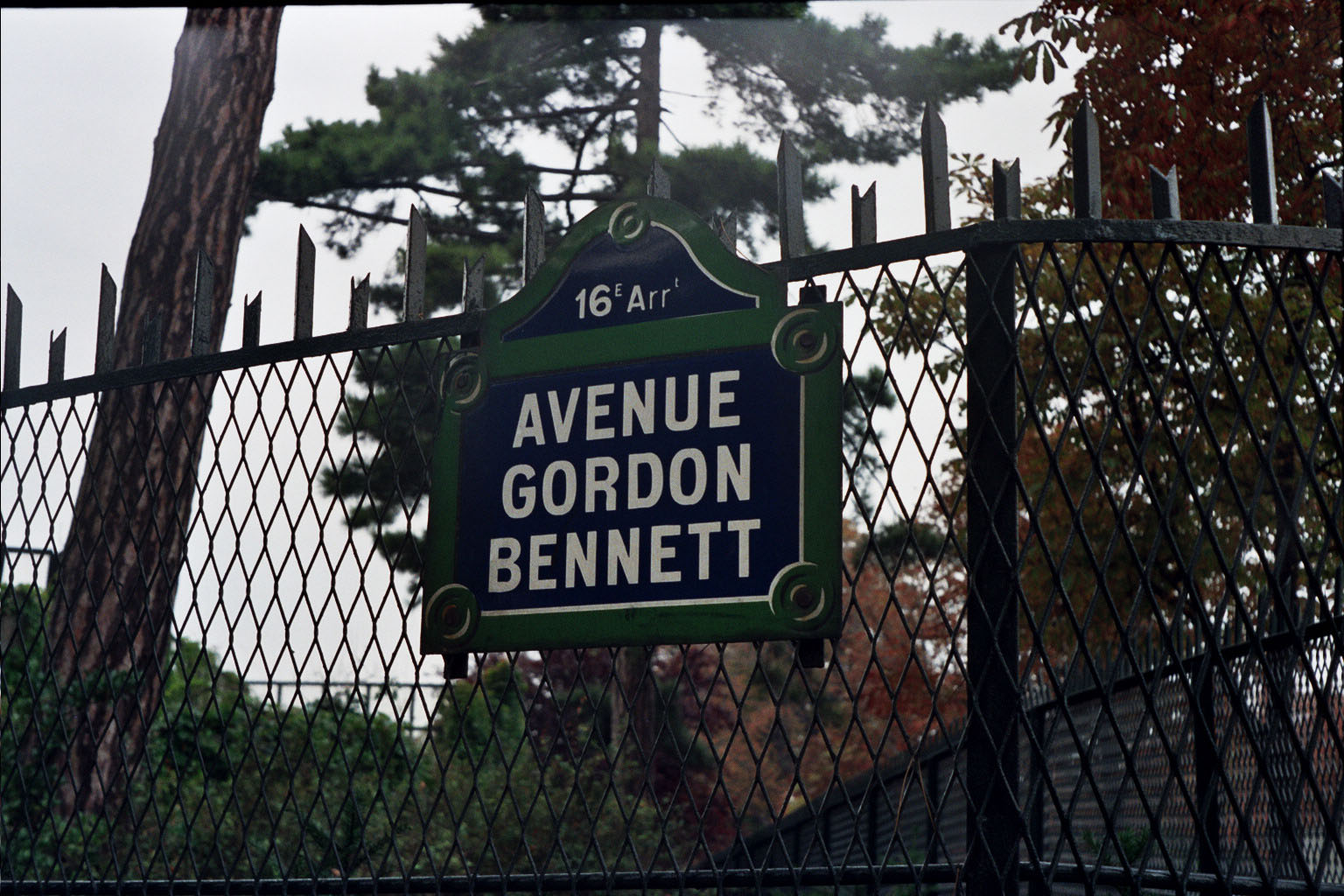
Avenue Gordon Bennett near the Stade Roland Garros in Paris

Bennett, British Columbia, now a ghost town, as well as nearby Bennett Lake and Bennett Peak are named for him, as is Bennett Island, discovered during the Jeannette expedition.

== Gallery ==
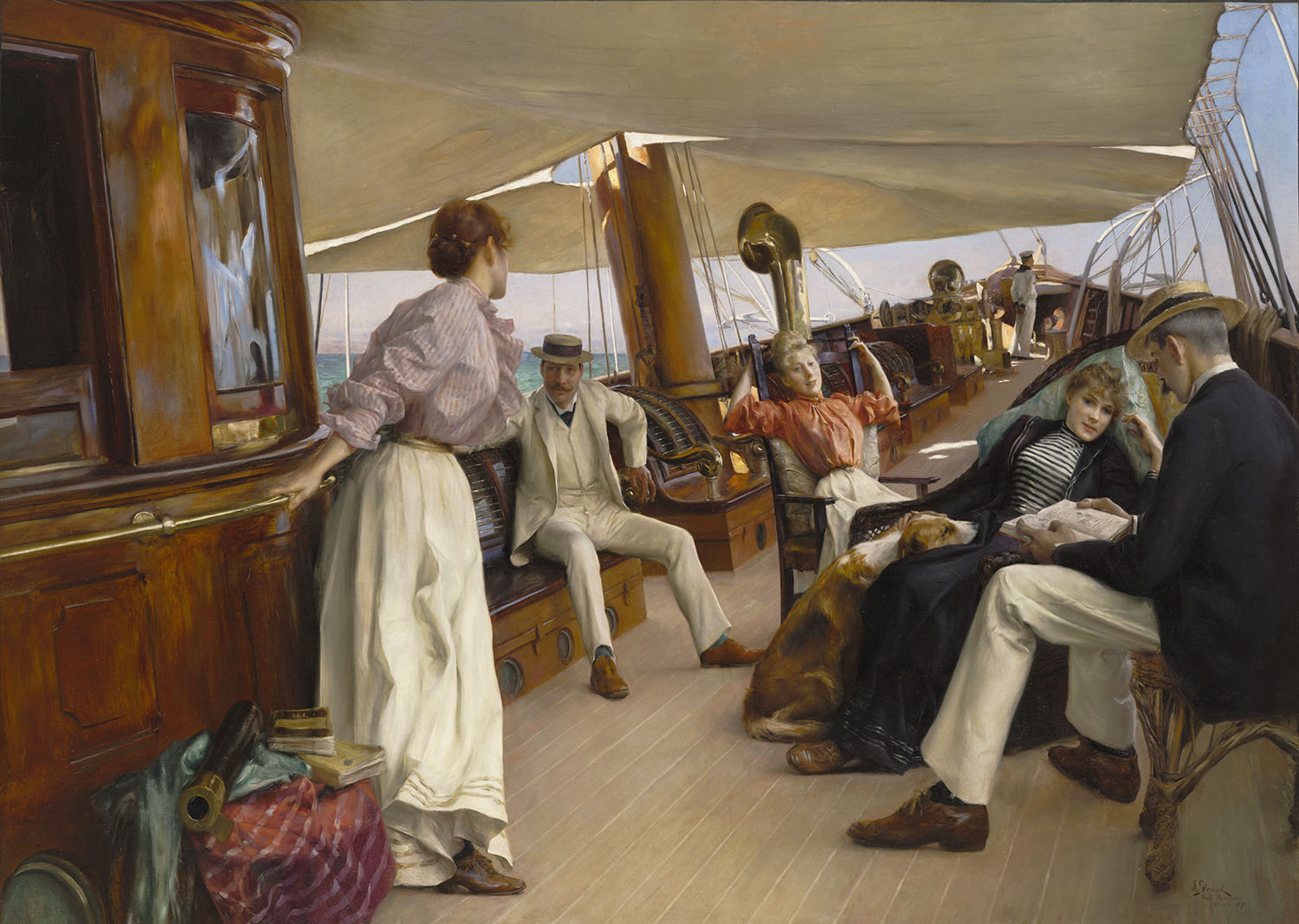
On the Yacht "Namouna", Venice, by Stewart. Bennett is center left, in the white suit. Lillie Langtry is the woman seated, right (1890).

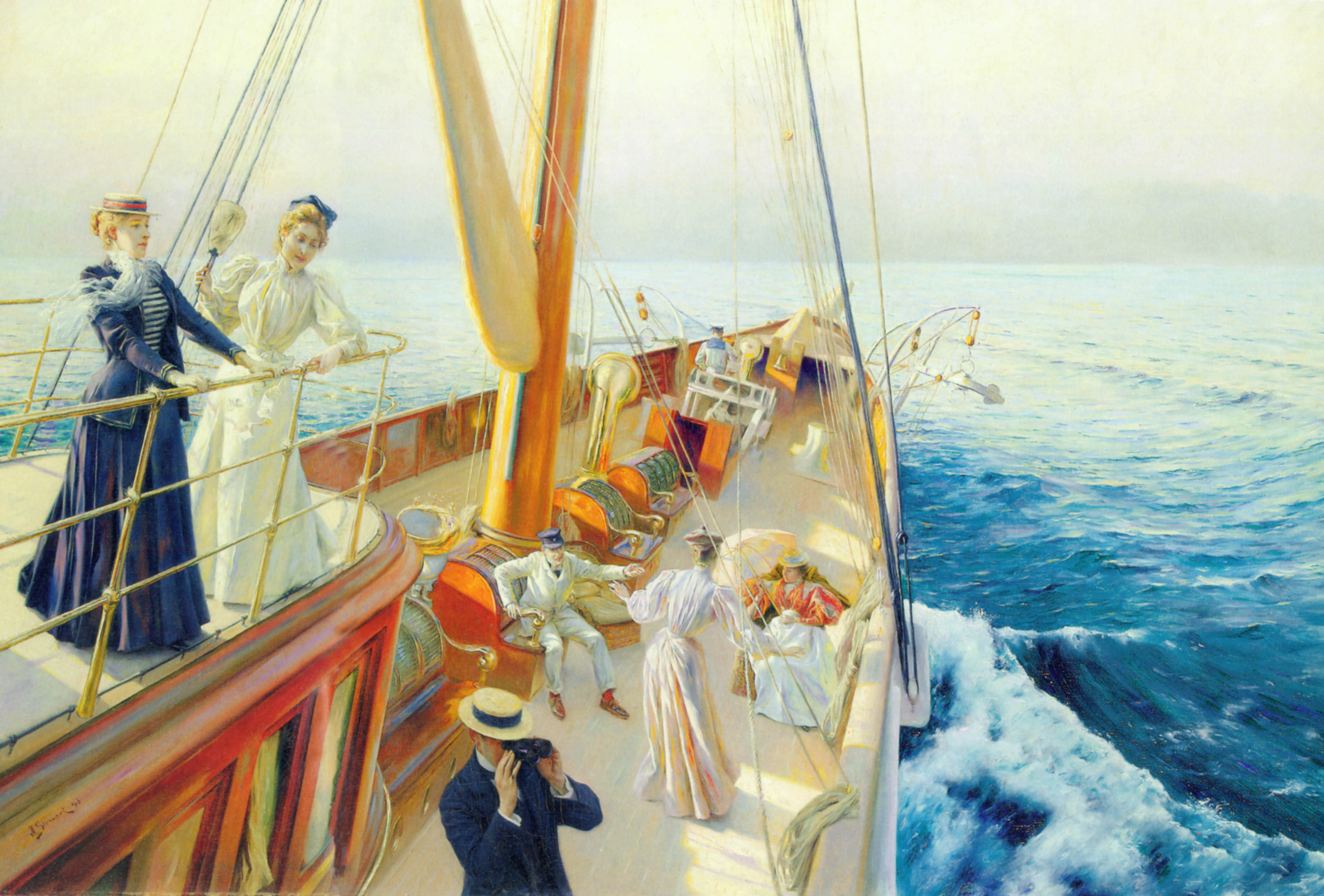
Yachting on the Mediterranean, by Stewart (1896)

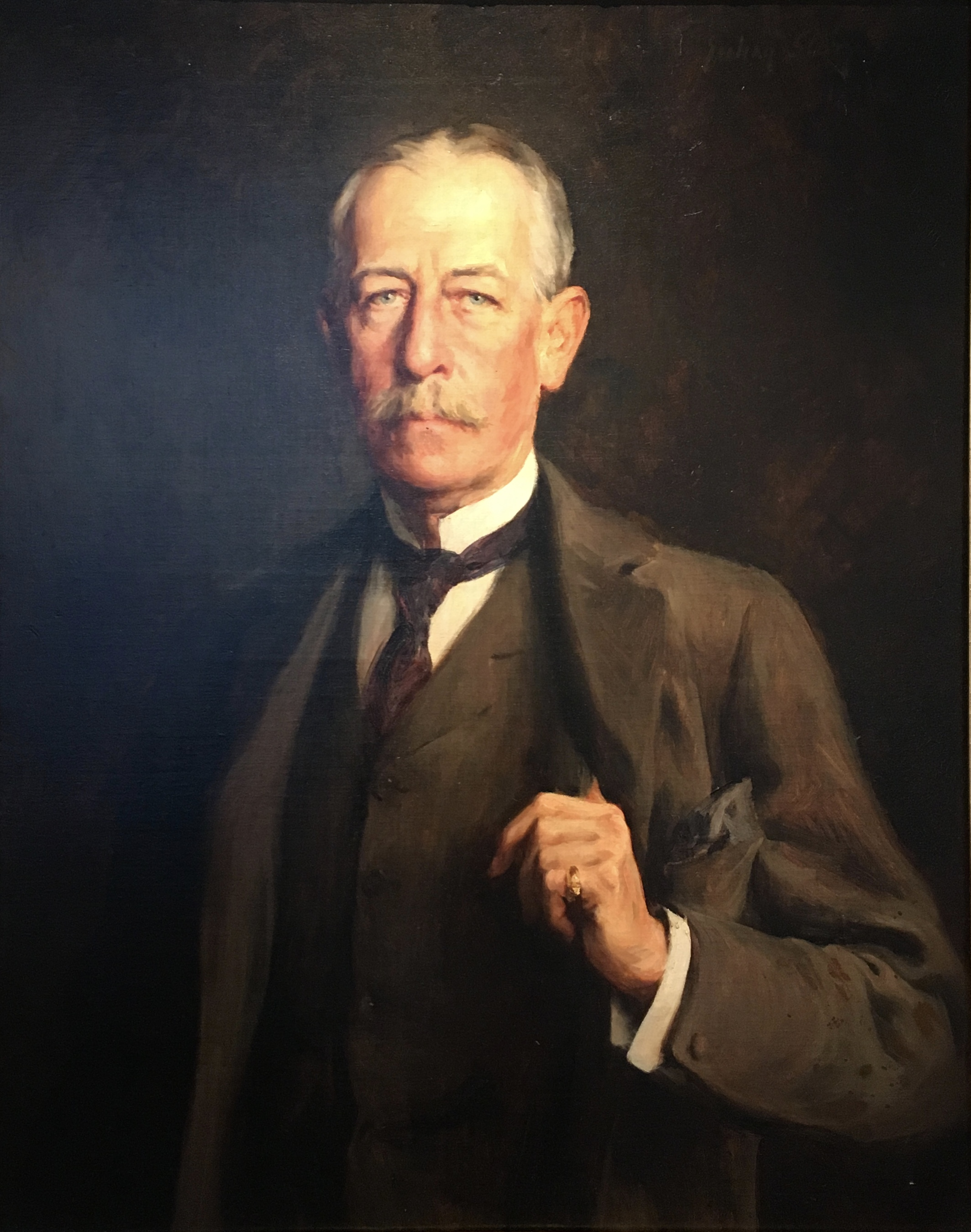
Bennett as painted by Julian Story (1904)

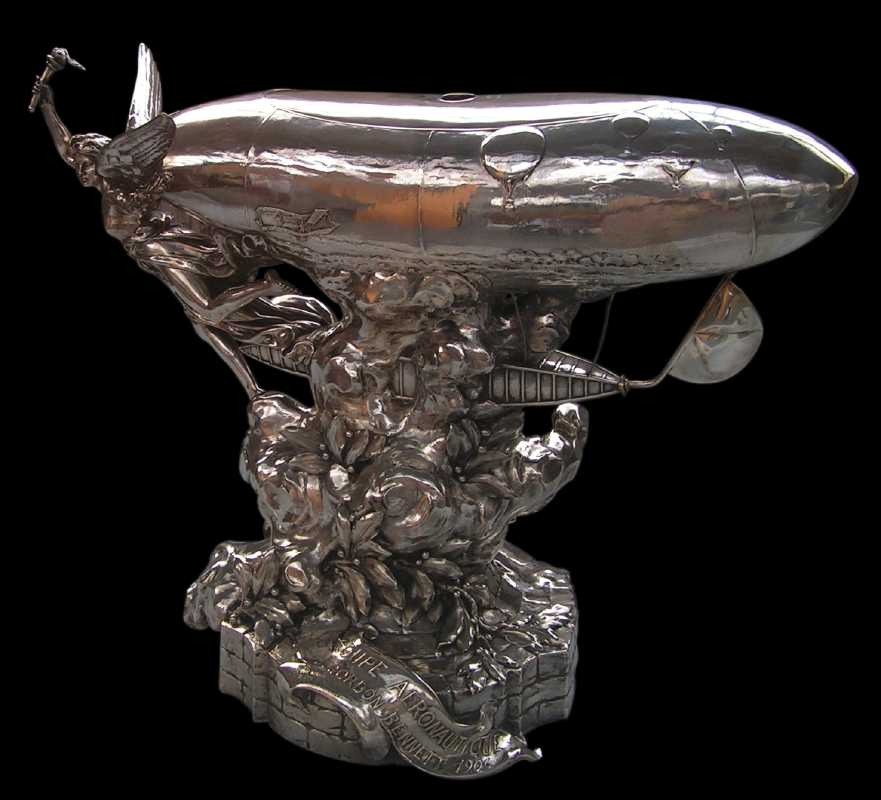
The 1906 Gordon Bennett Cup in Ballooning (1906)

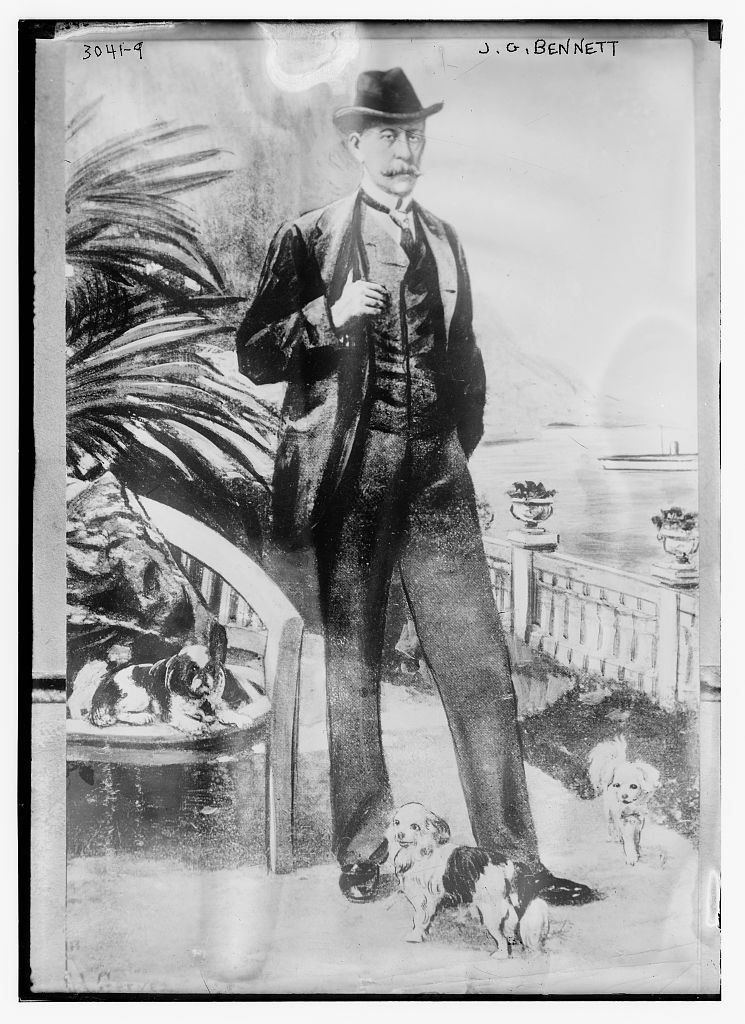
Bennett (c. 1910–1915)
