= James Gordon Bennett Sr. =

Scottish-born American businessman (1795–1872)

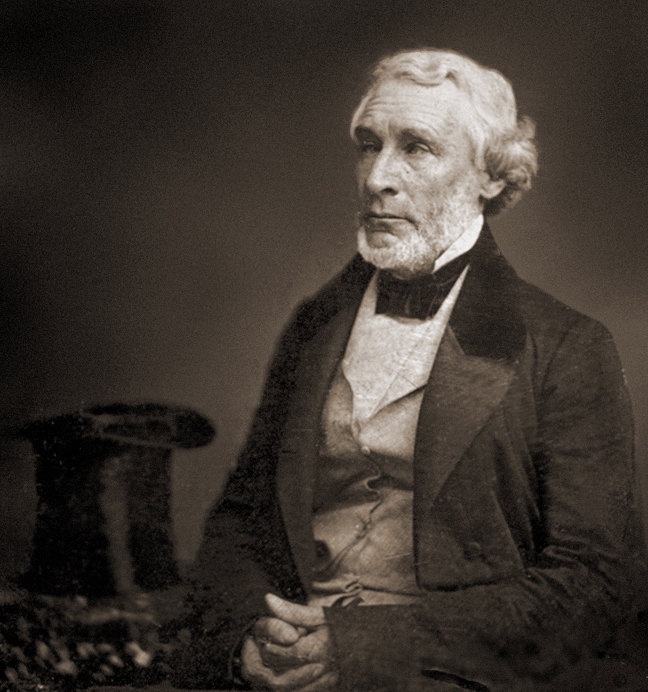
- Bennett, c. 1851
- Born: September 1, 1795; Newmill, Banffshire, Scotland, UK
- Died: June 1, 1872 (aged 76); New York, New York, U.S.
- Occupation: Publisher
- Known for: Founder of New York Herald
- Spouse: Henrietta Agnes Crean (m. 1840)
- Children: 3, including James Jr.

James Gordon Bennett Sr. (September 1, 1795 – June 1, 1872) was a British-born American businessman who was the founder, editor and publisher of the New York Herald and a major figure in the history of American newspapers.

== Early life ==
Bennett was born to a prosperous Christian Roman Catholic family in Buckie, Banffshire, Scotland. At age 15, Bennett entered the Roman Catholic seminary in Blairs, Aberdeenshire, where he remained for four years. After leaving the seminary, he read voraciously on his own and traveled throughout Scotland.

In 1819, he joined a friend who was sailing to North America. After four weeks they landed in Halifax, Nova Scotia, where Bennett briefly worked as a schoolmaster till he had enough money to sail south to Portland, Maine, where he again taught a school in the village of Addison, later moving on to Boston, Massachusetts, by New Year's Day, 1820.

He worked in New England as a proofreader and bookseller before the Charleston Courier in Charleston, South Carolina, hired him to translate Spanish language news reports, so he briefly relocated to the South. He moved back north to New York City in 1823, where he worked first as a freelance paper writer and, then, assistant editor of the New York Courier and Enquirer, one of the oldest newspapers in the city.

== New York Herald ==
In May 1835, Bennett began the New York Herald after years of failing to start a paper. After only a year of publication, in April 1836, it shocked readers with front-page coverage of the grisly murder of the prostitute Helen Jewett. Bennett got a scoop and conducted the first-ever newspaper interview for it. In business and circulation policy, The Herald initiated a cash-in-advance policy for advertisers, which later became the industry standard. Bennett was also at the forefront of using the latest technology to gather and report the news, and added pictorial illustrations produced from woodcuts. In 1839, Bennett was granted the first ever exclusive interview to a sitting President of the United States, the eighth occupant, Martin Van Buren (lived 1782–1862, served 1837–1841).

=== Endorsements ===
The Herald was officially independent in its politics but endorsed for president William Henry Harrison (1840), James K. Polk (1844), Zachary Taylor (1848), Franklin Pierce (1852), and John C. Frémont (1856). The author Garry Boulard speculates that Bennett ultimately turned against Pierce for not appointing him to a much-coveted post as American minister plenipotentiary (later called ambassador) to France. From then on, Bennett consistently lambasted Pierce on both his front and editorial page and often called him "Poor Pierce". Bennett supported James Buchanan of Pennsylvania, a Democrat and Secretary of State under Polk, in the 1856 election as tensions rose between the sections and states over slavery and states' rights and reached a critical point during the 1850s, after the controversial Compromise of 1850. Under Bennett's leadership, the New York Herald adopted a proslavery position, as he argued that the Compromise of 1850 would lead to "but little anxiety entertained in relation to the question of slavery, the public mind will be so fatigued that it will be disinclined to think of the matter any further."

He later endorsed Southern Democrat and incumbent Vice President John C. Breckinridge (lived 1821–1875, served 1857–1861), of Kentucky under Buchanan for the 1860 presidential campaign and shifted to John Bell (1796–1869), of Tennessee running as a Constitutional Unionist among the four presidential candidates in the confused but pivotal general election in November 1860. In the midst of the following Civil War (1861–1865), he promoted former Union Army General-in-Chief George B. McClellan (1826–1885), nominated from the Democratic Party in the 1864 election, campaigning for a negotiated peace with the South against a second term for wartime 16th President Abraham Lincoln (lived 1809–1865, served 1861–1865), but the paper itself endorsed no candidate for the unusual war election of 1864.

Although he generally opposed the Republican Lincoln, Bennett still backed the Northern cause for the Union and took the lead to turn the Republican war president into a martyr after his April 14, 1865 assassination at Ford's Theater in Washington. He favored most of successor 17th President Andrew Johnson (lived 1808–1875, served 1865–1869), former Vice President for one month in Lincoln's brief second term, a War Democrat, former U.S. Senator and loyal wartime Governor of Tennessee, and his following moderate Reconstruction Era policies and proposals towards the defeated South, following what was thought would have been Lincoln's gentle hand had he lived.

=== Later career ===
By the time Bennett turned control of the New York Herald over to his son James Gordon Bennett Jr. (1841–1918) in 1866, it had the highest circulation in America but would soon face increasing competition from Horace Greeley's New York Tribune and soon in the next decades, from Joseph Pulitzer's New York World, William Randolph Hearst's New York Journal, and Henry Jarvis Raymond's The New York Times.

However, under the younger Bennett's stewardship, the Herald slowly declined under the increasingly stiff competition and changing technologies in the late 19th century. The paper was merged with its former archrival, the New York Tribune in 1924, six years after the younger Bennett's death, becoming the New York Herald Tribune for another 42 years. It enjoyed considerable success and a high reputation, but declined in the 1950s and 1960s. The Herald Tribune merged with the New York World-Telegram and The Sun and the New York Journal-American in 1966 to become the New York World Journal Tribune, which folded in 1967.

== Personal life ==
On June 6, 1840 Bennett married Henrietta Agnes Crean in New York. They had three children, including:

- James Gordon Bennett, Jr. (1841–1918)
- Jeanette Gordon Bennett (d. 1936), who married Isaac Bell Jr. (1846–1889)

== Death ==
Bennett died in Manhattan, New York City, on June 1, 1872. This was five months before his rival / competitor Horace Greeley also succumbed to illness, after Greeley's disastrous presidential election campaign of 1872. Bennett was interred at Green-Wood Cemetery in Brooklyn, New York City.

=== Legacy ===
Bennett and the Herald used racist language, advocated for Southern secession, attacked Lincoln for trying to keep the Union together and generally opposed the American Civil War. In June 1863 the Herald supported a mass anti-war rally in New York City where the war was denounced as an unconstitutional crusade that would lead to freed Blacks flooding North and competing for white jobs.

Bennett endowed the New York City Fire Department's highest honor for bravery in 1869 after his home was saved from destruction by firefighters. It remained one of the department's highest honors for 150 years. The City renamed it on September 7, 2020, after Chief Peter J. Ganci to honor him as the highest-ranking member of the department killed during the terrorist attack on the World Trade Center on September 11, 2001.

According to The New York Times, Bennett's racism has been called out for years by the Vulcan Society, a fraternal order of Black firefighters.

According to historian Robert C. Bannister, Bennett was:

A gifted and controversial editor. Bennett transformed the American newspaper. Expanding traditional coverage, the Herald provided sports reports, a society page, and advice to the lovelorn, soon permanent features of most metropolitan dailies. Bennett covered murders and sex scandals and delicious detail, faking materials when necessary.... His adroit use of telegraph, pony express, and even offshore ships to intercept European dispatches set high standards for rapid news gathering.

Bannister also argues Bennett was a leading crusader in American election campaigns in the 19th century:

"Combining opportunism and reform, Bennett exposed fraud on Wall Street, attacked the Bank of the United States, and generally joined the Jacksonian assault on privilege. Reflecting a growing nativism, he published excerpts from the anti-catholic disclosures of "Maria Monk", and he greeted Know-Nothingism cordially. Defending labor unions in principle, he assailed much union activity. Unable to condemn slavery outright, he opposed abolitionism."

Bennett reportedly had strabismus for most of his life; an acquaintance once said that he was "so terribly cross-eyed that when he looked at me with one eye, he looked out at the City Hall with the other."

The James Gordon Bennett Memorial, dedicated to Bennett and his son and successor at the Herald, stands in Herald Square at 35th Street & 6th Avenue in midtown Manhattan. Bennett Park, named for Bennett, occupies the space between Fort Washington and Pinehurst avenues and W. 183rd and 185th streets in northern Manhattan.

The Avenue Gordon Bennett in Paris, France with Stade de Roland Garros, site of the French Open tennis tournament, is also named after Bennett, possibly thanks to his son.

Bennett's account of the infamous 1836 Helen Jewett murder in the Herald was selected by The Library of America for inclusion in the 2008 anthology titled True Crime.

== Notes ==
Notes

Sources

- Boulard, Garry. "The Expatriation of Frankin Pierce," Bloomington: iUniverse, 2006.
- Carlson, Oliver. The Man Who Made News: James Gordon Bennett. New York: Duell, Sloan and Pearce, 1942
- Crouthamel, James L. Bennett's New York Herald and the Rise of the Popular Press. Syracuse, NY: Syracuse University Press, 1989 Online
