= Barber (surname) =

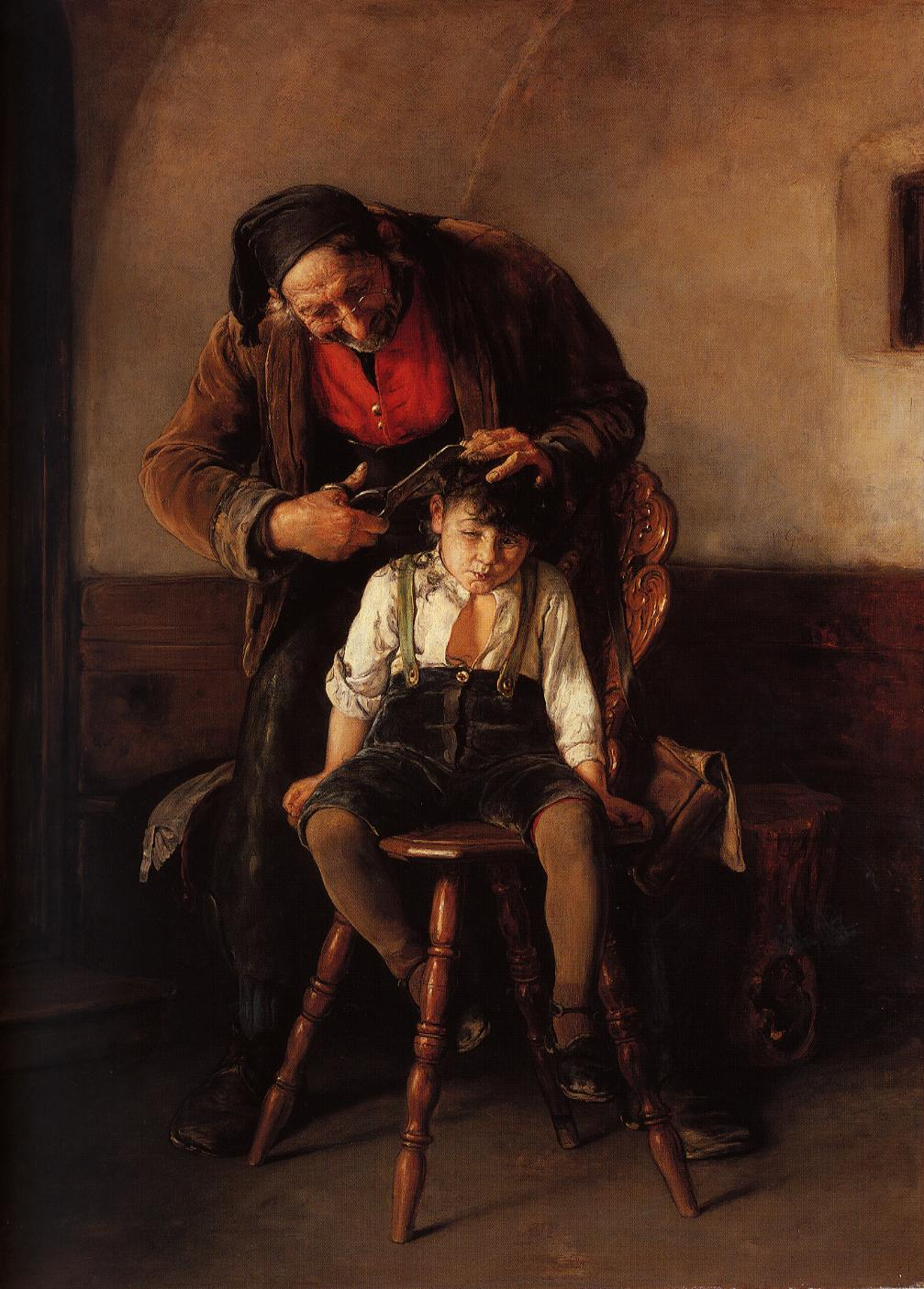
- The barber, by Nikolaos Gyzis (1880)
- Language: English

Origin
- Meaning: Relating to the profession of Barber

Other names
- Related names: Barbieri (Italian); Barbero (Italian and Spanish); Barbeiro (Portuguese); Barbier (French)

Barber is an English, Norman French and Catalan surname. Related names include: Barbieri (Italian), Barbero (Italian and Spanish), Barbeiro (Portuguese), Barbier (French). Barbiero (Italian), Barberis (Italian) and Barberopoulou (Greek) are also related. Notable people with the surname include:

== A ==
- A. B. Barber (1883–1961), American Army colonel
- Adrian Barber (1938–2020), British musician/producer
- Aja Barber, American fashion activist and writer
- Alan Barber (1905–1985), English amateur first-class cricketer
- Alden G. Barber (1919–2003), Boy Scouts of America figure
- Aleesha Barber (born 1987), Trinidadian sprint hurdler
- Alf Barber (1902–1967), British boxer
- Allison Barber, American university chancellor
- Amos W. Barber (1861–1915), American surgeon and politician
- Amzi L. Barber (1843–1909), American pioneer of the asphalt industry
- Andrea Barber (born 1976), American actress
- Anthony Barber, Baron Barber (1920–2005), British cabinet minister
- Anthony Cat Barber (born 1994), American basketball player
- Anthony Barber (boxer) (1939–2004), Australian boxer
- Antonia Barber (1932–2019), English author
- Arthur Barber (1898 – after 1925), English cricketer
- Augustus Barber (1927–2008), American businessman and founder of Barber Foods
- Austin Barber (born 2003), American football player
- Ava Barber (born 1954), American country music singer and performer

== B ==
- Ben Barber (born 1984), Australian actor
- Benjamin Barber (1939–2017), American political scientist
- Bill Barber (born 1952), Canadian hockey player
- Bill Barber (musician) (1920–2007), jazz musician
- Billy Barber (musician), American keyboardist and composer
- Bob Barber (disambiguation)
- Bobby Barber (1894–1976), American character actor
- Brian Barber (born 1973), baseball starting pitcher
- Sir Brendan Barber (born 1951), General Secretary of the Trades Union Congress, United Kingdom
- Bruce Barber (born 1950), New Zealand-born artist, writer, curator and educator
- Bryan Barber (born 1970), American music video and motion picture director

== C ==
- Carl Barber (born 1956), Canadian Haskap berry grower
- Celeste Barber, Australian comedian and journalist
- Catharine Webb Barber (1823–?), American newspaper editor, author
- Charles Barber (disambiguation)
- Charlie Barber (1854–1910), American baseball player
- Chris or Christopher Barber (disambiguation)
- Clare Barber, Manx politician
- Clarence Barber (1917–2004), Canadian economist and academic
- Colin Barber (baseball) (born 2000), American baseball player
- Colin Muir Barber (1897–1964), British general
- Corey Barber Jr. (born 2008), American football player

== D ==
- Dan Barber (born 1969), American chef and restaurant owner
- Daniel Barber (disambiguation)
- Danny Barber (soccer) (born 1971), American soccer player
- Danny Barber (serial killer) (1955–1999), American serial killer
- Darren Barber (born 1968), Canadian rower
- David Barber (disambiguation)
- Del Barber (born 1983), Canadian country singer
- Derek Barber, Baron Barber of Tewkesbury (1918–2017), agricultural expert
- Dick Barber (1910–1983), American long jumper
- Dominic Barber (1955–2003), English theatre director
- Dominique Barber (born 1986), American football player
- Don Barber (born 1964), Canadian-born ice hockey player
- Donn Barber (1871–1925), American architect
- Douglas Barber, Canadian businessman
- Deshauna Barber (born 1989), winner of Miss USA pageant and US military member.

== E ==
- Edward Barber (disambiguation)
- Edwin Atlee Barber (1851–1916), American archeologist and author
- Elizabeth Blair Barber (1909–2001), Australian artist
- Elizabeth Wayland Barber, American author, expert on textiles, professor emerita of archaeology and linguistics
- Eric Barber (disambiguation)
- Ernie Barber (American football) (1914–1989), American football player
- Ernie Barber (Australian footballer) (1895–1972), Australian rules footballer
- Eunice Barber (born 1974), Sierra Leonean athlete

== F ==
- Forest Barber (born 1952), American racing driver
- Frances Barber (born 1958), English actress
- Francis Barber (c. 1735–1801), Jamaican manservant of Samuel Johnson from 1752 until Johnson's death in 1784
- Francis Barber (Colonel) (1750–1783), colonel in the Continental Army during the American Revolutionary War
- Fred Barber (born 1963), English soccer player
- Frederick Barber (cricketer) (1887–1943), English cricketer

== G ==
- Gary Barber (born 1957), chairman and CEO of Metro-Goldwyn-Mayer, film producer and co-founder of Spyglass Entertainment
- George Barber (disambiguation)
- Gillian Barber (born 1958), English-born Canadian actress
- Glenn Barber (1935–2008), American country and rockabilly performer
- Glynis Barber (born 1955), British actress
- Graham Barber (born 1958), English soccer referee
- Greg Barber (born 1966), Australian politician

== H ==
- Hamish Barber (1933–2007), Scottish doctor
- Harold Wordsworth Barber (1887–1955), English dermatologist
- Harriet Barber (1968–2014), English figurative painter
- Harry James Barber (1875–1959), Canadian politician
- Herbert G. Barber (1870–1947), American attorney and politician
- Herbert Spencer Barber (1882–1950), American entomologist
- Henry Barber (disambiguation)
- Hilia Barber, Bissau-Guinean politician
- Hiram Barber (1800–1888), American politician, pioneer and businessman
- Hiram Barber Jr. (1835–1924), American politician
- Homer G. Barber (1830–1909), American politician
- Horatio Barber (1875–1964), British aviation pioneer
- Horatio Barber (cricketer) (1843–1869), English cricketer
- Howard Barber (1877–1950), English-born Australian politician

== I ==
- Ida Barber (1842–1931), German writer
- Irén Barbér (Irena Barber) (1939–2006), Slovene author, journalist and notary in Hungary
- Irving K. Barber (1923–2012), Canadian forest industrialist and philanthropist
- Isaac Ambrose Barber (1852–1909), American politician

== J ==
- J. Allen Barber (1809–1881), American politician
- Jack Barber (1901–1961), English footballer
- James Barber (disambiguation)
- Jamie Barber (born 1971), British restaurateur
- Janette Barber (born 1953), American stand-up comic, television producer and writer
- Jason Barber (born 1966), English farmer
- Jenni Barber (born 1983), American actress
- Jerry Barber (1916–1994), American professional golfer
- Jesse Barber (1888–1959), American baseball player
- Jesse Max Barber (1878–1949), African-American journalist, teacher and dentist
- Jill Barber (born 1980), Canadian singer-songwriter
- Jim Barber (American football) (1912–1998), American football player
- Jim Barber (ventriloquist), American ventriloquist, comedian and singer
- Joel Barber (1876–1952), American architect
- John Barber (disambiguation)
- José María Chiquillo Barber (born 1964), Spanish politician
- Joseph Barber (1757–1811), English landscape painter and art teacher
- Joseph L. Barber (1864–1940), American politician
- Joshua Barber (born 1977), American artist
- Josiah Barber (1771–1842), first mayor of Ohio City, Ohio, United States

== K ==
- Karen Barber (born 1961), English ice dancer
- Karin Barber (born 1949), British anthropologist and academic
- Kate Barber (born 1976), American field hockey player
- Kantroy Barber (born 1973), American football player
- Katherine Barber (1959–2021), Canadian lexicographer
- Keith Barber (disambiguation)
- Kimberly Barber (born 1959), Canadian mezzo-soprano and vocal pedagogue
- Kris Barber, Canadian ice dancer
- Kurt Barber (born 1969), American football player and coach

== L ==
- Laird Howard Barber (1848–1928), American politician
- Lakia Aisha Barber (born 1987), American basketball player
- Lance Barber (born 1973), American actor
- Leeonzer Barber (born 1966), American boxer
- Leila Cook Barber (1903–1984) American art historian and professor emeritus
- Len Barber (1929–1988), English soccer player
- Lesley Barber (born 1968), Canadian composer
- Levi Barber (1777–1833), American surveyor, court administrator, banker and legislator
- Lionel Barber (born 1955), English journalist
- Lloyd Barber (1932–2011), Canadian university administrator
- Lucius Israel Barber (1806–1899), American politician
- Lynn Barber (born 1944), British journalist
- Lynn Barber (make-up artist), American make-up artist

== M ==
- Malcolm Barber (born 1943), British scholar of medieval history
- Margaret Barber (1869–1901), English Christian writer
- Margaret E. Barber (1866–1930), English missionary in China
- Marion Barber Jr. (born 1959), American football player
- Marion Barber III (1983–2022), American football player
- Matthew Barber (singer-songwriter) (born 1977), Canadian singer-songwriter
- Mark Barber (1915–1975), American football player
- Mary Barber (disambiguation)
- Matt Barber (actor) (born 1983), English actor
- Me'Lisa Barber (born 1980), American track and field sprint athlete
- Merrill P. Barber (1910–1985), American politician
- Mike or Michael Barber (disambiguation)
- Mikele Barber (born 1980), American track and field sprint athlete
- Miller Barber (1931–2013), American golfer

== N ==
- Nicole Barber-Lane (born 1970), English actress
- Noel Barber (1909–1988), British novelist and journalist
- Nola Barber (1901–1985), Australian mayor and community worker
- Noyes Barber (1781–1844), American politician

== O ==
- O. C. Barber (1841–1920), American businessman, industrialist and philanthropist
- Orion M. Barber (1857–1930), American politician

== P ==
- Patricia Barber (born 1956), American jazz singer
- Paul Barber (disambiguation)
- Pauline Gardiner Barber, Canadian social anthropologist
- Peter Barber (architect) (born 1960), British modernist architect
- Peter J. Barber (1830–1905), American architect and mayor of Santa Barbara, California
- Peyton Barber (born 1994), American football player
- Phil Barber (born 1965), English soccer player
- Polly Barber (1803–1898), Canadian teacher, farmer and businesswoman

== R ==
- Ray Barber (singer) (1923–2009), singer
- Red Barber (1908–1992), American sports broadcaster
- Richard Barber (disambiguation)
- Ricky Barber (born 2001), American football player
- Riley Barber (born 1994), American ice hockey player
- Rina Foygel Barber, American statistician
- Ron Barber (born 1945), American politician
- Ronde Barber (born 1975), American football player, twin brother of Tiki Barber
- Russell Barber (1911–1996), American curler

== S ==
- Sam or Samuel Barber (disambiguation)
  - Samuel Barber (1910–1981), American composer
- Shawn Barber (American football) (born 1975), American football player
- Shawn Barber (pole vaulter) (1994–2024), Canadian pole vaulter
- Skip Barber (born 1936), American Formula One driver
- Steve Barber (1938–2007), American professional baseball player
- Steve Barber (right-handed pitcher) (born 1948), American baseball player

== T ==
- Theodore X. Barber (1927–2005), American psychologist
- Thomas Barber (disambiguation)
- Tiki Barber (born 1975), American football player, twin brother of Ronde Barber
- Tommy Barber (1886–1925), English footballer
- Trevor Barber (1925–2015), New Zealand cricketer

== V ==
- Vincent Barber (1788–1838), English landscape painter and art teacher

== W ==
- Whitman A. Barber (1853–1930), American politician
- William Barber (disambiguation)

== Fictional characters ==
- Barber/Winters family, on the American soap operas The Young and the Restless and The Bold and the Beautiful
- Little Miss Barber, an advertising character for some brands of tea

== See also ==
- Attorney General Barber (disambiguation)
- General Barber (disambiguation)
- Judge Barber (disambiguation)
- Senator Barber (disambiguation)
