= John Barber =

John Barber may refer to:

== Politics ==
- John Barber (Lord Mayor of London) (died 1741), Jacobite printer, Lord Mayor of London in 1732
- John Barber, represented Tryon County in the North Carolina General Assembly of 1777
- John Roaf Barber (1841–1917), Canadian industrialist and politician

== Sports ==
- Jack Barber (1901–1961), English footballer
- John Barber (basketball) (born 1927), retired American basketball player
- John Barber (cricketer) (1849–1908), English cricketer
- John Barber (racing driver) (1929–2015), retired British Formula One driver
- Skip Barber (born 1936 as John Barber III), retired American racecar driver

== Others ==
- John Barber (artist, scholar), Vancouver-based sound artist and scholar
- John Barber (businessman) (1919–2004), British businessman
- John Barber (clergyman) (died 1549), English clergyman
- John Barber (engineer) (1734–1793), English inventor of the gas turbine in 1791
- John Barber (composer) (1980-), classical music composer from Bristol UK
- John P. Barber, American engineer, pioneer of the railgun technology
- John T. Barber, Cornish bard and poet hailing from St. Ives
- John Warner Barber (1798–1885), American artist and author of popular histories
- John William Barber ("Bill" Barber, 1920–2007), American tuba player

== See also ==
- John Barber White (1847–1923), American businessman and politician
