= Joshua Barber =

American artist

- Born: March 23, 1977 (age 49); Richmond, Virginia, U.S.
- Occupation: Artist/Designer
- Website: barberfineart.com

Joshua Barber (born 1977) is an American artist living and working in Richmond, Virginia.

== Work ==
Barber is best known for his modern icons, which he began painting in 2000 after a three-week trip to Jerusalem, Egypt and Jordan. Stylized figures on hand-weathered paper and wood, often embellished with gold leaf, recalled the religious artwork and the Dead Sea Scrolls Barber saw on his travels. Recent exhibitions of this work include the "Five Books" solo show (May 2005), consisting of 70 paintings interpreting verses from the Pentateuch of the Old Testament, and "Modern Icons," a collection of 20 paintings exhibited in a solo show at the Rainbow Café, Bristol, England (October 2007).

Barber also paints landscapes and abstract pieces distinguished by muted pastels, the use of acrylic with oil and pencil details. One of his landscapes, a depiction of the Vice President’s Residence at the United States Naval Observatory, was selected as the official Vice President’s 2004 holiday card.

Barber is represented by Tunnadine Fine Art in the United Kingdom, represents himself as Joshua Barber Fine Art in the United States and Richmond, Virginia.

== Biography ==
Barber was born in Richmond, Virginia. His father is John Barber, an acclaimed maritime artist. Joshua Barber paints modern-day icons and stylized landscapes. His multimedia work marries rough, tactile lines with delicate details. Joshua’s paintings have been exhibited in galleries in the United Kingdom, New York, Los Angeles and Richmond, as well as in the Dreweatts Urban Art Auction in London. Joshua is a board member of Art on Wheels and volunteers as an art instructor for children with cancer and their siblings through Connor’s Heroes. Joshua Barber received his BFA cum laude in 2000 from Appalachian State University.

== Exhibitions and Honors ==
2018 August – December: 6 East Broad Street “First Friday Exhibit” – Richmond, VA September: Saint Francis Home, Live and Silent Auction – Richmond, VA

2017 February – May: “Wish you were here Art Show” – Fountain Street Fine Art Gallery – Framingham, Massachusetts January: Nansemond-Suffolk Academy Art Show – Norfolk, Virginia

2016 November: Comfort Zone Camp, “With My Own Two Hands” to benefit children of Comfort Zone Camp – Richmond, VirginiaOctober: “Art Transforming Lives” Child Savers group show at Glave Kocen Gallery –Richmond, Virginia October: Child Savers Permanent Collection, Child Savers Gallery – Richmond, Virginia

2015 October: Child Savers Permanent Collection, Child Savers Gallery – Richmond, Virginia October: “Art Transforming Lives” Child Savers group show at Glave Kocen Gallery –Richmond, Virginia March: Comfort Zone Camp, “Grief Relief Gala” to benefit children of Comfort Zone Camp – Richmond, Virginia January: “The Jerusalem Series” Sara D. November Gallery – Richmond, Virginia

2014 December: “The Jerusalem Series” Sara D. November Gallery – Richmond, Virginia May: “Heroes Art Ball” benefit group show to support Connor’s Heroes – Richmond, Virginia March: Comfort Zone Camp, “Grief Relief Gala” to benefit children of Comfort Zone Camp – Richmond, Virginia January: “Small Works Show” group show at Glave Kocen Gallery – Richmond, Virginia

2013 March: “Cheers to Art,” Lewis Ginter Botanical Gardens – Massey Auditorium – Richmond, Virginia

2012 January: “Small Works Show” group show at Glave Kocen Gallery – Richmond, Virginia

2011 May: “Tradition with a twist” group show at smART Gallery – Williamsburg, Virginia May: “The Billboard Art Project” – Savannah, Georgia March: “Cheers to Art,” Lewis Ginter Botanical Gardens – Massey Auditorium – Richmond, Virginia February – June: Turchin Center for the Visual Arts – Boone, North Carolina January: “Artists Helping Artists” – Gallery 5800 – Richmond, Virginia

2010 November: Ballad of Nanny Fluff – London, U.K. October: Group exhibition featuring Joshua Barber, Andre Lucero and Ed Hatch – Gallery 5800 – Richmond, Virginia July: “Wooden and Paper Icons,” The Arts Council of the Valley – The Smith House – Harrisonburg, Virginia April: “Cheers to Art,” Lewis Ginter Botanical Gardens – Massey Auditorium – Richmond, Virginia April: Dreweatts Urban Contemporary Auction – London, U.K.

2009 December: “Advent” group show at 2 Degrees Gallery – Bristol, U.K. October: “Get Dring Mobile: Urban Art Auction” group show at Paintworks, Bath Road – Bristol, U.K. October: “Barber vs Barber,” a collection of 50 paintings with father and maritime artist John M. Barber at Gallery 5800 – Richmond, Virginia August: “Art in Mind” group exhibit at the Brick Lane Gallery – London, U.K. August: “A good-old fight that stands between me and the law” solo exhibit at the Knifesmith Gallery – Bristol, U.K. March: “The Inaugural Show” group exhibit at Art Raw Gallery – New York, New York June: “The Sketchbook Project” at Art House Gallery, Atlanta; Museum of Contemporary Art DC, Washington, D.C.; Laconia Gallery, Boston; Antena Gallery, Chicago; Soulard Art Market, St. Louis, MO; 3rd Ward, Brooklyn; Museum of Design Atlanta (MODA), Atlanta; Chicago Art Source Gallery, Chicago

2008 December: “Piazza Napoleone – Lucca” selected for the Virginia Museum of Fine Arts’ “Art After Hours” invitational exhibition and auction – Richmond, Virginia November: “Art Knows No Borders” group exhibit and auction to benefit Doctors Without Borders – Los Angeles, California September: “Art180″ – Richmond, Virginia

2007 October: “Modern Icons” solo show at the Rainbow Café – Bristol, U.K. January: “Are we there yet” selected for the Virginia Museum of Fine Arts’ “Art after Hours” invitational exhibition and auction – Richmond, Virginia

2006 December: Painting selected for charity auction at Art Works to benefit Art 180, a nonprofit that offers arts programs to young people living in challenging circumstances – Richmond, Virginia February: “We walk not upon a line” selected for the Virginia Museum of Fine Arts’ “Art After Hours” invitational exhibition and auction – Richmond, Virginia January: Three paintings from “Five Books” awarded second place overall in a juried show at Art Works – Richmond, Virginia

2005 May: “Five Books” solo show held in private space – Richmond, Virginia 2003 March: “Balance” solo show at the Barber Gallery – Richmond, Virginia

== Bibliography and Features ==
- Warscapes, New York City, New York
- RVA Magazine, Richmond, Virginia
- Gawker Artists, New York City, New York
- Metro.co.uk, South East England
- Ballad Of, London, England
- Holyghost, London, England
- Cerise Press, United States, France
- Peripheral Arteries, Rome, Italy
- Richmond Times-Dispatch, Richmond, Virginia
- Red Door Magazine, New York City, New York
- Hautstyle, Newcastle, England
- Papergirl Dublin, Ireland
- Ponshop, Fredericksburg, Virginia
- Kerosene & Things, Montreal, Canada
- Skull-A-Day, Richmond, Virginia
- Fredericksburg.com, Fredericksburg, Virginia
- Blisstree, Toronto, Ontario
- Style Weekly, Richmond, Virginia
- Please Hold Magazine, St. Louis, Missouri
