= Barbers family =

Political family in the Philippines

The Epaulette of Police Brigadier General James Barbers

The Barbers family is a political family in the Philippines whose patriarch is James Barbers. The Barbers family is associated with Surigao del Norte, first noticed as an emerging dynasty in the 2004 Philippine general election. James Barber's father was an American soldier deployed to the Philippines during its American colonization and comes from an Italian ancestry of the Barbieri clan of Sicily. James Barbers was Vice Mayor of Manila, the capital of the Philippines and a high ranking police superintendent. Members include senators, governors and congressmen.

Robert Barbers is a nephew of James Barbers. His two sons, Ace Barbers and Robert Jr., won as representative of the second district of Surigao del Norte and Makati councilor in the 1998 Philippine general election, respectively.
