= Charles Barber =

Charles Barber may refer to:

- Charles Alfred Barber (1860–1933), British botanist
- Charles Arnold Barber (1848–1915), Canadian architect and inventor
- Charles Barber (artist) (c. 1784–1854), English landscape painter and art teacher
- Charles Barber (author) (born 1962), author writing on mental health, psychiatry
- Charles Barber (Australian Army officer) (1888–1965), Australian soldier 1914–1948
- Charles Burton Barber (1845–1894), English painter of animals and children
- C. Chapman Barber (1803–1882), English barrister
- Charles E. Barber (1840–1917), chief engraver of the United States Mint
- Charles I. Barber (1887–1962), American architect
- Charles Frederick Barber (born 1949), Canadian politician
- Charles R. Barber (1901–1987), American politician
- Charlie Barber (1854–1910), American baseball player
- Charles Williams Barber (1872–1943), U.S. Army general
- Charles M. Barber (1876–1954), American college football coach, author, botanist and zoologist
