= George Barber =

George Barber may refer to:

== Politicians ==
- George Philip Barber (1863–1938), Australian politician
- George Barber (politician) (1860–1932), Australian politician
- George W. Barber (politician) (c. 1831–1870s), American politician in South Carolina

== Sportspeople ==
- George Barber (jumper) (1884–1938), Canadian athlete
- George Barber (footballer) (1908–1974), English footballer
- George Barber (pole vaulter), Canadian pole vaulter
- George W. Barber (1940–2026), American racecar driver and businessman

== Others ==
- George Anthony Barber (1802–1874), English-born Canadian educator, also known as the father of Canadian cricket
- George Franklin Barber (1854–1915), American architect
- George Barber (artist) (born 1958), British video artist
- George Barber, a character in the play Possible Worlds
- George Calvert Barber (1893–1967), Australian Methodist minister and president-general of the Methodist Church of Australasia 1951–1954
