= Ray Barber =

Ray Barber may refer to:

- Ray Barber (singer)
- Ray Barber (politician)
