= Tom Barber =

Tom Barber may refer to:

- Tom Barber (cricketer) (born 1995), English cricketer
- Tom Barber (golfer) (1894–1936), English professional golfer
- Tom Barber (Big Brother) (born 1996), English Big Brother contestant
- Tom Barber (artist), cover artist for Weird Tales
- Tom Barber (musician) (born 1991), American singer of Chelsea Grin and Darko US and formerly of Lorna Shore

== See also ==
- Thomas Barber (disambiguation)
