= Senator Barbour =

Senator Barbour may refer to:

== Members of the Northern Irish Senate ==
- Harold Barbour (1874–1938), Northern Irish Senator from 1921 to 1929

== Members of the United States Senate ==
- James Barbour (1775–1842), U.S. Senator from Virginia from 1815 to 1825
- John S. Barbour Jr. (1820–1892), U.S. Senator from Virginia from 1889 to 1892
- William Warren Barbour (1888–1943), U.S. Senator from New Jersey from 1931 to 1937 and from 1938 to 1943

== United States state senate members ==
- Edward Barbour, Missouri State Senate
- James J. Barbour (1869–1946), Illinois State Senate
- John C. Barbour (1895–1962), New Jersey State Senate

== See also ==
- Senator Barber (disambiguation)
