= Michael Barber =

Michael or Mike Barber may refer to:

- Michael Barber, Baron Barber of Chittlehampton (born 1955), British educationist
- Michael C. Barber (born 1954), Roman Catholic bishop of Oakland
- Michael Barber (chemist) (1934–1991), developer of fast atom bombardment
- Michael Barber (academic) (born 1947), Australian mathematician, physicist and academic
- Michael J. Barber (born 1960), American engineer

== Sportspeople ==
- Mike Barber (tight end) (born 1953), American football tight end and minister
- Mike Barber (linebacker) (born 1971), American football linebacker
- Michael Barber (wide receiver) (born 1967), American football wide receiver
- Michael Barber (athlete) (born 2000), Canadian Paralympic runner

== See also ==
- Ray Barber (singer) (Michael Joseph Barbetta, 1923–2009), American singer
- Mikele Barber (born 1980), American track and field sprint athlete
