= Richard Barber (disambiguation) =

Richard Barber (born 1941) is a British historian.

Richard Barber may also refer to:

- Richard Trevor Barber (1925–2015), New Zealand cricketer
- Richard Barber (MP), Member of Parliament (MP) for Great Grimsby
- Richard Barber (priest) (died 1590), English priest
- Dick Barber (1910–1983), American long jumper
- Richard Barber (politician), see Ottawa City Council
