= Chris Barber (disambiguation) =

Chris Barber (1930–2021) was a British jazz musician.

Chris or Christopher Barber may also refer to:

- Christopher Barber (painter) (1736–1810), English miniature painter
- Chris Barber (philanthropist) (1921–2012), chair of Oxfam 1983–1989
- Chris Barber (gridiron football) (born 1964), American gridiron football player
- Christopher John Barber (born 1975/1976), Canada convoy protest organiser

== See also ==
- Kris Barber, Canadian ice dancer
- Christine Barber, American politician
