= James Barber =

James Barber may refer to:

- James Barber (author) (1923–2007), Canadian author
- James Barber (biochemist) (1940–2020), British professor of biochemistry at Imperial College London
- James Barber (politician) (1921–2001), Pennsylvania politician
- James Barber (rugby) (1885–?), New Zealand rugby footballer who represented New Zealand in rugby league
- James A. Barber (1841–1925), American soldier in the American Civil War
- James David Barber (1930–2004), political scientist
- Jim Barber (ventriloquist), American ventriloquist
- Jim Barber (American football) (1912–1998), American football offensive tackle
