= General Barber =

General Barber may refer to:

- Charles Williams Barber (1872–1943), U.S. Army brigadier general
- Colin Muir Barber (1897–1964), British Army lieutenant general

== See also ==
- Attorney General Barber (disambiguation)
