= Noah Scalin =

American artist (born 1972)

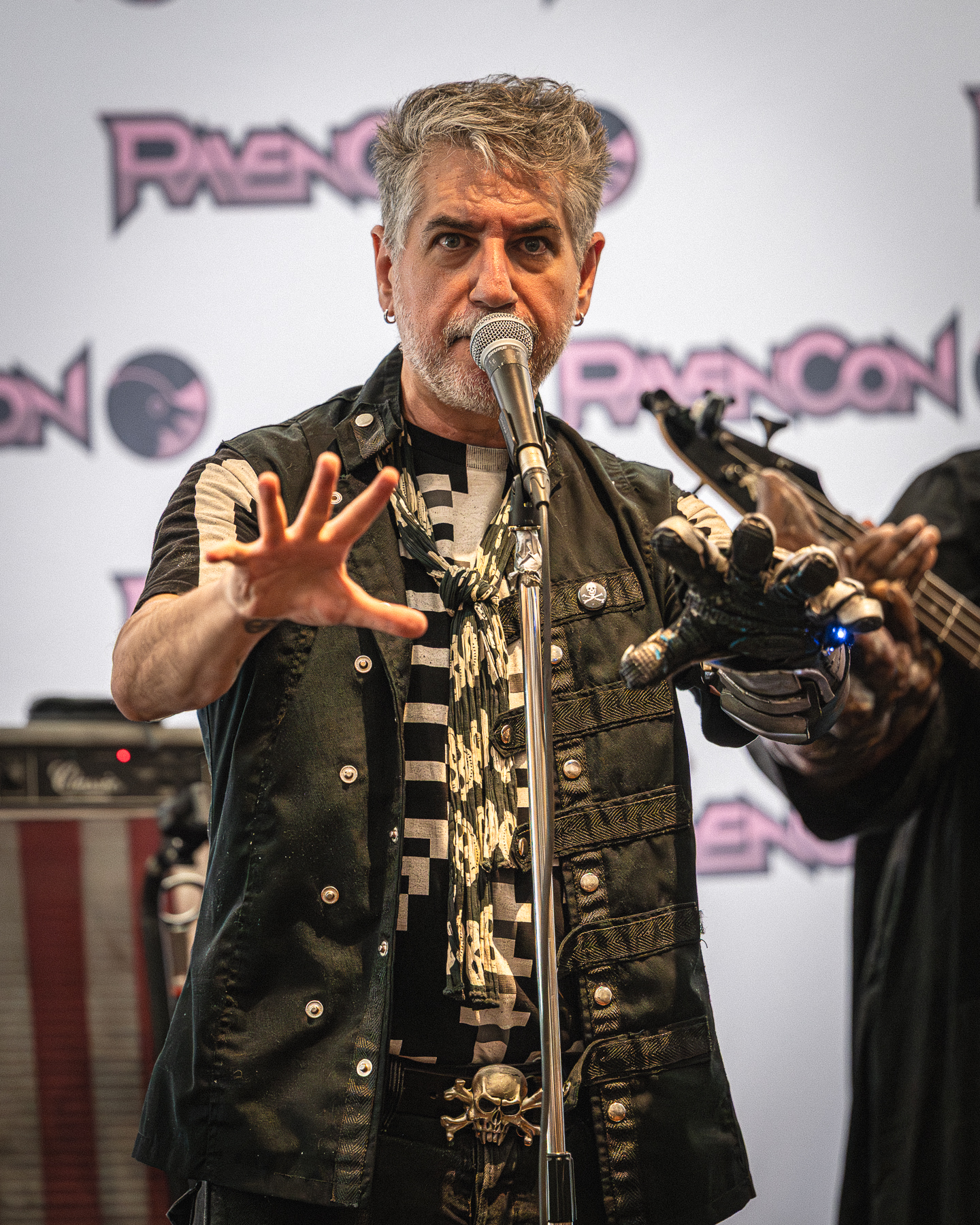
- Scalin performing at RavenCon in 2026
- Born: June 2, 1972 (age 54); Richmond, Virginia, U.S.
- Occupations: Artist; author; graphic designer

Noah Scalin (born June 2, 1972) is an American artist, known for his creation of the award winning Skull-A-Day art project weblog. He co-runs the art & innovation consulting firm that he founded Another Limited Rebellion in Richmond, Virginia with his sister Mica Scalin. Noah is the author of several books on creativity, art, and design.

Noah was an invited guest speaker at the 2009 Gel conference.

In 2016 Noah was named the first artist-in-residence at the Virginia Commonwealth University School of Business.

He is also the creator of the multi-platform science fiction universe/band League of Space Pirates.

== Books ==
Skulls, published by Lark Books in October 2008. The book features 150 images from the Skull-A-Day project and was named one of the "Top Ten Quick Picks for Reluctant Teen Readers" by the Young Adult Library Services Association in 2009. Skulls was also selected by the New York Public Library to be included on its 2009 Stuff for The Teen Age list of recommendations.

365: A Daily Creativity Journal published by Voyageur Press in December 2010. The book is a functional handbook which encourages the reader to create their own daily project using 365 creative cues and includes interviews with 13 other people who have done their own daily projects, including musician Jonathan Coulton.

Unstuck: 52 Ways to Get (and Keep) Your Creativity Flowing at Home, at Work & in Your Studio published by Voyageur Press in November 2011. It features 52 projects arranged by time (from 30 seconds to several hours), along with interviews of 12 other professional creatives who their tips on getting unstuck, including Improv Everywhere's Charlie Todd and musician Barry Louis Polisar.

The Design Activist's Handbook, published by HOW Books in October 2012. Co-authored with writer Michelle Taute, this book is an introduction to the world of socially conscious graphic design.

Skull-A-Day, published by Chop Suey Books Books in October 2014. This book features all 365 pieces of art created by Noah during his original Skull-A-Day project in chronological order. It also includes a foreword by Mütter Museum curator Anna Dhody.

Creative Sprint, published by Voyageur Press in April 2016. Co-authored with Noah’s business partner/sister Mica Scalin. This book is a companion to the ongoing series of public 30-day creativity challenges run by Noah & Mica’s company Another Limited Rebellion. The book features six 30-day Sprints and interviews with people who have completed their own Sprints.

== In popular culture ==
Noah Scalin was featured in a segment on the Martha Stewart show, in which he shared several of the pieces he created for Skull-A-Day, discussed the book Skulls, and made potato stamp skulls with Martha in a craft segment.

In 2020, Scalin's art work made from clothing was used in an Old Navy television commercial.

== Exhibitions ==
- 2011 Skulls Krause Gallery, New York, NY
- 2013 Natural Selection Krause Gallery, NYC
- 2014 Manhattan Project Krause Gallery, NYC
- 2015 Anatomy of War Krause Gallery, NYC
- 2016 Portrait of Innovation: James Conway Farley Virginia Museum of Fine Arts, Richmond, VA

=== Selected group exhibitions ===
- 2008 Take Action! Museum of World Culture, Gothenburg, Sweden
- 2009 What You Can Do With The City Graham Foundation, Chicago, Illinois
- 2010 Endangered Species Print Project Barbara&Barbara, Chicago, IL
- 2010 Street Anatomy – International Museum of Surgical Sciences, Chicago, IL
- 2010 Skull Parlor Gallery, Asbury Park, NJ
- 2010 Small Works Krause Gallery, New York, NY
- 2011 A Live Animal Root Division, San Francisco, CA
- 2011 Endangered Species Print Project The Gallery of the Common Experience, San Marcos, TX
- 2011 SCOPE Art Fair, New York, NY
- 2012 Hollow Thoughts Gallery Nucleus, Los Angeles, CA
- 2012 Skull Appreciation Day Mütter Museum, Philadelphia, PA
- 2012 Above and Below TCC Visual Arts Center, Tidewater, VA
- 2013 SCOPE Art Fair New York, NY
- 2013 Face Off International Museum of Surgical Science, Chicago, IL
- 2013 Emerging to Established Krause Gallery, NYC
- 2013 Governor’s Island Art Fair, New York, NY
- 2014 Rare Nature: The Endangered Species Print Project – The Peggy Notebaert Nature Museum, Chicago, IL
- 2014 Emerging to Established Krause Gallery, NYC
- 2014 The Skull Show – Bedford Gallery at Lesher Center for The Arts, Walnut Creek, CA
- 2014 Celebrabis Vitae Box Studios, London, UK
- 2015 Group Show 3, Glitch Gallery, Richmond, VA
- 2015 Past to Present Krause Gallery, NYC
- 2015 Emerging to Established, Year 3 Krause Gallery, NYC
- 2015 Carpe Noctem The Charles H. Taylor Arts Center, Hampton, VA
- 2016 Unconventional WYN317, Miami, FL
- 2016 L'Art de Crâne Galerie Sakura, Paris, France,
