= Daniel Barber =

Daniel Barber may refer to:

- Daniel Barber (minister) (1756–1834), American Episcopalian minister
- Daniel Barber (director) (born 1965), British commercials and film director
- Danny Barber (soccer) (born 1971), retired U.S. soccer midfielder
- Daniel Barber (cyclist) (born 2003), Australian cyclist
- Danny Barber (serial killer) (1955–1999), American serial killer
- Dan Barber (born 1969), American chef
