= Horatio Barber (cricketer) =

English cricketer

Personal information
- Full name: Horatio William Barber
- Born: 27 February 1843; Broughton, England
- Died: 27 April 1869 (aged 26); St Leonards-on-Sea, England
- Batting: Left-handed
- Bowling: Right-arm

Domestic team information
- Years: Team
- 1866–1867: Lancashire
- First-class debut: 23 August 1866 Lancashire v Surrey
- Last First-class: 26 August 1867 North of England v Nottinghamshire

Career statistics
Competition	First-class
Matches	5
Runs scored	69
Batting average	6.90
100s/50s	0/0
Top score	20
Balls bowled	0
Wickets	0
Bowling average	0.00
5 wickets in innings	0
10 wickets in match	0
Best bowling	n/a
Catches/stumpings	6/–
- Source: CricketArchive, 4 May 2011

Horatio William Barber (27 February 1843 – 27 April 1869) was an English cricketer. He was born in Broughton, near Manchester, and began to play local cricket with his hometown club in 1861. During the 1863 season, Barber played several matches for Cheshire. He also represented the Gentlemen of Manchester and the Gentlemen of Lancashire occasionally.

Barber subsequently joined Lancashire and made his first-class debut in the match against Surrey in August 1866, scoring 4 in each innings. He played two more County matches for Lancashire the following season, against Yorkshire and Surrey, and was also selected to represent the Gentlemen of the North in July 1867. Barber appeared in his final first-class match the following month, playing for the North of England against Nottinghamshire. In the match, he achieved his highest first-class score of 20, before being bowled by George Wootton.
