= David Barber =

David Barber may refer to:

- David G. Barber (1960–2022), Canadian scientist and academic
- David Barber (cricketer) (born 1937), English cricketer
- Dave Barber (1955–2015), American radio and television personality

== See also ==
- Dave Barbour (1912–1965), American jazz guitarist
