= Mary Barber =

Mary Barber may refer to:

- Mary Barber (poet) (c. 1685–c. 1755), Irish poet
- Mary Elizabeth Barber (1818–1899), British-born naturalist
- Mary Barber (bacteriologist) (1911–1965), British pathologist and bacteriologist
- Mary Augustine Barber (1789–1860), American educator and Visitation sister

== See also ==
- Mary Barbour (1875–1958), Scottish political activist, local councillor, bailie and magistrate
