= C. Chapman Barber =

English barrister

Charles Chapman Barber (27 September 1803 – 5 February 1882) was an English barrister and judge.

== Life ==
The son of Chapman Barber and Susanna Cooper, Barber was born in St Clement Danes, London, where he was baptised non-conformist. He was educated at St John's College, Cambridge, where he graduated ninth wrangler in 1833. In the same year he was called to the bar at Lincoln's Inn. He was a pupil of Mr. Duval, an eminent conveyancer. He acquired a high reputation as an equity draftsman and conveyancer, and, though he never took silk, had for nearly half a century an extensive practice at the junior bar. He was one of the commissioners appointed to reform the procedure of the Court of Chancery in 1853, his large experience of chancery business rendering his suggestions of the highest value in the work of framing the rules of practice issued under the Chancery Amendment Acts.

In the chancery proceedings by which, in 1867, the celebrated Orton or Castro first sought to establish his claim to the Tichborne baronetcy and estates, Barber held a brief for the defendants, as he did again in the first of the two actions of ejectment which were subsequently brought in the court of common pleas for the same purpose, in the well-known case of Tichborne v. Lushington, decided in 1872 after a trial which lasted 103 days. He also acted as one of the counsel for the crown in the prosecution for perjury which followed, and which occupied in the hearing from first to last 188 days. In 1874 he was appointed judge of county courts for circuit No. 6 (Hull and the East Riding), but resigned the post almost immediately, and resumed practice at the bar.

He married Harriet Frances Bambrick in France in 1845. He died at his residence (71 Cornwall Gardens).
