= Senator Barber =

Senator Barber may refer to:

- Alexander E. Barber (1829/30–1875), Louisiana State Senate
- F. Elliott Barber Jr. (1912–1992), Vermont State Senate
- Herbert G. Barber (1870–1947), Vermont State Senate
- Homer G. Barber (1830–1909), Michigan State Senate
- Isaac Barber (New Jersey politician) (1854–1933), New Jersey State Senate
- J. Allen Barber (1809–1881), Wisconsin State Senate
- Joseph L. Barber (1864–1940), Wisconsin State Senate
- Merrill P. Barber (1910–1985), Florida State Senate
- Orion M. Barber (1857–1930), Vermont State Senate

== See also ==
- Senator Barbour (disambiguation)
