= John P. Barber =

American academic

John P. Barber is a pioneer of railgun technology.

Dr. Barber received the Bachelor of Science degree in Engineering Physics from the University of Saskatchewan in 1967 and his Ph.D. in Engineering Physics from Australian National University in 1972. He joined the University of Dayton Research Institute in 1974 and directed the Impact Physics Group there until 1979 when he resigned to go into business. Dr. Barber co-founded IAP Research in 1981 and has served as President since.

Dr. Barber has had a distinguished career in research and development. His graduate work on electromagnetic guns became the foundation for the ongoing program in the US to develop railgun technology for a variety of military and aerospace applications. His contributions to the development of electromagnetic gun technology were recognized in 1988 when he was awarded the Peter Mark Medal. He holds seven patents in magnetics and superconductivity.

Dr. Barber is a member of the Institute of Electrical and Electronics Engineers, the American Institute of Aeronautics and Astronautics, the American Defense Preparedness Association, and the Metal Powder Industry Federation. He serves on the Board and Executive Committee of the Edison Materials Technology Center, and is a member of the Materials and Process Advisory Panel of the Miami Valley Economic Development Coalition.
