= Attorney General Barber =

Attorney General Barber may refer to:

- F. Elliott Barber Jr. (1912–1992), Attorney General of Vermont
- Herbert G. Barber (1870–1947), Attorney General of Vermont

== See also ==
- General Barber (disambiguation)
