= George W. Barber (politician) =

American politician in South Carolina

South Carolina State Senate
- In office 1868–1872

Personal details
- Born: c. 1831 South Carolina, U.S.
- Died: 1870s
- Party: Republican

George W. Barber (c. 1831–1870s) was an American carpenter, farmer and state legislator who served in the South Carolina State Senate during the Reconstruction era from 1868 until 1872.

== Biography ==
Barber was born enslaved in South Carolina in 1831. He has been listed as a farmer and a carpenter.

He was elected to the South Carolina State Senate in 1868 and served until 1872 representing Fairfield County as a Republican. He lost the nomination to run again for the senate in September 1872 with Sanders Ford standing in his place, he instead was put on the ticket to run for representative.

He was also the commissioner of elections in 1870 for Fairfield along with N. G. Dunlap and Samuel Simpson. The same year he was listed in the census as owning real estate worth $600 with an additional $150 worth of personal property.

Barber was threatened by the Ku Klux Klan in May 1871 when they posted in the paper demands that he along with seven others resign from office. This caused him to temporarily leave his home in fear and move to Columbia, South Carolina before later returning.

He was a delegate at the Radical State Convention in August 1872, representing Fairfield County along with L.W. Duvall and T. J. Minton.

He continued in politics for a while and in August 1874 he was chair of a republican meeting in Winnsboro and again chair in August 1875 for a meeting on the next election. However by October 20, 1875 he had become "disgusted" with politics and returned to carpentry.

His wife was listed in the 1880 United States census as being a widow, so he died sometime between October 1875 and June 1880. his kids were listed in 1890 US census

== See also ==
- African American officeholders from the end of the Civil War until before 1900
