= Barberis =

Barberis is a surname. Notable people with the surname include:

- Dominique Barbéris (born 1958), French novelist, author, and professor
- Mariolino Barberis (born 1949), Italian singer
- Sébastien Barberis (born 1972), Swiss retired footballer
- Stephano Barberis, Canadian music video director
- Umberto Barberis (born 1952), Swiss-Italian footballer and manager
