= Eric Barber =

Eric Barber may refer to:

- Eric Barber (Irish footballer) (1942–2014), Irish football striker for Shelbourne and Kansas City Spurs
- Eric Barber (cricketer) (1915–1995), English cricketer
- Eric Barber (English footballer) (1926–2015), English football forward with Rochdale
- Eric Arthur Barber (1888–1965), Oxford college head
- Eric Barber, British plumbing executive, recipient of 1990 New Year Honours
- Eric Barber (basketball), American Paralympic athlete; see Wheelchair basketball at the 2000 Summer Paralympics

== See also ==
- Eric Barbour (1891–1934), Australian cricket player, physician and author
- Barber (disambiguation)
