= Ida Barber =

German author (1842–1931)

- Born: Ida Punitzer; 19 July 1842; Berlin, Kingdom of Prussia
- Died: 5 October 1931 (aged 89); Vienna, Austria
- Resting place: Döbling Cemetery, Vienna
- Spouse: Max Barber (m. 1872; died 1913)
- Writing career
- Pen name: Ivan Baranow; Ida Baranow
- Language: German

Ida Barber (née Punitzer; 19 July 1842 – 5 October 1931), (Note: Some sources differ on her date of birth, which has also been given as 9 July, 12 July, 13 July, and 1 August 1842.) also known by the pen name Ivan Baranow, was a German writer, journalist, and social activist.

Barber was a prolific novelist and short story writer, publishing at least fifteen books between 1878 and 1919, as well as numerous serials. Her fiction often addressed women's issues and Jewish family life. She is also regarded as a pioneer of fashion journalism. Barber was a prominent member of the women's movement in Vienna, and played a significant role in founding and leading women's organizations, including the Association of Women Writers and Artists.

== Early life ==
Ida Punitzer was born into a Jewish family in Berlin, Prussia, in 1842. Her father, Hirsch (Hermann) Punitzer, and her uncle Alexander Aaron Punitzer originated from Lissa (now Leszno, Poland) and had settled in Berlin in the late 1830s, where they became established as master tailors in the city's emerging clothing industry. Her mother, Henriette (née Cohn), was the daughter of a women's clothing manufacturer. After completing her schooling, Punitzer worked as a teacher at the Berlin Höheren Töchterschule.

== Marriage and Leipzig period ==
In 1872 she married Max Barber, a merchant originally from Czernowitz (now Chernivtsi, Ukraine). The couple settled in Leipzig, where their three sons—Bernhard (1874–1942), Sigmund (1875–1955), and Arnold (1879–1949)—were born.

In Leipzig, Barber became active in both civic life and literary pursuits. In the spring of 1877, she founded the Leipzig Housewives' Association, modeled on Lina Morgenstern's Berlin association, and served as its first president. The group grew to over 1,500 members within a year. Internal disputes, however, culminated in public accusations that she acted without authorization and that her husband was improperly involved in the association's affairs, leading to her being briefly deposed as president.

Her first novel, Gebrochene Herzen, was published in Leipzig in 1877. Around this time she also began corresponding with the writer and journalist Karl Emil Franzos, who provided advice and connections for her literary career.

== Move to Vienna and literary career ==
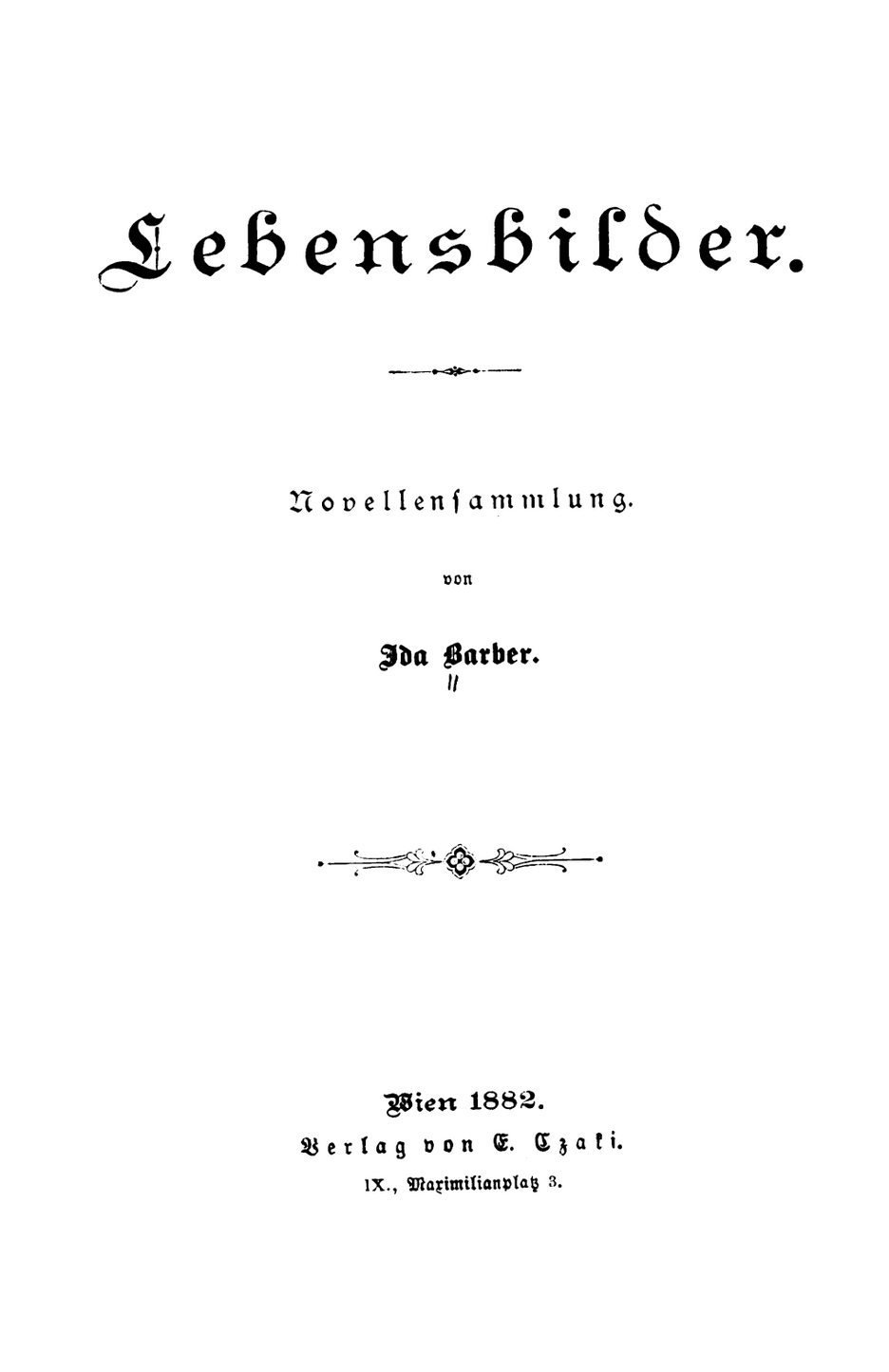
Title page of Lebensbilder (1882)

Between late 1879 and early 1880, the Barber family moved to Vienna. There, she pursued writing intensively. Among other publications, she contributed to the Neue Freie Presse, Die Presse, the Wiener Allgemeine Zeitung, the Hamburger Correspondent, Österreichs Illustrirte Zeitung, and the Prager Tagblatt. She was editor of the Wiener Bazar, co-founder of the fashion magazine Wiener Mode, and manager the women's section of the Prague Zionist weekly Selbstwehr.

Barber often engaged with social issues in her journalism. In the Allgemeine Frauen-Zeitung (1892), she argued for equal pay for equal work and highlighted the economic realities of women's lives. To Bertha von Suttner's pacifist journal Die Waffen nieder! she contributed anti-militarist essays, including the satirical "Kanonenfutter".

Her most sustained journalistic position was as at the Pester Lloyd, where from the early 1880s through the 1900s she published a weekly fashion column. These Modeberichte incorporated reports on fashion trends with social and political commentary, and were considered innovative in elevating fashion writing to a recognized literary form. She was particularly noted for criticizing restrictive corsetry and promoting dress reform.

Barber was instrumental in founding the Association of Women Writers and Artists in Vienna in 1886, together with Marie von Ebner-Eschenbach and Betty Paoli. She was also a founder of the Student Support Association in 1885, and was active in von Suttner's Peace Society.

== Later life and death ==
After her husband's death in 1913, Barber focused on relief work and wrote only occasionally. During World War I she organized aid for Galician and Bukovinian Jewish refugees through the Brockensammlung, becoming its president in 1916.

She spent her later years in Vienna and nearby Purkersdorf, living with her son Sigmund. She died in Vienna on 5 October 1931 at the age of 89, survived by her three sons.

Her eldest son Bernhard was an author and essayist. He and his family were deported to the Łódź Ghetto in 1942 and perished in the Holocaust. Her youngest son Arnold, a city architect, was imprisoned in Dachau in 1938 but was able to flee with his wife to Palestine; their children settled in New Zealand and the United States. Sigmund survived abroad and returned to Vienna after the Second World War, dying there in 1955.

== Partial bibliography ==
Between 1878 and 1919, Barber published at least fifteen books, in addition to numerous serialized works. Her fiction often addressed themes of antisemitism, Jewish assimilation, and Jewish family life. In her fiction she portrayed a wide range of Jewish women and frequently emphasized that women could find happiness through their own independence.

=== Books ===
- Russische Mysterien [Russian Mysteries]. Breslau. 1881.
- Lebensbilder. Novellensammlung [Life-Pictures]. Vienna: E. Czaki. 1882.
- Gerächt, doch nicht gerichtet [Avenged, But Not Judged]. 1884.
- Mann zweier Frauen [Man of Two Women]. 1885.
- Verkaufte Frauen [Sold Women]. 1885.
- Versöhnt [Reconciled]. 1885.
- Aus der russischen Gesellschaft [From Russian Society]. 1887.
- Gebrochene Herzen. Erzählung [Broken Hearts]. 1887.
- Der neue Monte Christo [The New Monte Cristo]. 1891.
- Genrebilder aus dem jüdischen Familienleben [Genre-Pictures from Jewish Family Life]. Prague: Brandeis. 1895.
- Ihr Schwiegersohn. Roman [Her Son-in-Law]. Leipzig: M. Breitenstein. 1896.
- Arbeit adelt [Work Ennobles]. 1896.
- Glaubenskämpfe. 3 Erzählungen [Battles of Faith]. Prague: Brandeis. 1900.
- Die rechte Liebe war es nicht [It Was Not the Right Love]. Dresden: Mignonverl. 1919.

=== In magazines ===
- "Wandlungen" [Transformations]. Die Waffen Nieder!. 4 (12): 438–441.
- "Der Wert der Nahrungsmittel" [The Value of Food]. Frauen-Werke. 2: 2–4. 1898.
- "Friedensengel" [Angels of Peace]. Frauen-Werke. 11: 6–8. 1898.
- "Wie es der Frau Schwamberger im Süden erging" [How Mrs Schwamberger Fared in the South]. Frauen-Werke. 5: 3–5. 1898.
- "Wie es der Frau Schwamberger im Süden erging (Schluß)" [How Mrs Schwamberger Fared in the South (conclusion)]. Frauen-Werke. 7: 1–2. 1898.
- "Frauengestalten aus Schillers Dramen" [Female Characters in Schiller's Dramas]. Frauen-Werke. 11: 1–3. 1899.
- "Gütergemeinschaft im ehelichen Leben" [Joint Property in Married Life]. Allgemeine Frauen-Zeitung. 7: 71–72. 1893–1894.
- "Frauengestalten aus Schillers Dramen (Fortsetzung)" [Female Characters in Schiller's Dramas (continued)]. Frauen-Werke. 2: 2–3. 1900.
- "Die national-ökonomische Stellung der Frau" [The National-Economic Position of Women]. Ethische Kultur. 36: 284–285. 1902.
- "Frauengestalten aus Schillers Dramen (Schluß)" [Female Characters in Schiller's Dramas (conclusion)]. Frauen-Werke. 3: 2. 1900.
- "Eine Anklage" [An Incident]. Die Frau und Mutter. 8: 3–5. 1918.
- "Kranke Frauen" [Sickly Women]. Die Frau und Mutter. 11–12: 8–9. 1919.
