= Paul Barber =

Paul Barber may refer to:

- Paul Barber (actor) (born 1951), British actor
- Paul Barber (field hockey) (born 1955), former British field hockey player and Olympic medal winner
- Paul Barber (football executive), English football administrator
- Paul Barber (bishop) (1935–2021), bishop of Brixworth
- Paul Barber, a character in the Malayalam film Akkare Akkare Akkare
- Paul Barber (farmer) (1942–2023), British farmer and racehorse owner
