= Judge Barber =

Judge Barber may refer to:

- Thomas Barber (judge) (born 1966), judge of the United States District Court for the Middle District of Florida
- Orion M. Barber (1857–1930), associate judge of the United States Court of Customs and Patent Appeals

== See also ==
- Carl Barbier (born 1944), judge of the United States District Court for the Eastern District of Louisiana
- Philip P. Barbour (1783–1841), associate justice of the Supreme Court of the United States
- William H. Barbour Jr. (1941–2021), judge of the United States District Court for the Southern District of Mississippi
- William P. Barber (1907–1984), justice of the Connecticut Supreme Court
