= Mark Barber =

American football player (1915–1975)

- Barber, circa 1936

No. 6
- Positions: Fullback, linebacker

Personal information
- Born: May 19, 1915; Alpena, South Dakota, U.S.
- Died: February 24, 1975 (aged 59); Denver, Colorado, U.S.
- Listed height: 5 ft 11 in (1.80 m)
- Listed weight: 192 lb (87 kg)

Career information
- High school: Alpena
- College: South Dakota State (1933–1936)
- NFL draft: 1937: undrafted

Career history
- Cleveland Rams (1937)
- Stats at Pro Football Reference

Mark Ernest Barber (May 19, 1915 – February 24, 1975) was an American professional football player for the Cleveland Rams of the National Football League (NFL). He played college football and basketball for the South Dakota State Jackrabbits.

== Early life ==
Mark Ernest Barber was born on May 19, 1915, in Alpena, South Dakota. He attended Alpena High School, where he competed in basketball and track. He was captain of the basketball team during his junior and senior seasons. As a senior during the 1933 track season, Barber was a state qualifier in the shot put, discus throw, and football throw.

== College career ==
Barber enrolled at the South Dakota State College of Agriculture and Mechanic Arts in 1933. He played college basketball and football for the Jackrabbits. He had never played football before until joining the school's freshman football team for the 1933 season. Barber earned a varsity letter at guard in 1934 and was the starting fullback from 1935 to 1936.

Barber was a forward on the 1934 basketball team, earned all-conference honors in 1935 as a guard, and was co-captain of the 1936 basketball team. He graduated from South Dakota State with a civil engineering degree.

== Professional career ==
Barber went undrafted in the 1937 NFL draft. On March 30, 1937, it was reported that he had signed with the Cleveland Rams. He played in the first five games of the 1937 season, starting one, for the Rams as a fullback/linebacker, rushing 14 times for 35 yards while also completing one of three passes for seven yards. He suffered a shoulder injury in October and did not play in another game that year.

== Personal life ==
Barber died on February 24, 1975, in Denver, Colorado.
