= Pauline Gardiner Barber =

Canadian social anthropologist

Pauline Gardiner Barber is a Canadian social anthropologist and professor emerita at Dalhousie University.

== Education and career ==
Barber was born in New Zealand, and holds a Bachelor of Arts and a Master of Arts from the University of Auckland. She received her PhD in social anthropology from the University of Toronto. Her research is focused on issues concerning culture, political economy, and development, particularly involving migration. She participates in On the Move, a research partnership funded by the Social Sciences and Humanities Research Council (SSHRC).

Barber's articles have appeared in journals such as Dialectical Anthropology, International Migration, and the Journal of Ethnic and Migration Studies.

== Books ==
- Barber, Pauline Gardiner; Lem, Winnie (2010). Class, Contention, and a World in Motion. New York: Berghahn Books. ISBN 978-1-8454-5686-3.
- Barber, Pauline Gardiner; Lem, Winnie (2012). Migration in the 21st Century: Political Economy and Ethnography. New York & London: Routledge. ISBN 978-0-4158-9222-3.
- Barber, Pauline Gardiner; Lem, Winnie (2018). Migration, Temporality, and Capitalism: Entangled Mobilities across Global Spaces. Palgrave Macmillan. ISBN 978-3-3197-2780-6.
