= Papergirl =

Art project

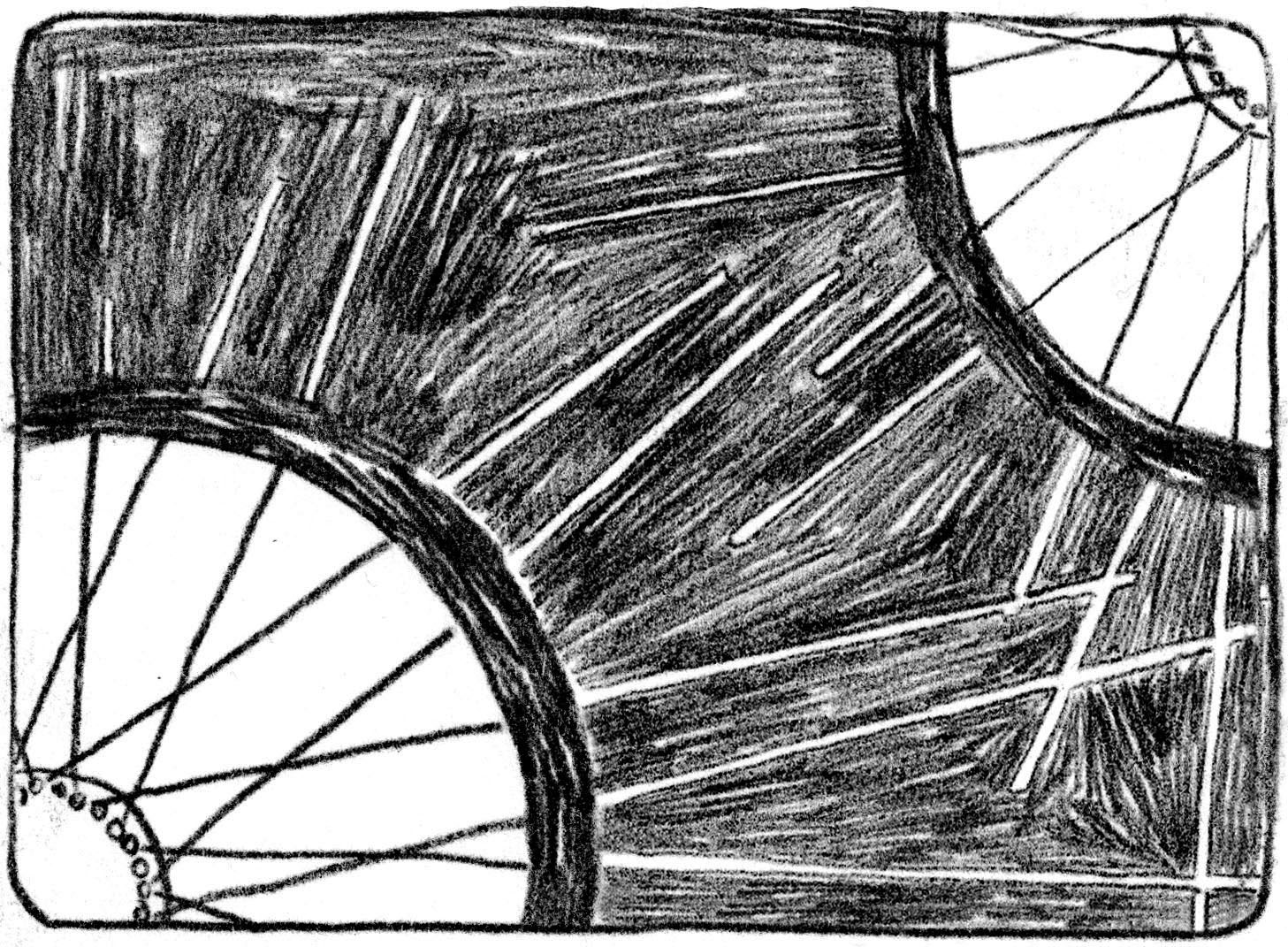
Papergirl Logo

Papergirl is a community street art project originating in Berlin in 2006, which is now produced in cities worldwide. Art is collected from the local creative community, exhibited, and then, in the style of American paperboys, rolled up and distributed by bicycle in city centres, to random passers-by. The project was started in response to it being a criminal offense to post art in public places within Berlin. As placarding is an integral part of urban art, local artist Aisha Ronniger conceived an alternative way of sharing art in public spaces, without focusing on any particular target demographic. Hence Papergirl was founded whereby works of art are handed directly to the general public at random, similar to how newspapers were distributed in decades past.

== About the project ==
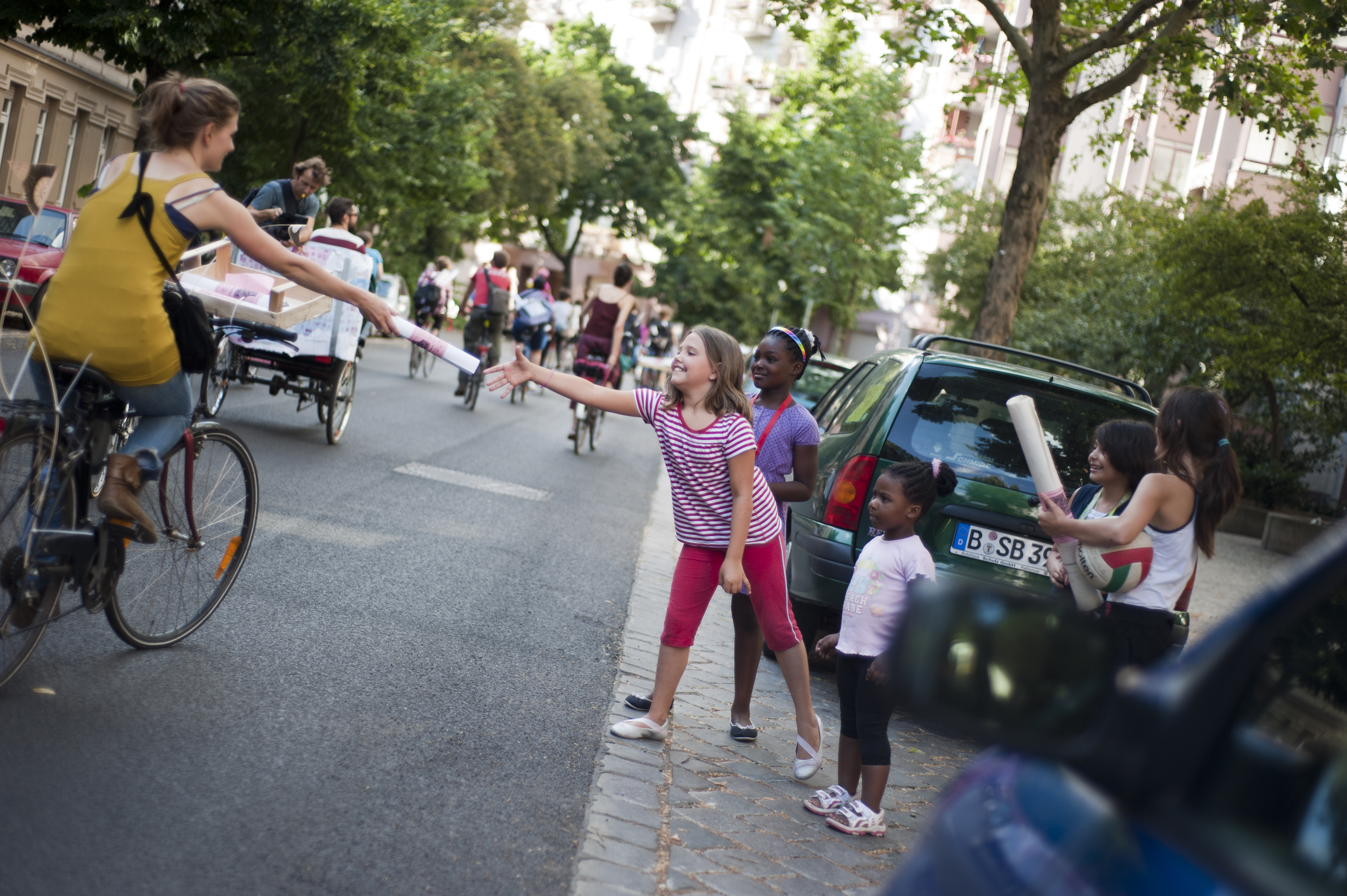
Papergirl Distribution. 18th of July 2010 in Berlin.

The project is organised into four/five components, which are followed by all Papergirl teams worldwide:

1. An open-call is placed to the (local) community requesting people (not necessarily artists) to submit work.
2. An exhibition is held in which the work is showcased.
3. The artwork is rolled up and then distributed by bicycle in a group to random individuals in urban areas.
4. Sometimes a workshop or talk is organized for the local community.
5. A celebration is held to thank everyone involved.

Anyone who wishes to be involved is invited to participate. Any medium is accepted such as drawings, photographs, text, pictures, stickers, posters, photo-copies - basically anything that is not offensive to anyone and can be rolled and distributed in the Papergirl fashion. Individuals are invited to submit as many contributions as they would like - in some cases art work is reproduced by the participants to allow broader distribution than a single original. Submissions are usually accepted through post or at a drop-off location. The distribution is organized as an urban action and should be a surprise and present to random recipients in the streets. Any volunteer is welcome to join and distribute the artwork with the group. The ethos behind Papergirl is to have fun as a group of people and to make other people happy whilst doing so.

== General concept ==
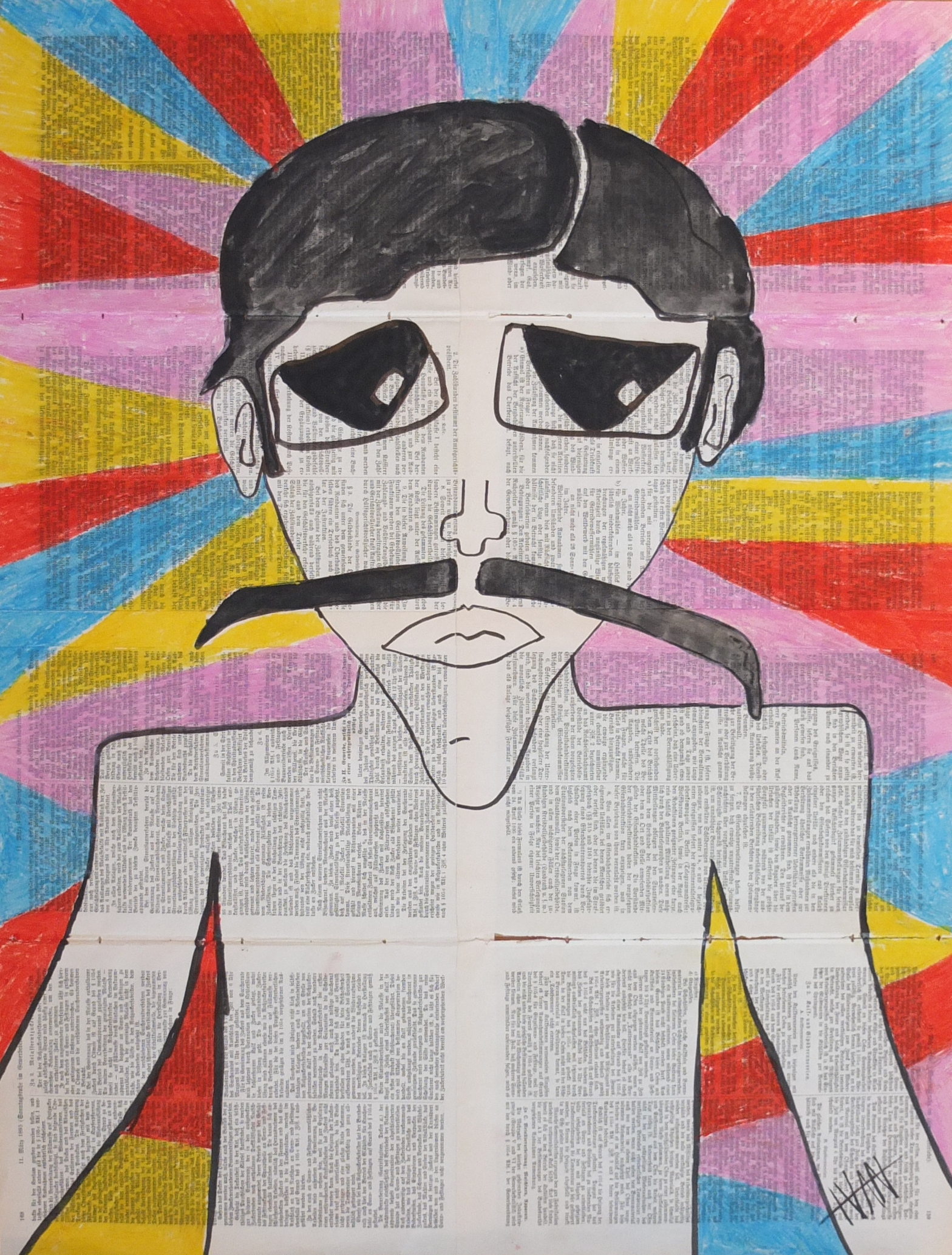
"Señor Jesus"

Papergirl projects exist worldwide and follow the concept of open source, however they are subject to a set of criteria set-out by the Berlin creators.

1. These requirements include it not being a commercial venture whereby any party benefits financially. There can be sponsorship or funding involved as long as it solely serves the realization of the project. But the submitted artworks are not for sale within the project.
2. The project is participatory, which means anyone who wishes to be involved is invited to participate, regardless of age, education, profession, gender, or location.
3. Consequently, the submissions aren't selected and therefore the exhibition is "uncurated".
4. The submitted artworks are referred to as "analog", as they can not be submitted as digital files. This method enhances the participants authorship and the production or reproduction of each individual artwork lies entirely in the makers hands.

== History ==
The project started in 2006 as a reaction to a tightening of a law in Berlin in 2005 that equated sticking up posters in public places with spraying graffiti. It was initiated as a one-time event, but was repeated once a year till 2010. In the first year it had 35 participants and consisted “only” of the urban action, but it kept on growing. In 2007 an exhibition was added to the project and took place at Senatsreservespeicher, Friedrichshain-Kreuzberg from 16th till 18 July. This year had 50 participants. In 2008 the project got joined by a flexible team. The exhibition took place at Galerie Vorspiel, Kreuzberg from 11th till 25 July 2008, including 77 artists from 9 different countries. The fourth time took place at Alte Post, Neukölln, from 2nd till 23 July 2009, where 170 international submissions from more than 17 countries were shown. A mutant-bike workshop and a party was added. Since 2009 independent sister projects were founded in many other cities around the world. The fifth and last Papergirl-Berlin had 241 participants that were shown at Galerie Neurotitan, Mitte from 4th till 23 July 2010. Some of the international Papergirl-organizers from Bucharest, Manchester, Cape Town and Albany were invited to meet and exchange experiences during a "camp".

== Worldwide projects ==
Some of the Papergirl projects in alphabetic order are as follows:

- Barcelona, Spain
- Belfast, Northern Ireland
- Belgrade, Serbia
- Berlin, Germany
- Birmingham, England
- Brasov, Romania
- Brisbane, Australia
- Bristol, England
- Constanta, Romania
- Cape Town, South Africa
- Cardiff, Wales
- Chișinău, Moldova
- Dublin, Ireland
- Glasgow, Scotland
- Hamburg, Germany
- Iasi, Romania
- Istanbul, Turkey
- Kelowna, Canada
- Leeds, England
- Manchester, England
- Mexico City, Mexico
- Newcastle, England
- New York, USA
- San Francisco, USA
- Toronto, Canada
- Trier, Germany
- Vancouver, Canada
