= Little Miss Barber =

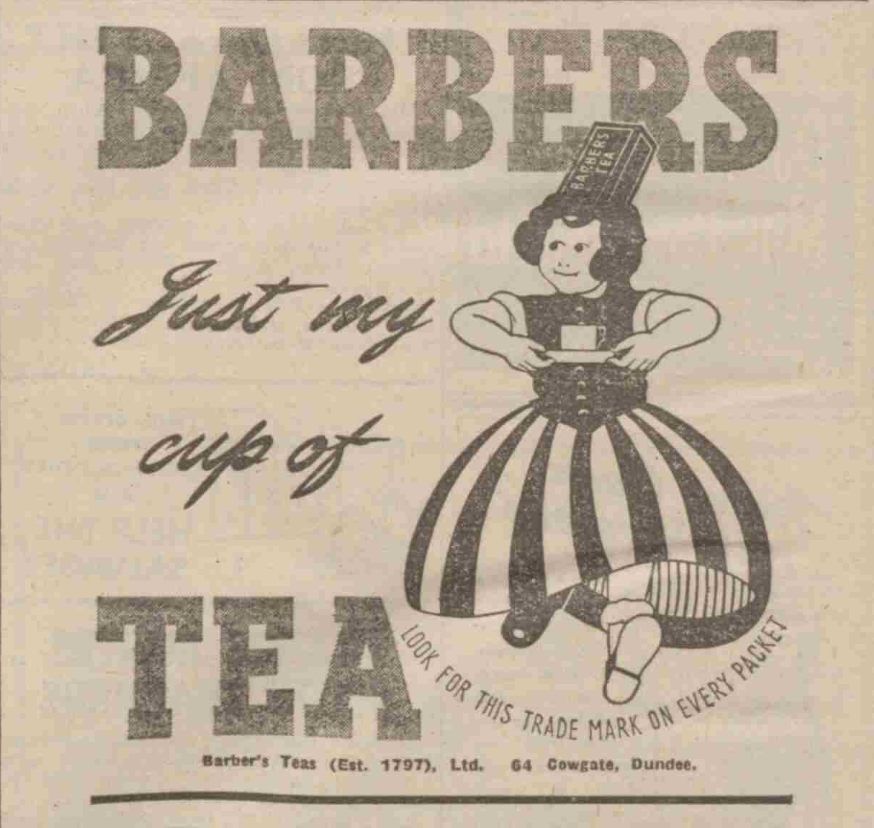
March 1949 newspaper advertisement for Barbers Tea

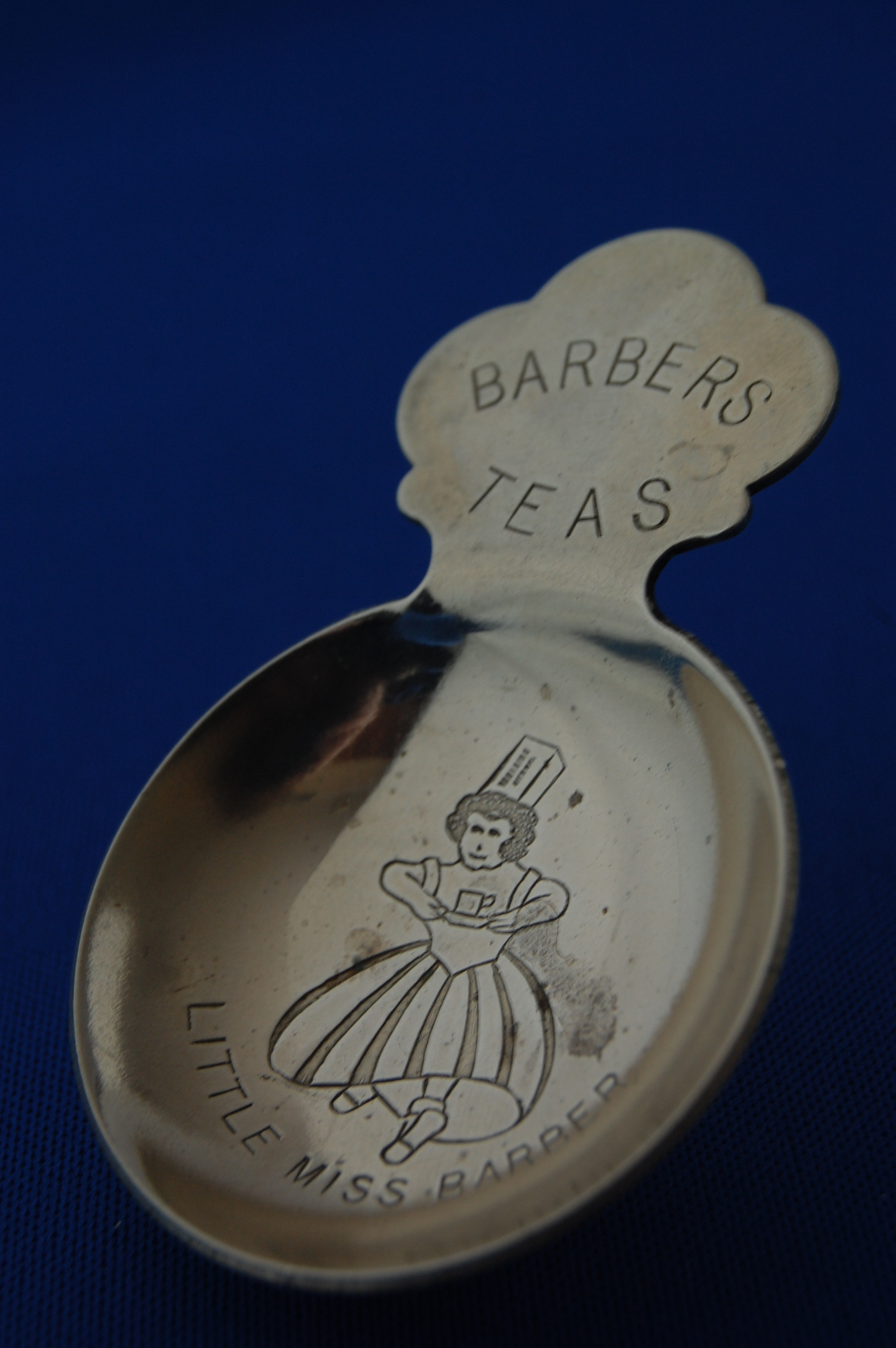
A caddy spoon featuring Little Miss Barber

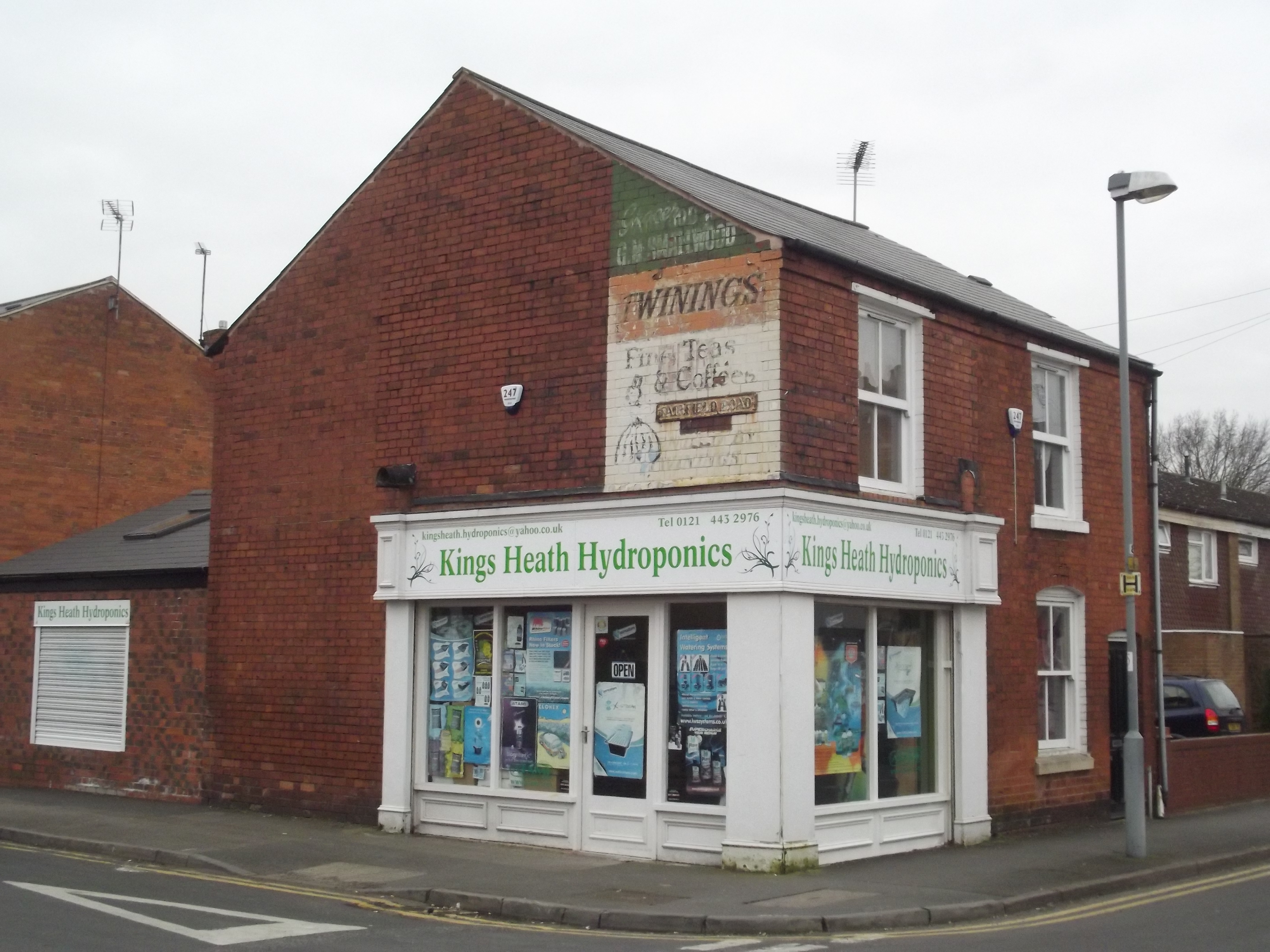
Little Miss Barber on a ghost sign advertising Twinings Tea, in Kings Heath, Birmingham, in 2013

Little Miss Barber was an advertising character and trademark for a number of brands of tea, including Barber's, Orantips and Twinings, in the English West Midlands, several examples of which remain visible on ghost signs in the region.

The character was in use at least as early as January 1929. In 1942, she was used to promote a Toc H charity concert at Birmingham Town Hall. The character was in use as late as July 1956 at least, when she was featured in an advertising competition whose results were announced on I.T.V. television by Daphne Padell.
