= John Barber (cricketer) =

English cricketer (1849–1908)

Personal information
- Full name: John Benjamin Barber
- Born: 6 February 1849; Stretford, England
- Died: 21 February 1908 (aged 59); Southwark, England
- Batting: Right-handed

Domestic team information
- Years: Team
- 1874–1876: Lancashire
- First-class debut: 17 August 1874 Lancashire v Kent
- Last First-class: 21 August 1876 Lancashire v Kent

Career statistics
Competition	First-class
Matches	3
Runs scored	39
Batting average	13.00
100s/50s	0/0
Top score	12*
Balls bowled	–
Wickets	–
Bowling average	–
5 wickets in innings	–
10 wickets in match	–
Best bowling	–
Catches/stumpings	2/–
- Source: CricketArchive, 27 November 2009

John Benjamin Barber (6 February 1849 – 21 February 1908) was an English cricketer who played three first-class matches for Lancashire County Cricket Club between 1874 and 1876.
