= Edward Barber =

Edward Barber may refer to:

- Edward Barber (VC) (1893–1915), British soldier during World War I and Victoria Cross recipient
- Edward Barber (minister) (died c. 1674), English Baptist minister
- Edward Barber (priest) (1841–1914), Anglican clergyman
- Edward Thaddeus Barleycorn Barber (1865–1948), Methodist minister on the island of Fernando Po
- Edward Barber (actor) (born 2000), British-Filipino actor
- Edward Barber (designer) (born 1966), British industrial designer
