= Arthur Barber =

English cricketer

Personal information
- Full name: Arthur Howell Barber
- Born: 13 January 1895; Ringmer, Sussex, England
- Died: 1954 (aged 59); Brighton, Sussex
- Batting: Right-handed
- Role: Bowler

Domestic team information
- Years: Team
- 1925: Essex

Career statistics
| Competition | FC |
|---|---|
| Matches | 2 |
| Runs scored | 46 |
| Batting average |
| 100s/50s |
| Top score |
| Balls bowled |
| Wickets | 1 |
| Bowling average |
| 5 wickets in innings |
| 10 wickets in match |
| Best bowling |
| Catches/stumpings |
- Source: Cricinfo, 21 July 2013

Arthur Howell Barber (13 January 1895 – 1954) was an English cricketer. He played in two first-class cricket matches for Essex in 1925.

Barber was born in Ringmer, Sussex, to Charles Barber and Fanny Howell. He took up cricket as a schoolboy and played with locals in Isfield. When the First World War broke out in August 1914, Barber was among 15 cricketers from the Ringmer Cricket Club to enlist early. He was part of the British Expeditionary Force sent to France, where he organised interbattery matches, representing the 20th Division of the Royal Field Artillery. He suffered a head wound on New Year's Eve 1914 and recovered in Sandgate, Kent.

In 1919, he returned to Bexhill-on-Sea to work as a general labourer with the railway. He was vice-captain of the Bexhill–Brighton Railway Athletic Cricket Club.
