= Barbiero =

Barbiero is an Italian surname. Notable people with the surname include:

- Fabian Barbiero (born 1984), Australian soccer player
- Michael Barbiero (born 1949), American record producer, mixer, engineer, songwriter, and journalist
