= Carl Barber =

American academic

Carl Barber (born May 28, 1956) of Birch Hills, Saskatchewan, Canada, is a pioneer in the Canadian Haskap berry growing industry. After volunteering in the University of Saskatchewan haskap breeding and growing program, Barber co-founded Haskap Central Sales Ltd, which became one of the first licensed propagators of the University of Saskatchewan haskap cultivars. In 2007, Barber, along with other shareholders founded Northern Light Orchards Ltd, one of the first commercial haskap orchards in North America. In 2007 Barber was part of a delegation funded by the Saskatchewan government to travel to Japan to determine the export potential for Canadian haskap berries. Barber is an active promoter of haskap growing in Canada and has been invited to talk to aspiring growers in the Yukon and Nova Scotia.
