= Bob Barber =

Bob, Bobby, Robert, Rob Barber may refer to:

- Bob Barber (American football) (born 1951), American NFL player with the Green Bay Packers
- Bob Barber (cricketer) (born 1935), English cricketer
- Butch Barber (Robert Ian Barber, 1943–2019), Canadian ice hockey player
- Bob Barber (rugby union) (born 1945), New Zealand rugby union player
- Bobby Barber (1894-1976), American actor
- Rob Barber (born 1983), English motorcycle racer
- Robert A. Barber Jr. (born 1949), South Carolina politician
- Robert Barber (seaman) (1749–1783), Irish quartermaster
- Robert Barber (gymnast), British gymnast
- Robert C. Barber (born 1950), American attorney and U.S. Ambassador to Iceland

== See also ==
- Robert Barbers (1944–2005), Filipino politician
