= Allison Barber =

American academic

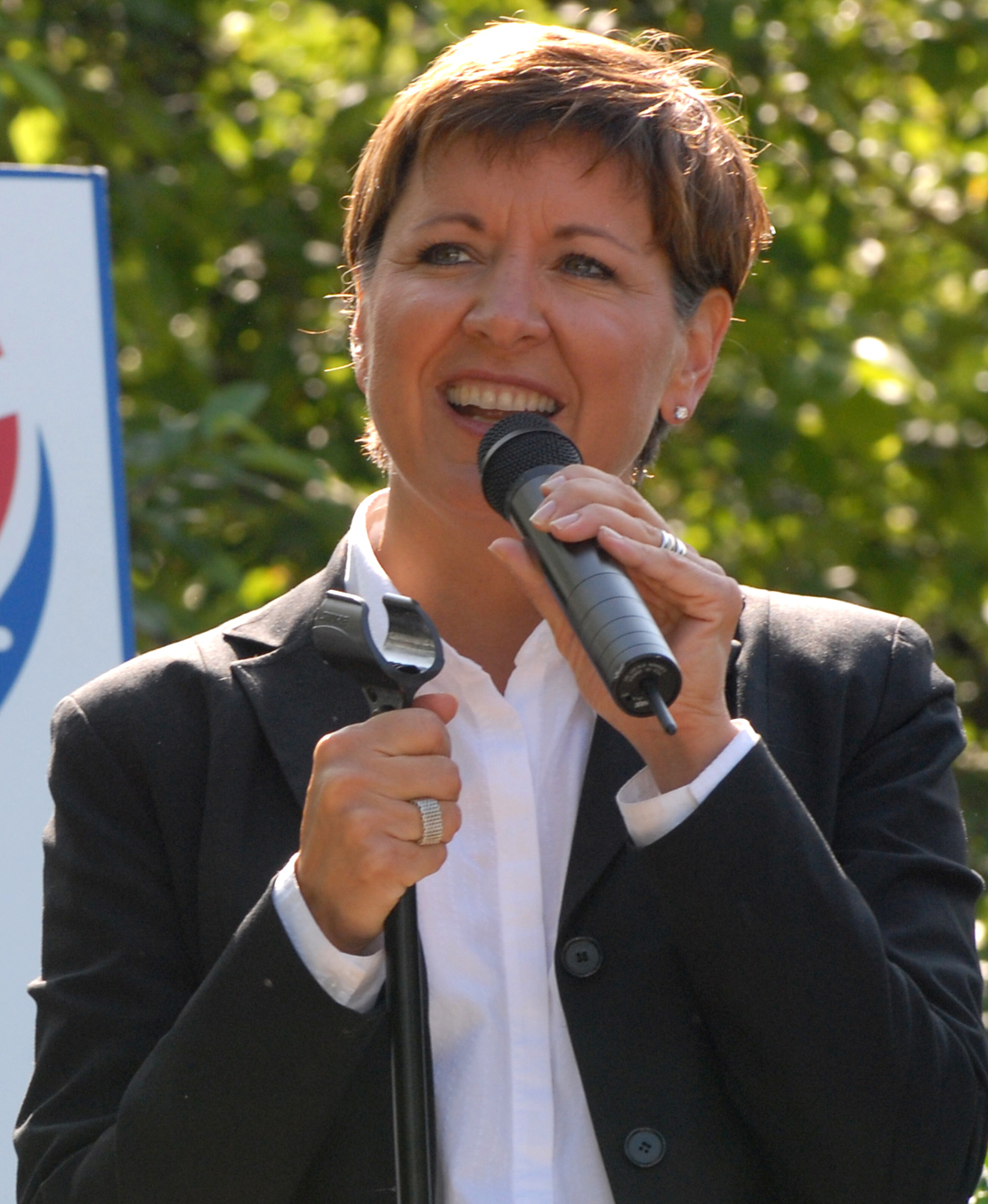
- Barber in 2007
- Education: Tennessee Temple University, BA, PhD; Indiana University Bloomington, Masters of Science in Education
- Occupations: President and chief operating officer of the Indiana Fever

Allison Barber is the past president and chief operating officer of the Indiana Fever, Indiana's WNBA franchise. Previously, she served as the Chancellor of Western Governors University Indiana, president of Sodenta, an adjunct at Georgetown University, and the Deputy Assistant Secretary of Defense for Internal Communications in the United States Department of Defense.

== Early life and education ==
Barber went to Hammond Baptist High School and studied education at Tennessee Temple University. She earned a master of science in education at Indiana University Bloomington and a doctorate of leadership at Tennessee Temple University.

== Boards of Directors ==
Barber is the Chair of the Board of Trustees for the Sagamore Institute. She was also named by Indiana Governor, Eric Holcomb, to the board of the Indiana Destination Development Corporation. She also serves on the advisory board of the Elizabeth Dole Foundation. In addition, Barber continues to serve as an American Red Cross volunteer.

== Awards ==
Barber was named Nonprofit Communicator of the Year by PR News, as well as a "Woman of Influence" by the Indianapolis Business Journal.

Barber was presented the Department of Defense Medal for Distinguished Public Service by Secretary Rumsfeld.

Barber received the Sagamore of the Wabash, presented by Governor Eric Holcomb, who described it as the "highest award in Indiana".
