= Lakia Aisha Barber =

American basketball player (born 1987)

Personal information
- Born: September 5, 1987 (age 39) Washington, DC
- Listed height: 5 ft 11 in (1.80 m)
- Listed weight: 160 lb (73 kg)

Career information
- High school: Gwynn Park (Brandywine, Maryland)
- College: Monmouth (2005–2009)
- Position: Forward

Career history
- 2009: Black Star Mersch

Lakia Barber (born September 5, 1987 in Washington, DC) is an American former basketball player. She played college basketball for Monmouth University.

== Basketball ==
=== High school career ===
Barber attended Gwynn Park High School in Brandywine, Maryland. She was four-year letterwinner in basketball at Gwynn Park High School. She helped lead her squad to a combined 91-10 record during her four seasons and won Maryland State Championships in 2003 and 2004. She also won county tournament titles in 2004 and 2005. She earned four consecutive league championship trophies and two regional titles. She posted 15.0 points and 10.0 rebounds per game as a senior, up from her 11.0/8.0 stats as a junior. She was named first-team All-Gazette and first-team all-league (3A). She was honored as Washington Post honorable mention All-Met and tabbed a McDonald's All-American nominee. She competed in the 3A/2A versus 4A All-Star Game as a senior and played in the Public vs. Private All-Star Game as well. She was also named Gwynn Park Most Valuable Player.

=== Collegiate career ===
==== Freshman season ====
Barber appeared of 27 of the team’s 28 games and shot 45-of-108 (41.7%) from the floor. She hit 20-of-30 (66.7%) free throws and pulled down 23 offensive and 22 defensive rebounds (1.7 rpg). She scored 110 points for a 4.1 points per game average. She scored career-high 14 points on 6-of-8 shooting against Navy (11/19). She tallied nine points and two steals against #9 Maryland (12/7) and scored seven points at St. Francis (N.Y.) (12/10). She contributed 11 points and five rebounds in 10 minutes at St. Francis (Pa.) (1/28), and scored 12 points in nine minutes against Wagner (2/4). She followed that up with eight points in 12 minutes at Central Connecticut State (2/6).

==== Sophomore season ====
Barber appeared in 29 games for the Hawks, making eight starts. She shot 72-of-194 (37.1%) from the field and 64-of-92 (69.6%) from the foul line. She scored 209 points on the season, averaging 7.2 points per game. She pulled down 127 rebounds while averaging 4.4 a game. She registered 14 steals, 9 blocked shots, and 16 assists for the squad. She collected 14 points while shooting seven-for-nine from the field in a win over Rider (11/17). She scored a season-high 19 points while grabbing eight rebounds and shooting 12-for-14 from the foul line against Marshall (11/23). She logged two steals, eight rebounds, and made six-out-of-seven foul shots against St. Francis [N.Y.] (12/10). She pulled down eight rebounds against Sacred Heart (1/13) and had three assists against Robert Morris (1/27). She tallied 17 points while shooting seven-for-eight from the field against Central Connecticut State (2/19). She collected a season-high ten rebounds while shooting a perfect six-for-six from the foul line in win over Fairleigh Dickinson (2/21). In March 2007, she tore her ACL in practice.

==== Junior season ====
Appeared in 30 games, averaging 7.5 points and 3.5 rebounds per game.

=== Professional career ===
She signed with Black Star Mersch prior to the 2009-2010 season. In 10 games she averaged 21.0 points and 10.5 rebounds per game.

=== Monmouth statistics ===
Legend
GP	Games played	GS	Games started	MPG	Minutes per game
FG%	Field goal percentage	3P%	3-point field goal percentage	FT%	Free throw percentage
RPG	Rebounds per game	APG	Assists per game	SPG	Steals per game
BPG	Blocks per game	PPG	Points per game	**Bold**	Career high

Year	Team	GP	Points	FG%	3P%	FT%	RPG	APG	SPG	BPG	PPG
2005-06	Monmouth	27	110	**41.7%**	0.0%	66.7%	1.7	0.3	0.2	0.1	4.1
2006-07	Monmouth	29	209	37.1%	**12.5%**	69.6%	4.4	0.6	0.5	**0.3**	7.2
2007-08	Monmouth	30	224	36.0%	0.0%	**71.9%**	3.5	0.4	0.7	0.2	7.5
2008-09	Monmouth	31	**394**	40.6%	**12.5%**	71.7%	**5.6**	**0.9**	**0.7**	0.2	**12.7**
Career		117	937	38.8%	8.3%	70.9%	3.9	0.6	0.5	0.2	8.0

== Gridiron football ==
Barber played gridiron football for the D.C. Divas in the Women's Football Alliance from 2011 to 2013.

== Personal life ==
She is the daughter of Mark and Patrice Barber, and the sister of Brittney Barber.
