= Samuel Barber (disambiguation) =

Samuel Barber (1910–1981) was an American composer.

Samuel or Sam Barber may also refer to:

- Samuel Barber (minister) (1738?–1811), Irish Presbyterian minister
- Sam Barber (baseball) (1919–1999), American baseball pitcher
- Sam Barber (singer) (born 2003), American country music singer-songwriter
