= Henry Barber =

Henry Barber may refer to:

- Henry Barber (cricketer) (1841–1924), English cricketer
- Henry Barber (rock climber) (born 1953), American rock climber
- Henry Barber (sea captain) (18th century), British sea captain who discovered McKean Island
- Sir Henry Barber, 1st Baronet (1860–1927), British property developer
