= George Barber (footballer) =

English footballer

Personal information
- Full name: George Frederick Barber
- Date of birth: 1 August 1908
- Place of birth: West Ham, London, England
- Date of death: 7 July 1974 (aged 65)
- Height: 1.86 m (6 ft 1 in)
- Position: Full-back

Senior career*
Years	Team	Apps	(Gls)
1929–1930	Luton Town		
1930–1941	Chelsea	263	(0)
- * Club domestic league appearances and goals

George Frederick Barber (1 August 1908 – 7 July 1974) was an English footballer who played as a full-back.

== Club career ==
Barber played as a defender for Chelsea, amassing 263 league appearances. After more than fifty wartime appearances for Chelsea, Barber survived World War II, and died in 1974.
