= Douglas Barber =

Canadian businessman

Douglas Barber, OC is a Canadian businessman. He is a founder and former president and CEO of Gennum Corporation, a Canadian public company that designs, manufactures and markets semiconductors and semiconductor-based products.

== Early life and education ==
Born in Saskatchewan, Barber received a Bachelor of Science degree in 1959 and a Master of Science degree in 1960 both in Electrical Engineering from the University of Saskatchewan. He received a D.I.C. and Ph.D. in Electrical Engineering in 1965 from Imperial College London.

== Career ==
In 1965, he started his career as a research engineer, manager at Westinghouse Canada. In 1973, he co-founded Linear Technology Inc. and was President and COO. In 1990, Linear Technology Inc. was rebranded as Gennum Corporation. Under his leadership, Gennum Corporation grew to over 500 employees, with subsidiaries in Japan and the United Kingdom. Gennum Corporation was later bought by Semtech for $500 million in 2012.

In 1968, Barber started teaching at McMaster University in the Department of Engineering Physics as a part-time Assistant Professor. He was appointed a part-time Associate Professor in 1974 and a part-time Professor in 1981. He retired in 1994.

Barber was actively involved in Microelectronics initiatives in Canada including the Canadian Semiconductor Technology Conference, the Canadian Microelectronics Corporation, the Sectoral Skills Council, the Canadian Semiconductor Design Association, Micronet and the Strategic Semiconductor Consortium.

== Recognition ==
In 2006, Barber was made an Officer of the Order of Canada. Other honours include Hamilton Engineer of the Year, 1996; Ontario Chamber of Commerce Outstanding Business Achievement Award, 1998; Honorary Doctor of Engineering, University of Waterloo; Honorary Doctor of Science, McMaster University; Ontario Entrepreneur of the Year-Technology, 1999.

He is a member of the Board of Governors of McMaster University and is a past Chairman.

In 2015, Barber and his wife June became the first donors to City School by Mohawk. The couple donated $70,000 to support school programs, and $30,000 to a scholarship fund for Mohawk College students who serve as peer mentors at City School. City School by Mohawk offers improved access to post-secondary education for youth, adults and seniors through tuition-free college courses, lectures and workshops. He has made philanthropic contributions to the University of Saskatchewan.
