= John Barber (clergyman) =

John Barber (died 1549) was an English clergyman and civilian.

Barber was of All Souls College, Oxford, graduated doctor of civil law and became a member of the College of Advocates in 1532. He was one of Archbishop Cranmer's chaplains, and official of his court at Canterbury, but his special vocation was to advise the archbishop on civil-law matters. In 1537 he was consulted by Cranmer on behalf of Henry VIII, on a subtle point of law touching the dower of the Duchess of Richmond, widow of the king's illegitimate son, Henry Fitzroy; and in 1538 the archbishop, in a letter to Thomas Cromwell, requests that Dr. Barbor, ‘his chaplain’ (who Jenkyns says is probably John Barber), may be one of a royal commission to try and examine whether the blood of St. Thomas of Canterbury was not ‘a feigned thing and made of some red ochre, or of such like matter.’ In the same year Cranmer used his influence with Cromwell to obtain for ‘his chaplain, Doctor Barbar,’ a prebendal stall at Christ Church, Oxford. But he does not appear to have been successful, for Dr. Barbar's name is not mentioned by Wood in his account of Christ Church. In this letter to Cromwell the archbishop speaks of Cromwell's knowledge of the ‘qualities and learning’ of Barber, and he himself calls him ‘an honest and meet man.’

Barber is probably identical, too, with the John Barbour who appeared as proctor for Anne Boleyn on the occasion of her marriage's annulment. In 1541 Cranmer appointed him to visit, as his deputy, for the second time, the college of All Souls, whose ‘compotations, ingurgitations, and enormous commessations’ had excited the archbishop's indignation (Strype, Life of Cranmer, i. 131). He is said by Rose to have assisted in the preparation of the famous ‘King's Book,’ a revised and enlarged edition of the ‘Bishops' Book,’ but his name does not appear upon the list of ‘composers.’ He was probably, however, consulted in the matter, for his signature is appended to ‘a declaration made of the functions and divine institution of priests,’ and to a Latin judgment on the rite of confirmation, both documents framed to suit the demands of the time. Barber made a poor return to Cranmer for all his kindness by joining, in 1543, a plot for his ruin. John Foxe, on the authority of Ralph Morice, Cranmer's secretary, tells us that the archbishop elicited from Barber and the suffragan of Dover a condemnation of a hypothetical case of treachery, and then by producing their letters showed that they were the guilty persons, and magnanimously forgave them. Strype says, however, that Cranmer ‘thought fit no more to trust them, and so discharged them of his service.’ Barber died in 1549, and was buried at Wrotham in Kent, of which living—a ‘peculiar’ in the patronage of the Archbishop of Canterbury—he was probably incumbent. Hasted in his list of the rectors and vicars of Wrotham leaves a blank for the period likely to cover Barber's incumbency.
