= Thomas Barber =

Thomas Barber may refer to:

== Politicians ==
- Thomas Barber (fl. 1395), MP for Leominster
- Thomas Barber (died 1439), MP for Stafford
- Thomas Barber (fl. 1402-1407), MP for Reigate

== Others ==
- Thomas Barber (painter) (1771–1843), English painter and draughtsman
- Thomas P. Barber (1832–1932), English-born American architect
- Thomas Barber (judge) (born 1966), American federal judge
- Thomas Barber (musician) (c. 1740–c. 1810), English musician and Master of the Choristers of Chichester Cathedral (1794–1801)
- Sir Thomas Barber, 3rd Baronet (1876–1961), of the Barber baronets
- Sir Thomas Barber, 4th Baronet (born 1937), of the Barber baronets
- Thomas Barber (Big Brother) (born 1996), English Big Brother contestant
- Barber County, Kansas, named for Thomas Barber, an abolitionist
- Tommy Barber (1888–1925), English footballer

== See also ==
- Tom Barber (disambiguation)
- Thomas Barbar (fl. 1587), English divine
- Thomas Barbour (1884–1946), American herpetologist
