= Keith Barber =

Keith Barber may refer to:

- Keith Barber (geographer) (1944–2017), British professor of physical geography at the University of Southampton
- Keith Barber (drummer) (1947–2005), London-born drummer
- Keith Barber (footballer) (born 1947), English former footballer
- Keith Barber, Green Party candidate in the 2003 Manitoba provincial election
