= Skull-A-Day =

Online art project featuring skulls

Skull-A-Day is an ongoing online art project/blog created by artist Noah Scalin. For its first year the site consisted of daily skull art creations made by Noah as well as weekly submissions by fans of the project. After Noah finished his project, he has continued to post daily images of skulls created by fans to the site.

== History ==
On June 4, 2007, Noah Scalin posted an orange paper cutout of a skull online with the note, “I am making a skull a day for a year”. Within weeks the site gained international recognition and began attracting a dedicated audience who participated in the project by submitting skull sightings (which were posted weekly) as well as taking part in skull themed contests.

Noah made skulls out of a wide range of materials and techniques, rarely repeating one. The skulls generally took 2–4 hours a day to make and photograph, though several took much longer. Many times the finished pieces were offered as free downloads to the community including two original fonts (Skullphabet 1 & 2), a papercraft model skull, a paint-by-numbers, a crossword puzzle, and several stencils all of which are Creative Commons licensed.

On June 2, 2008, Noah made his official last skull No. 365, though an additional skull labeled #365.25 was posted the day after since 2008 was a leap year. On June 3, 2008, the site was dubbed Skull-A-Day 2.0 and Noah began posting original skull art submissions from readers of the site daily.

On October 6, 2008, the book Skulls, based on the Skull-A-Day project, was released by Lark Books an imprint of Sterling Publishing Company, Inc. Skulls features 150 of the Skull-A-Day images, including 4 DIY projects, there is also a small selection of skulls made by fans of the project using stencils created by Noah.

On June 3, 2009, the site entered its 3rd year and became Skull-A-Day 3.0. Two new editors, Citizen Agent and Tatman, were added to the staff. In addition to the regular daily posting of reader submissions each editor also added his own weekly new skull creation. "C-Rations" appeared every Monday and "Tuesdays With Tatman" appeared every Tuesday for the duration of the 3.0 year.

On June 3, 2010, the site entered a 4th year and became Skull-A-Day 4.0. An additional editor, Azurafae, was added to the staff. Along with the regular daily postings are also weekly skulls made by this editor. "Dia de la Abby" appears every Thursday for the duration of the 4.0 year. Tutorials for these weekly skulls are available on her blog, Crafty Lady Abby.

To celebrate the start of the 5th year, June 4, 2011, has been designated by the editors of the site to be the first annual international Skull Appreciation Day.

Since the end of the original project images from Skull-A-Day have been exhibited in galleries and Noah continues to give talks on the project to businesses and universities.

== Public attention ==
Within the first few months of its creation Skull-A-Day was featured in a variety of major online media including BoingBoing, Make, Craft, Neatorama, TheAtlantic.com, USA Today's Pop Candy Blog and was chosen as a Yahoo! Pick. On March 30, 2008, the New York Times mentioned Skull-A-Day as one of many blogs being transformed into books.

The December 2007 issue of Poetry featured one of the project's skulls as a cover illustration.

On October 4, 2007, Etsy’s online magazine The Storque featured Noah making a large lace skull (#109) in their offices. The video was subsequently chosen as a YouTube Featured Video on February, 11th, 2008.

Current TV’s Show Me Your Richmond program features a segment on the making of a felt skull patch (#193) which was then given to the show's host.

On October 10, 2008, Noah Scalin was a guest on The Martha Stewart Show. He showed several of his original skull pieces, discussed the book Skulls, and made potato stamp skulls with Martha in a craft segment.

Print media have also given attention to the project including articles in the Richmond Times-Dispatch, FHM Germany, Step Magazine, Penthouse, Girls and Corpses, and Make.

At the 12th annual Webby Awards, Skull-A-Day was given 2008 People's Voice Award for Best Personal Website.
