= Harriet Barber =

English figurative painter

- Barber in 2008
- Born: Harriet Nell Barber; 3 June 1968; Chichester, England
- Died: 16 July 2014 (aged 46); Dorset, England
- Known for: Painting

Harriet Barber. Sunday Walk, Ringstead.

Harriet Nell Barber (3 June 1968 – 16 July 2014) was an English figurative painter.

== Life and work ==
Harriet Nell Barber was born in Chichester and studied at Bournemouth and Poole College of Art and Design in Dorset. She undertook her first degree at Manchester Polytechnic, studying at the Medlock campus. In 1989, she was accepted at the Slade School of Fine Art, for a two-year postgraduate Higher Diploma in Fine Art. Here she studied under Norman Norris and Euan Uglow, painting solely in the F Studio from the life models. In an environment closely associated with Uglow many of the poses adopted by the models would last for weeks, sometimes the whole term.

In 1996, she won the £1,000 student award in the NatWest 90s Prize For Art for a depiction of female bathers at Hampstead Pond.

She was selected along with Ivy Smith for the first Jerwood Art Commissions in 2000 for two paintings for the Chamber of the Royal College of Paediatrics and Child Health. The unveiling was by Michael Palin in September 2000.

Her painting, Children at Whitsand Bay, Cornwall, was used as the cover image for the BMJ journal, Archives of Disease in Childhood.

In 2008, she set up her own art business for her paintings, and one month later was diagnosed with breast cancer, from which she recovered after months of chemotherapy and radiotherapy.

In 2009, she was selected as a finalist for the Barclays Trading Places Awards, which honour those who have started a business while facing personal adversity. In 2010, her work was included in the Contemporary Gallery Artists show at Browse & Darby in Cork Street, London.

Cathy Lomax said of Barber's seascapes executed in oil on board:

Barber's paintings are refreshingly raw, colour piled on in an effort to summon up the emotion of the place rather than worrying to much about accuracies. They have an endearing hint of the naïve about them

== Personal life ==
Barber was married with two children and lived in Dorset, where she died of breast cancer on 16 July 2014, aged 46.
