= Jamie Barber =

British restaurateur

- Born: 1971 (age 54–55); Hampstead, London
- Occupations: Restaurateur; jazz pianist
- Father: Martin Barber

Jamie Barber (born in 1971 in Hampstead, London) is a British restaurateur, founder and CEO of Hush restaurant in Mayfair, London, the Hache Burgers chain and the Cabana Brazilian Barbecue group. He also founded and co-owned restaurants including Villandry, Japanese restaurant Sake No Hana, and the Italian casual dining brand, Kitchen Italia.

Barber studied at Bristol University and trained as an entertainment lawyer at media law firm Harbottle & Lewis where he acted for clients including Sir Roger Moore. In 2000, he left Harbottle & Lewis to work with Sir Roger's son, Geoffrey, to create a new venue, Hush, with founding shareholders including Evgeny Lebedev, Geoffrey and Sir Roger Moore. He has since opened two smaller Hush brasseries in Holborn, and St Paul's in May 2013. In May 2014, Hush Mayfair received the prestigious "Test of Time" award at the Tatler Restaurant Awards. The award recognises restaurants over 10 years old which, in the words of host/Tatler Restaurant Awards editor Jeremy Wayne, "are still as good as the day they opened". In 2017, Hush's popular cocktail bar, Aviator, received the "Best Bar in London" award at the London Club & Bar Awards.

In November 2011, Barber and his business partner, Momo Restaurant founder David Ponté, opened Cabana, a small group of casual Brazilian street food restaurants.

In May 2015, Barber became one of a high-profile consortium, dubbed the 'super eight', to have backed a £5m funding round for Reds True Barbecue, a fast-growing chain of Yorkshire smokehouse restaurants. Barber also acts as a Board Advisor for Zing Zing, the London-based Chinese takeaway start-up, which caught the eye of Goldman Sachs vice chairman Michael Sherwood, alongside 230 other armchair investors on Crowdcube.

The following year Barber teamed up with fellow restaurateurs Ed Standring, the former managing director of Richoux Group, and Ian Neill, former chief executive of Wagamama, to buy gourmet burger restaurant group Haché. The group have refurbished the five existing London restaurants and have now opened a sixth in Holborn and a seventh in Kingston.

In July 2021, Barber and former Hear'Say singer Myleene Klass founded My Supper Hero—a finish-at-home meal kit start-up which launched to the public in October 2021.

In recognition of the contribution Barber has made to the restaurant business, he was nominated at the Tatler Restaurant Awards for "Outstanding Contribution to London Restaurants".

== Personal life ==
Barber is a jazz pianist, and has produced and written for a band called Primitiva, signed to Warner Chappell Music and George Michael's record label, Aegean Records. He is the son of Martin Barber, property entrepreneur and founder of Capital & Regional Properties, and the brother of author Lizzy Barber. He is married to Clare and has a daughter.
