= Charles Williams Barber =

American army officer

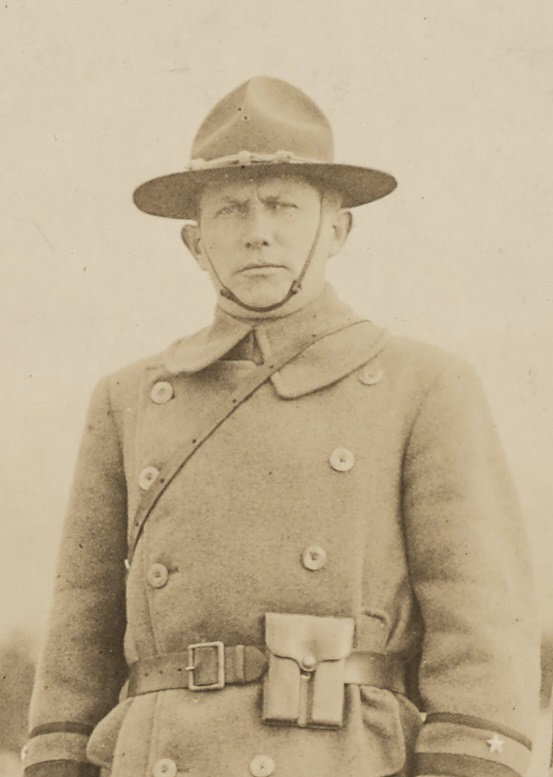
- Charles Barber in Camp McClellan, February 1918
- Born: October 21, 1872
- Died: January 7, 1943 (aged 70)
- Military career
- Branch: United States Army
- Rank: Brigadier General
- Service number: 0-13857

Charles Williams Barber (September 21, 1872 – January 7, 1943) was an army officer and an American Brigadier general active during World War I.

== Early life ==
Barber was born in Gloucester County, New Jersey. He attended Pierce Business College in Philadelphia before studying law in the office of H.S. Grey, former attorney general of New Jersey.

== Career ==
Barber was commissioned a second lieutenant in the Fourth New Jersey Infantry for the Spanish–American War on July 16, 1898, and was made first lieutenant on September 27 of the same year. On March 3, he was made captain but was mustered out on April 6 of the same year. He was made first lieutenant of the 28th United States Volunteer Infantry on July 5, 1899, but was again mustered out on May 1, 1901. On February 2, 1901, he was commissioned a second lieutenant, Second Infantry, and was promoted to first lieutenant by November 11 of the same year. He remained first lieutenant for almost ten years. During his time as first lieutenant, he served in the Philippines several times. From 1908 to 1915, Barber was with the Panama Canal Commission and retired as a major, Third Infantry, on September 1, 1916.

He then served on the Mexican border, after which he became the adjutant general of New Jersey from December 1916 to July 1917. He was made a brigadier general of the National Army on July 16, 1917.

From July to August 1917, he commanded the 29th Infantry Division, and on September 11 of the same year, he took command of the 57th Infantry Brigade at Camp McClellan, Alabama. He took this brigade to France and commanded it in front line sectors. He was a General Staff officer and also commanded Base Section Number 2 in Bordeaux until July 1919.

Upon his return to the United States, Barber retired as a colonel. After retiring Barber was a representative of the Atlantic Refining Company in Mexico, had his own investment banking company, and was a director on the boards of several corporations.

His rank of brigadier general was restored by an act of Congress in June 1930.

== Awards ==
Charles Williams Barber was awarded the Distinguished Service Medal from both the United States and the state of New Jersey. He was also awarded the Legion of Honor from France, and the Military Order of the Carabao.

== Death and legacy ==
Charles Williams Barber died at the age of seventy on January 7, 1943. He is buried at Arlington National Cemetery.

== Bibliography ==
- Davis, Henry Blaine Jr. Generals in Khaki. Raleigh, NC: Pentland Press, 1998. ISBN 1571970886 OCLC 231779136
- Herringshaw, Thomas William. 1912. Herringshaw's American blue-book of biography; prominent Americans of ... An accurate biographical record of prominent citizens in all walks of life. Chicago, Ill: American Publishers' Association. OCLC 191708261
- Marquis Who's Who, Inc. Who Was Who in American History, the Military. Chicago: Marquis Who's Who, 1975. ISBN 0837932017 OCLC 657162692
