= Trevor Barber =

New Zealand cricketer

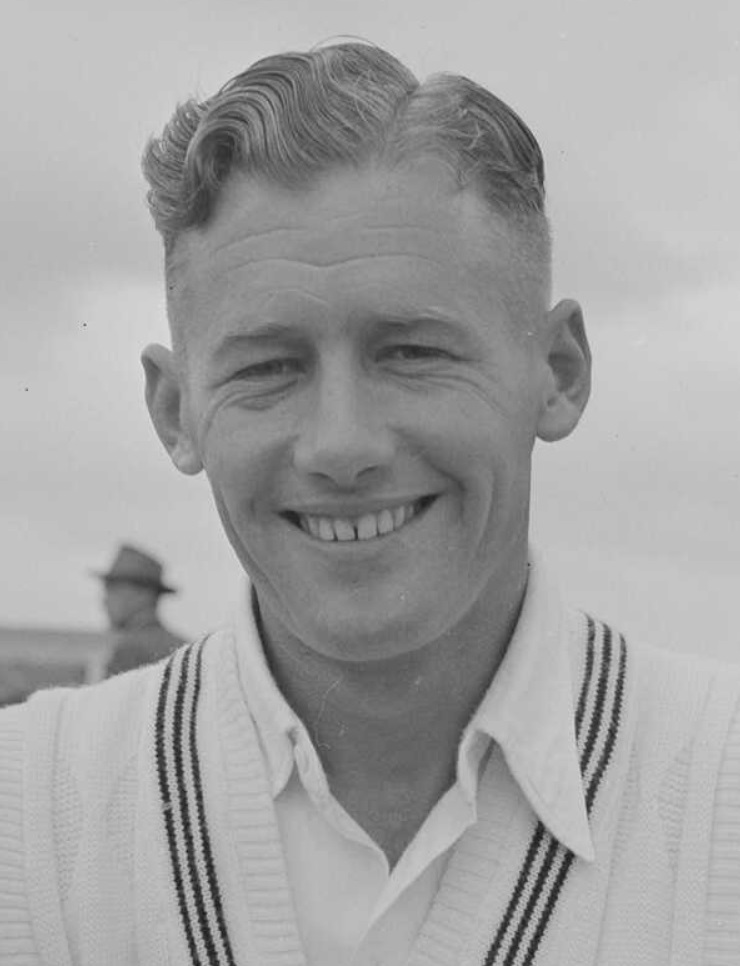
- Barber in 1956

Personal information
- Born: 3 June 1925; Ōtaki, Wellington, New Zealand
- Died: 7 August 2015 (aged 90); Christchurch, New Zealand
- Batting: Right-handed

International information
- National side: New Zealand
- Only Test (cap 80): 3 March 1956 v West Indies

Domestic team information
- Years: Team
- 1945/46–1958/59: Wellington
- 1959/60: Central Districts

Career statistics
Competition	Test	First-class
Matches	1	49
Runs scored	17	2,002
Batting average	8.50	23.01
100s/50s	0/0	1/14
Top score	12	117
Catches/stumpings	1/–	61/2
- Source: Cricinfo, 1 April 2017

Richard Trevor Barber (3 June 1925 – 7 August 2015) was a New Zealand cricketer who played in one Test match against the West Indies at Wellington in 1956. He played first-class cricket in New Zealand from 1945 to 1960.

== Life and career ==
Barber was born in Ōtaki, on the Kāpiti Coast north of Wellington, where his family had a dairy farm. He attended Wellington College as a boarder.

A middle-order batsman, Barber played for Wellington from 1945–46 to 1958–59, and for Central Districts in 1959–60. He scored his only century, 117, against Otago in Wellington in 1953–54, which was also one of the two Plunket Shield matches in which he kept wicket. He captained Wellington in 1950-51 and 1951–52, and from 1955–56 to 1957–58, and Central Districts in 1959–60. Wellington won the Shield under his captaincy in 1956–57. In a trial match between North Island and South Island in February 1958 he was the only player on either side to score fifty, with 51 in North Island's second innings, but he was not selected for the subsequent tour of England.

Dick Brittenden wrote that Barber "could field anywhere with distinction", especially slips and gully, and that "his cover drive, produced from the best blend of balance and timing, was for the connoisseur". However, it was widely held that his impatience prevented him from achieving his full potential as a batsman.

Barber worked for the Shell Oil Company, where he was responsible for its sponsorship of cricket and golf. On the death of Sammy Guillen on 1 March 2013, Barber became the oldest surviving New Zealand Test cricketer. Following his death aged 90 in August 2015, John Reid became the oldest surviving New Zealand Test cricketer.
