= Barbieri =

Barbieri is an Italian surname. Notable people with the surname include:

- Alberto Barbieri (general) (1882–...), Italian Army Corps General
- Alberto Barbieri (academic), Argentine academic
- Alessandro Barbieri (snowboarder) (born 2008), American snowboarder
- Alice Barbieri (born 2001), American soccer player
- Andrea Barbieri (born 1965), Argentine actress
- Anthony Barbieri (born 1963), American writer and performer
- Antonio María Barbieri (1892–1979), Uruguayan cardinal
- Bruno Barbieri (born 1962), Italian chef
- Carmen Barbieri (born 1955), Argentine actress
- Emerenzio Barbieri (1946–2025), Italian politician
- Fedora Barbieri (1920–2003), Italian singer
- Francesco Barbieri (1623–1698), Italian painter
- Francisco Asenjo Barbieri (1823–1894), Spanish composer
- Gabi Barbieri (born 2003), Brazilian professional footballer
- Gato Barbieri (1932–2016), Argentine saxophone player
- Gian Paolo Barbieri (1935–2024), Italian fashion photographer
- Giovanni Francesco Barbieri (1591–1666), Italian painter known as Guercino
- Juan Carlos Barbieri (1932–1996), Argentine actor
- Lara Barbieri (born 1986), Italian footballer
- Marcello Barbieri (born 1940), Italian theoretical biologist
- Mariano Barbieri (born 1990), Argentine footballer
- Melissa Barbieri (born 1980), Australian football goalkeeper
- Michael Barbieri (politician) (born 1949), American politician
- Michael Barbieri (actor) (born 2002), American actor
- Miguel Barbieri (born 1993), Argentine footballer
- Olivo Barbieri (born 1954), Italian artist
- Pierpaolo Barbieri (born 1987), Argentine historian and businessman
- Rachele Barbieri (born 1997), Italian cyclist
- Ralph Barbieri (1946–2020), American sports radio personality
- Ray Barbieri (20th century), American musician
- Renzo Barbieri (1940–2007), Italian author
- Richard Barbieri (born 1957), English musician
- Robert Barbieri (born 1984), Canadian-born Italian rugby player
- Simone Barbieri (born 1992), Italian archer
- Sante Uberto Barbieri (1902–?), Italian Bishop
- Teresita de Barbieri (1937–2018), Uruguayan-born Mexican feminist sociologist
- Vicente Barbieri (1903–1956), Argentine poet

== See also ==
- Robert Barbers (1944–2005), Filipino politician; his surname was originally spelled Barbieri
- Angus Barbieri's fast
