= Kris Barber =

Canadian ice dancer

Personal information
- Full name: Kris Barber

Figure skating career
- Country: Canada
- Skating club: TCS & CC; Upper Canada SC

Kris Barber is a Canadian ice dancer. With partner Kelly Johnson, he is the 1981 & 1982 Canadian silver medalist, the 1978 World junior silver medalist, and the 1979 World junior bronze medalist.

== Competitive highlights ==
(with Johnson)

Event	1977-78	1978-79	1979-80	1980-81	1981-82
World Championships					12th
World Junior Championships	2nd	3rd			
Canadian Championships		1st J.		2nd	2nd
Skate Canada International				5th	6th
NHK Trophy					6th

- J = Junior level
