= Jim Barber (ventriloquist) =

American comedian ventriloquist

Jim Barber (left) with "Seville" and "Diva"

Jim Barber is an American ventriloquist, comedian and singer who performs internationally.

== Unique comedy act ==
Barber is best known for his unusual performance in which "Seville," his dummy, actually appears to be holding Barber, contrary to the more orthodox way used by his peers. One of Barber's more popular routines involves "Diva," a female dummy which appears to be operated by Seville (with Barber on the other side), with all three engaged in an operatic song from The Barber of Seville — part of the pun from which the name of Barber's act, "Jim Barber and Seville," is taken.

== Awards & television appearances ==
Barber has been named "Ventriloquist of the Year" in 2006 by the International Magicians Society, "Ventriloquist of the Year" in 1984 by the Vent Haven International Ventriloquist ConVENTion, "Comedy Entertainer of the Year" by the National Association of Campus Activities, and one of the "Funniest People in America" by Showtime/The Movie Channel for his technical vocal skills and creative approach. He was featured in a performance during "Ventriloquist Week" on February 15, 2007 on the Late Show with David Letterman which aired again that April. He has also appeared on many other television shows on NBC, CBS, ABC, Fox, A&E, and TNN.

== Branson, Missouri ==
Barber co-starred in the Hamner Barber Variety Show in Branson, Missouri from 2004 to 2013. His first work in the resort city was as a featured comedian in the Glen Campbell Goodtime Show. He also worked in Branson with The Osmonds, Tony Orlando, Yakov Smirnoff, Bobby Vinton and Eddie Rabbitt. Elsewhere Barber has appeared on the Late Show with David Letterman, Jerry Lewis MDA Telethon, The Nashville Network, A&E, Fox, ABC, and NBC. Barber has also been featured in Las Vegas, Reno, Atlantic City, New Jersey, dozens of Cruise Ships around the world, and on USO shows visiting American troops abroad.

== Business ventures ==
Jim Barber has a background in entertainment marketing and for ten years promoted and performed at the Hamner Barber Theater, a 640-seat venue in Branson, Missouri. In 2014 Jim was hired as Campaign Chairman to renew Branson's Tourism Community Enhancement District sales tax which successfully passed with a 76.7% approval by the resident voters. Barber also co-owned a video production, graphic design and publishing company, having personally developed projects for Silver Dollar City, Big Cedar Lodge, Glen Campbell, Jimmy Osmond, Yakov Smirnoff, Pierce Arrow, Clay Cooper, Paul Harris and Tony Orlando among others. Barber has served as the Executive Director of the Branson Regional Arts Council from 2017-2024.

Since May 2021, Barber has also hosted a daily radio show in Branson, MO at 98.1fm or online at Branson4u.com.
