= Danny Barber (soccer) =

American soccer player

Personal information
- Full name: Daniel Barber
- Date of birth: May 17, 1971 (age 55)
- Place of birth: Bellflower, California, United States
- Height: 5 ft 8 in (1.73 m)
- Position: Midfielder

Youth career
- 1989–1992: UNLV

Senior career*
Years	Team	Apps	(Gls)
1994–1995	Las Vegas Dustdevils (indoor)	56	(59)
1996	MetroStars	1	(0)
1996–1998	Cincinnati Silverbacks (indoor)	75	(52)
1998–2001	Buffalo Blizzard (indoor)	114	(74)
2001–2002	Baltimore Blast (indoor)	21	(2)
2002	Harrisburg Heat (indoor)	17	(5)
2002	Dallas Sidekicks (indoor)	9	(1)
2002	Baltimore Blast (indoor)	4	(0)
Total		297	(193)
- * Club domestic league appearances and goals

Danny Barber (born May 17, 1971, in Bellflower, California) is a retired U.S. soccer midfielder who played one game with the MetroStars in Major League Soccer. He spent most of his career playing indoor soccer in the Continental Indoor Soccer League, National Professional Soccer League and second Major Indoor Soccer League.

== Youth ==
Barber graduated from Pacifica High School in Garden Grove, California. He then attended UNLV, playing on the men's soccer team from 1989 to 1992. He holds the school's career assists record with 26.

== Professional ==
Barber joined the roster of the newly established Las Vegas Dustdevils in the Continental Indoor Soccer League. That season, the Dustdevils won the CISL championship He continued to play for the Dustdevils in 1995.

In February 1996, the MetroStars selected Barber in the 3rd round (22nd overall) of the 1996 MLS Supplemental Draft. He played one game for them.

In the fall of 1996, Barber signed with Cincinnati Silverbacks in the National Professional Soccer League. The Silverbacks folded following the 1997–1998 season and Barber moved to the Buffalo Blizzard. He remained with the Blizzard until the team folded in the spring of 2001. He then began the 2001–2002 season with the Baltimore Blast in the newly established Major Indoor Soccer League. He played twenty-one games for the Blast before being traded to the Harrisburg Heat in exchange for Lester Felician on February 18, 2002. He finished the season in Harrisburg. On September 9, 2002, the Heat traded Barber, the rights to Justin Labrum and financial considerations to the Dallas Sidekicks in exchange for Marco Coria, Genoni Martinez and Raul Salas. He played nine games for the Sidekicks at the beginning of the 2002–2003 season before being released on October 14, 2002. On December 2, 2002, the Baltimore Blast signed Barber to a 15-day/5-game contract. He played four of those five games then was released. On July 23, 2003, the St. Louis Steamers selected Barber in the 11th Round of the 2003 MISL Expansion Draft. However, he never played for the team.
