= Ray Barber (singer) =

American singer

Ray Barber (January 8, 1923 – June 30, 2009), born Michael Joseph Barbetta, was an American singer in the early 1950s. He recorded with Mercury Records.

He had a hit overseas in the UK entitled "Mary Rose". He was recording the song "Because Of You" when a young Tony Bennett was in the studio and heard it for the first time. In the early part of his career he was a regular on the Arthur Godfrey's Talent Scouts under the name of Johnny Caruso. He performed in the Catskills in the 1960s and early 1970s with Phyllis Diller and Soupy Sales. Later he moved to the small town of Plant City, Florida to retire and settle down with his wife Marie. When she died of cancer, he took up singing again. He amassed a following of fans in the local clubs until his death.

Ray Barber died on June 30, 2009, in the Plant City Florida hospital. He was buried in New York City next to his wife.
