= Barber (disambiguation) =

A barber is a person who cuts, dresses, grooms, styles and shaves men's and boy's hair or beards.

Barber may also refer to:

== People and fictional characters ==
- Barber (surname), including a list of people and fictional characters
- Barber Conable (1922–2003), American politician and President of the World Bank Group
- John Factor (1892–1984), also known as "The Barber", Prohibition-era gangster and con artist affiliated with the Chicago Outfit

== Places ==
=== United States ===
- Barber, California, a neighborhood of Chico
- Barber County, Kansas
- Barber Township, Minnesota
- Barber, New Jersey, a former name of Maurer, Perth Amboy
- Barber, Oklahoma, an unincorporated community and census-designated place
- Barber Creek, Georgia
- Barber Peak, New Mexico

=== Elsewhere ===
- Barber, Curaçao, a town
- Barber Island, Queensland, Australia
- Barber Lake (Alberta), Canada
- Barber Lake (Nova Scotia), Canada

== Sports ==
- Barber Motorsports Park, a racing facility in Birmingham, Alabama, United States
- Barber Pro Series, a professional open-wheel auto racing series from 1986 to 2003
- Centro Social Deportivo Barber, a football team based in Barber, Curaçao

== Transportation ==
- Barber Asphalt Company, an American asphalt and shipping company from 1883 to 1981
- Barber Steamship Lines, an American shipping company from 1902 to 1978
- Barber Airport, Alliance, Ohio, United States, a privately owned, public-use airport
- La Ronge (Barber Field) Airport, near La Ronge, Saskatchewan, Canada

== Other uses ==
- Barber Institute of Fine Arts, an art gallery and concert hall in Birmingham, England
- Barber (film), a 2023 Irish thriller film
- Barber baronets, two titles in the Baronetage of the United Kingdom, one extinct, one extant
- Barber coinage, former coin designs of United States dimes, quarters, and half dollars
- USS Barber, a destroyer which served in World War II

== See also ==
- Barbers, Georgia, United States, an unincorporated community
- The Barber (disambiguation)
- Barber Cup and Crawford Cup, two non-matching cups dating from 50–100 AD
- Barber Block, a building complex in Portland, Oregon, United States, on the National Register of Historic Places
- Barber Dam, Idaho, United States
- Barber House (disambiguation), various houses on the United States National Register of Historic Places
- Barber perch, also called the barber sea perch or Tasmanian barber
- Barber surgeon, a medical practitioner of medieval Europe
- Barber paradox, a paradox in logic and mathematics
- Barbour (disambiguation)
