= Barbour =

Barbour is a surname of Scottish origin. Notable people with the surname include:

- Alexander Barbour (1862–1930), Scottish international footballer
- Amy Louise Barbour (1869–1950), American classics scholar
- Andrea Barbour, Canadian politician
- Anna Maynard Barbour (d.1941), an American author
- Clitus Barbour (1837–1906), American attorney and politician
- Conway Barbour (1818–1876), American former slave and Arkansas state legislator
- Dave Barbour (1912–1965), an American jazz guitarist
- Edward A. Barbour Jr., an American politician
- Eilidh Barbour (b.1982), Scottish television presenter and reporter
- Erwin Hinckley Barbour (1856–1947), an American geologist and paleontologist
- George Brown Barbour (1890–1977), Scottish geologist and educator
- Haley Reeves Barbour (b.1947), an American attorney, politician, and lobbyist who served as the 63rd Governor of Mississippi
- Henry Gray Barbour (1886–1943), American physiologist and pharmacologist
- Ian Barbour (1923–2013), an American scholar on the relationship between science and religion
- James Barbour (1775–1842), the 18th Governor of Virginia, U.S. Senator, and United States Secretary of War
- James Barbour (1828–1895), Virginia lawyer, planter, politician, and Confederate officer
- James Stacy Barbour (born 1966), an American singer and theatre actor
- John Barbour (c. 1320–1395), a Scottish poet and the first major named literary figure to write in Scots
- John Barbour (actor) (b.1933), a Canadian actor, comedian, and television host who has worked extensively in the United States
- John S. Barbour Jr. (1820–1892), a U.S. Representative and a Senator from Virginia
- Josephus Pius Barbour (1894–1974), American Baptist pastor
- Julian Barbour (b.1937), a British physicist with research interests in quantum gravity and the history of science
- Liz Barbour, American politician
- Lyndall Barbour (1916–1986), Australian actress
- Lucius A. Barbour (1846–1922), American general
- Mary Barbour (1875–1958), a Scottish political activist
- Nelson H. Barbour (1824–1905), a Millerite Adventist writer and publisher
- Philip Lemont Barbour (1898–1980), an American linguist, historian, and radio broadcaster
- Philip P. Barbour (1783–1841), 10th Speaker of the U.S. House of Representatives and an associate justice of the U.S. Supreme Court, brother of James Barbour
- Ralph Henry Barbour (1870–1944), an American author of sports fiction for boys
- Robert Barbour (New South Wales politician) (1827–1895), Australian politician, merchant, and squatter
- Robert Barbour (Victorian politician) (c. 1845–1914), Australian politician
- Robert Barbour (RAF officer) (1895–1980), Scottish World War I flying ace
- Robert Barbour (cricketer) (1899–1994), Australian cricketer
- Robin Barbour (1921–2014), Church of Scotland minister and author
- Samuel Barbour (1860–1938), an Australian chemist, photographer, and X-ray pioneer
- Thomas Barbour (1884–1946), an American herpetologist
- Thomas Barbour Lathrop (1847–1927), an American philanthropist and world traveler, grandson of James Barbour
- Tommy Barbour (1887–1967), Scottish footballer
- Walworth Barbour (1908–1982), a United States Ambassador to Israel
- William Warren Barbour (1888–1943), a US Senator from New Jersey

Notable people with the given name Barbour include:

- Arthur Bruce Barbour Moore (1906–2004), Canadian Moderator of the United Church of Canada, President and Vice-Chancellor of Victoria University in the University of Toronto
- Barbour Lewis (1818–1893), an American politician and a member of the U.S. House of Representatives for Tennessee

== See also ==
- Barbour County, Alabama
- Barbour County, West Virginia
- Barbour (company), a British clothing manufacturer
- Mount Barbour, a mountain in Canada
- Barber (disambiguation)
