= Barber Lake =

Barber Lake may refer to:

- Barber Lake (Alberta), Canada
- Barber Lake (Nova Scotia), Canada
