= Gustave Bartman House =

Historic house in Portland, Oregon, U.S.

- U.S. National Register of Historic Places
- Portland Historic Landmark
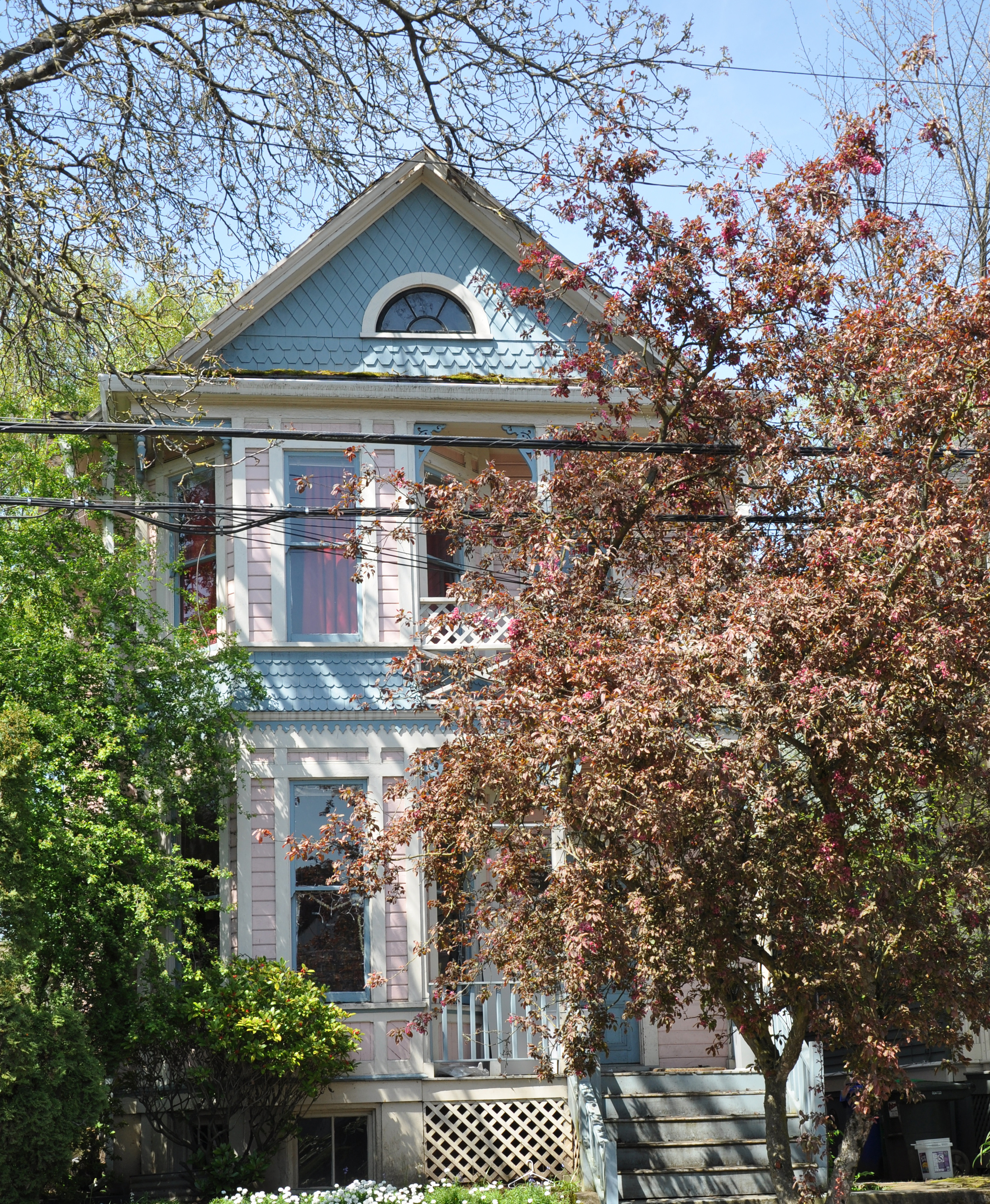
- The Bartman House in 2011
- Location: 1817 SE 12th Avenue; Portland, Oregon
- Coordinates: 45°30′35″N 122°39′14″W
- Built: 1892
- Architectural style: Queen Anne
- NRHP reference No.: 89000098
- Added to NRHP: March 8, 1989

The Gustave Bartman House in southeast Portland in the U.S. state of Oregon is a two-and-a-half-story dwelling listed on the National Register of Historic Places. A Queen Anne structure built in 1892, it was added to the register in 1989. Bartman, a contractor, may have built the house.

The interior of the house consists of two essentially identical apartments, one on each floor. Designed during the Victorian era, the structure is a well-preserved example of a southeast Portland duplex. It was built just one year after the city of East Portland became part of the growing city of Portland. Notable features include a full-height window bay, imbricated shingles, and a double veranda.

== See also ==
- National Register of Historic Places listings in Southeast Portland, Oregon
