= Philip Barber =

Philip Barber may refer to:

- Major Philip Hedley Barber, see 2006 New Year Honours
- Sir Philip Barber, 1st Baronet (1876–1961) of the Barber Baronets
- Phil Barber (born 1965), English footballer

== See also ==
- Barber (disambiguation)
