= Philip Barbour =

Philip Barbour may refer to:

- Philip Lemont Barbour (1898–1980), American linguist, historian and radio broadcaster
- Philip P. Barbour (1783–1841), American politician and judge
