= Athens Confederate Monument =

Confederate monument in Athens, Georgia, United States

Coordinates: 33.916°N 83.398°W

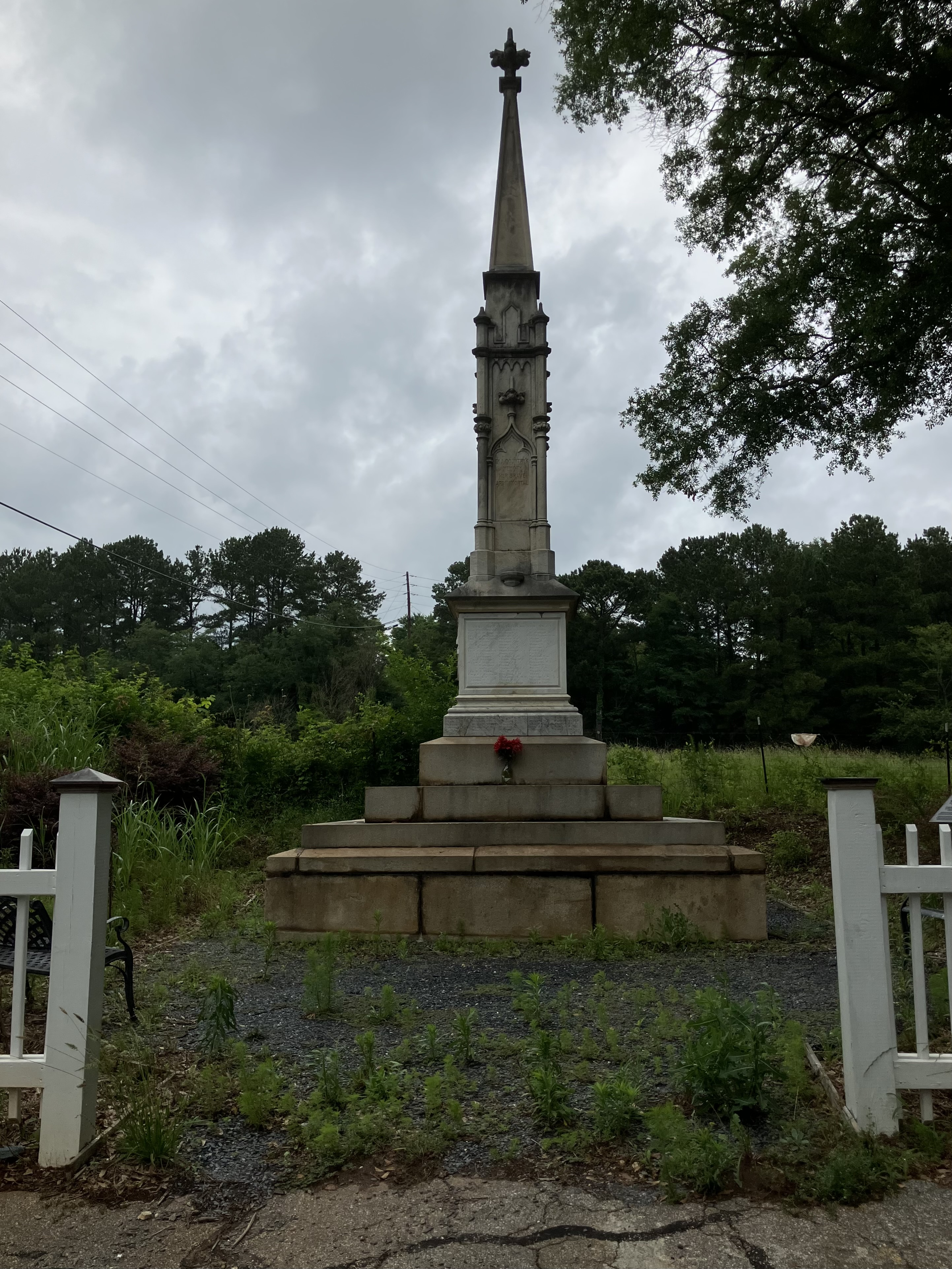
- The monument in 2025
- Year: 1872
- Medium: Marble; granite (base)
- Location: Athens, Georgia, U.S.

The Athens Confederate Monument is a Confederate memorial near Barber Creek in Athens, Georgia, United States. It is a Carrara marble obelisk mounted on a granite foundation engraved with names of the city's soldiers who were killed during the American Civil War. It was formerly located in the median strip of Broad Street in the Downtown Local Historic District of Athens until it was removed in 2020 and placed at its current site in 2021.

== Description ==
The monument is made up of two different sections, an obelisk made of Carrara marble that has six shafts, and a granite base. Only the marble obelisk is engraved. The names of white Confederate soldiers from Athens who were killed during the Civil War are inscribed on the marble. A veteran of the war called for the names to be arranged in alphabetical order rather than by rank so none of their deaths would be perceived as greater than the others, but his request was left unfulfilled. The master of a local Masonic Lodge, William King, included a time capsule in the monument's cornerstone. The time capsule, which according to an interview with William King contains Confederate memorabilia and a list of Athens Freemasons, was removed after the monument's most recent relocation.

== History ==
The monument was one of the first monuments to the casualties of the American Civil War to be raised in the South after the war's conclusion. Construction of the monument began on May 5, 1871, and was completed on June 3, 1872, at the cost of $4,444.44 (about $111,363 in 2023) raised by the Ladies' Memorial Association from the residents of the city, though another professor at the university, Akela Reason, proposed that it was actually funded by the city's wealthy men because "it would have been easier for women to build a memorial mourning the dead than for men to build one in defiance." It has been moved three times since it was first erected at the intersection of College Avenue and Washington Street. It was first moved north one block to the center of College Avenue, but was relocated again in 1912 when it caused congestion there. It then stood in the median of Broad Street until August 10, 2020.

=== 2020-2021 relocation ===
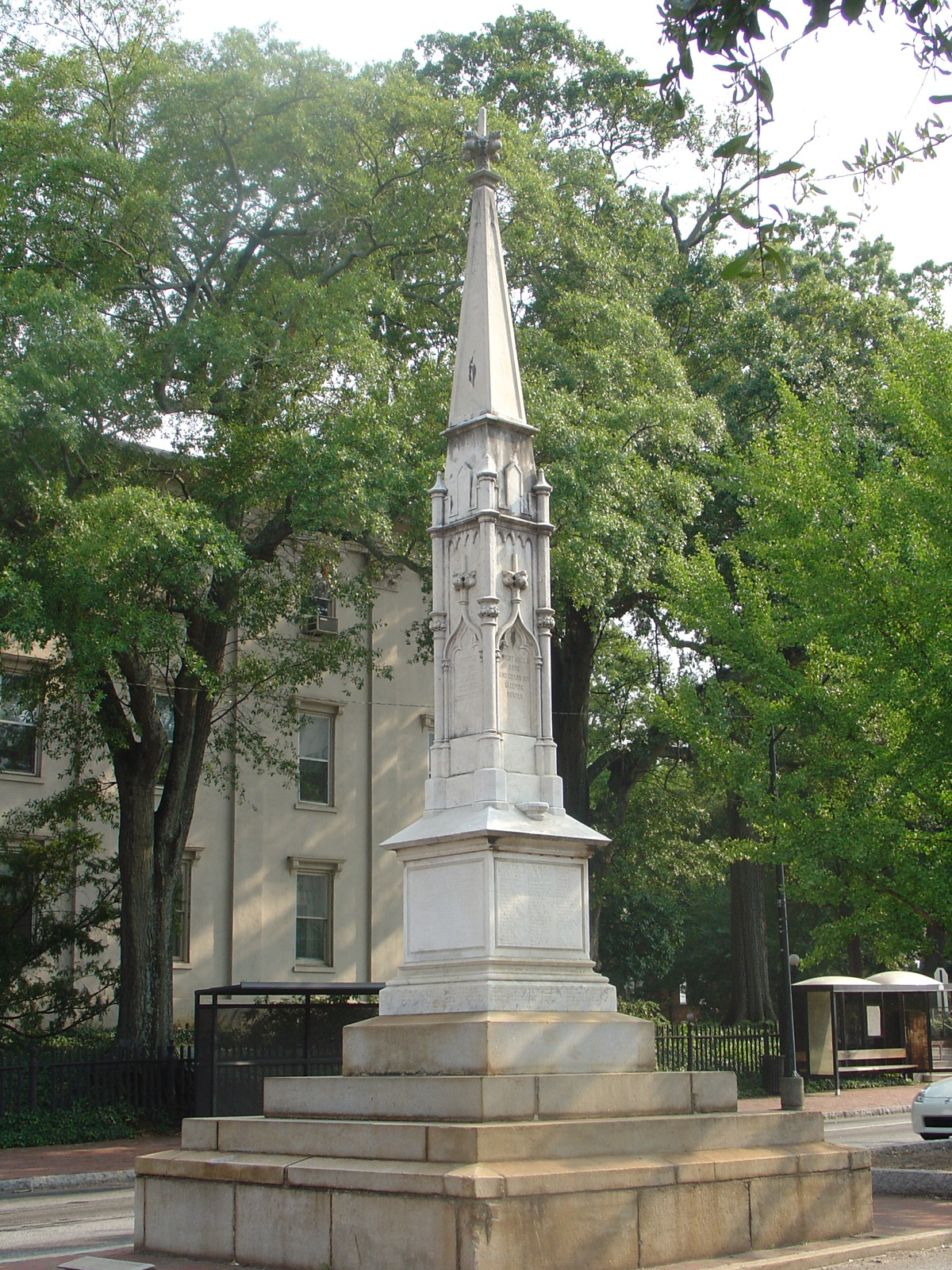
The monument prior to its relocation in 2020-1

Discussions by the city and local activists to remove the monument began after the Charleston church shooting in 2015. After the murder of George Floyd by Minneapolis police the area around the monument became the rally point for the city's protest. Protesters called for the monument to be removed.

In response to the local outcry it was planned for the monument to be moved again from the intersection of Broad Street and College Avenue in downtown Athens in 2020 by Athens mayor, Kelly Girtz. The mayor's desire to move the monument was challenged by Senate Bill 77, which prevents the city from moving Confederate monuments from prominent locations to another of lower prominence, but a loophole in the bill allowed the monument to be removed. On June 16, 2020, the mayor proposed a $450,000 plan to move the monument from Broad Street to Timothy Place. The mayor's plan was approved by the city commissioners on June 25 as part of a project to make the surrounding area more pedestrian-friendly.

Work began on August 10 to remove the monument from the intersection at Broad Street. It was being moved according to the plan approved by the city's commissioners on June 25, but was temporarily stored in a field due to size restrictions until it could be installed on a new foundation. By June 2021, the memorial was partially reassembled, with the base of the structure already in place, at its current location at the end of Timothy Place visible from the Athens Perimeter. Its current placement is near the site of the Battle of Barber Creek, a skirmish that occurred on August 2, 1864, between a detachment of General George Stoneman's cavalry forces and the Athens Home Guard during the Atlanta campaign.

== See also ==
- List of monuments and memorials removed during the George Floyd protests
