= Modillion =

Ornate supporting bracket in architecture

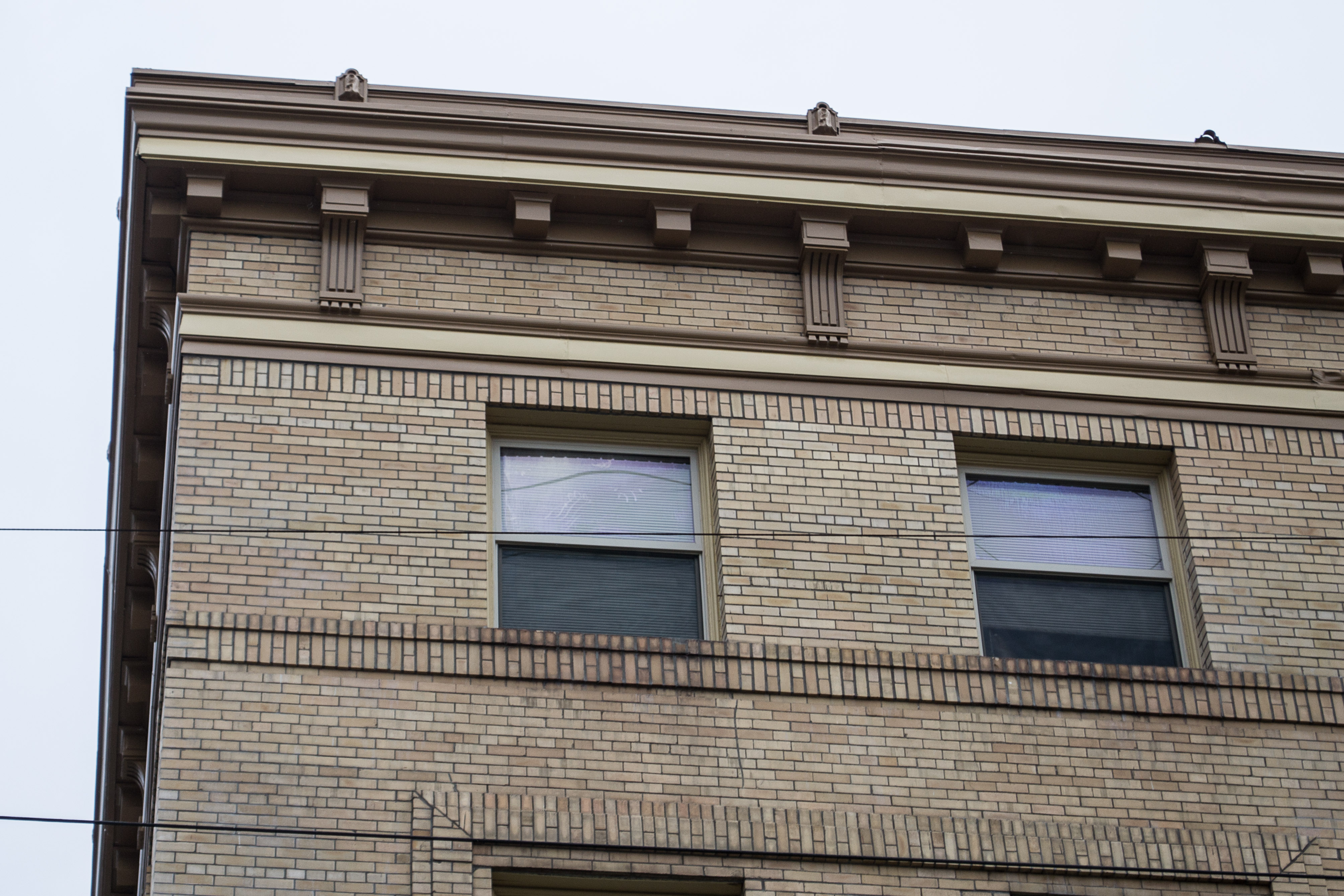
Modillions under the cornice of the Morgan, Leith, and Cook Building in the East Portland Grand Avenue Historic District, Portland, Oregon

In architecture, a modillion is an ornate bracket, more horizontal in shape and less imposing than a corbel. They are often seen underneath a cornice which helps to support them. Modillions are more elaborate than dentils (literally translated as small teeth). All three are selectively used as adjectival historic past participles (corbelled, modillioned, dentillated) as to what co-supports or simply adorns any high structure of a building, such as a terrace of a roof (a flat area of a roof), parapet, pediment/entablature, balcony, cornice band or roof cornice. Modillions occur classically under a Corinthian or a Composite cornice but may support any type of eaves cornice. They may be carved or plain.

== See also ==
- Glossary of architecture

== Gallery ==
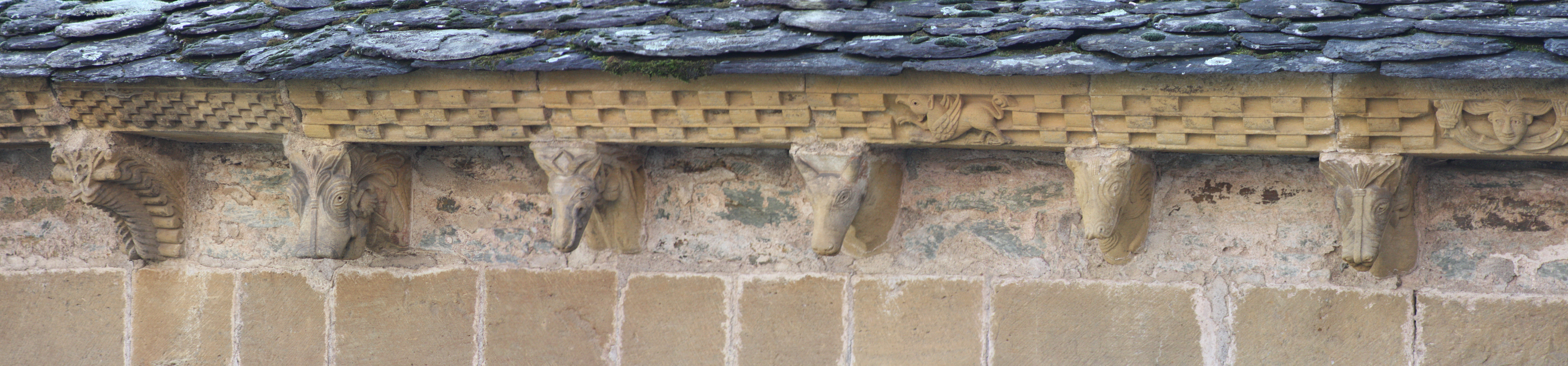
Modillions carved with animal heads in the Abbaye Ste Foy in Conques (France).

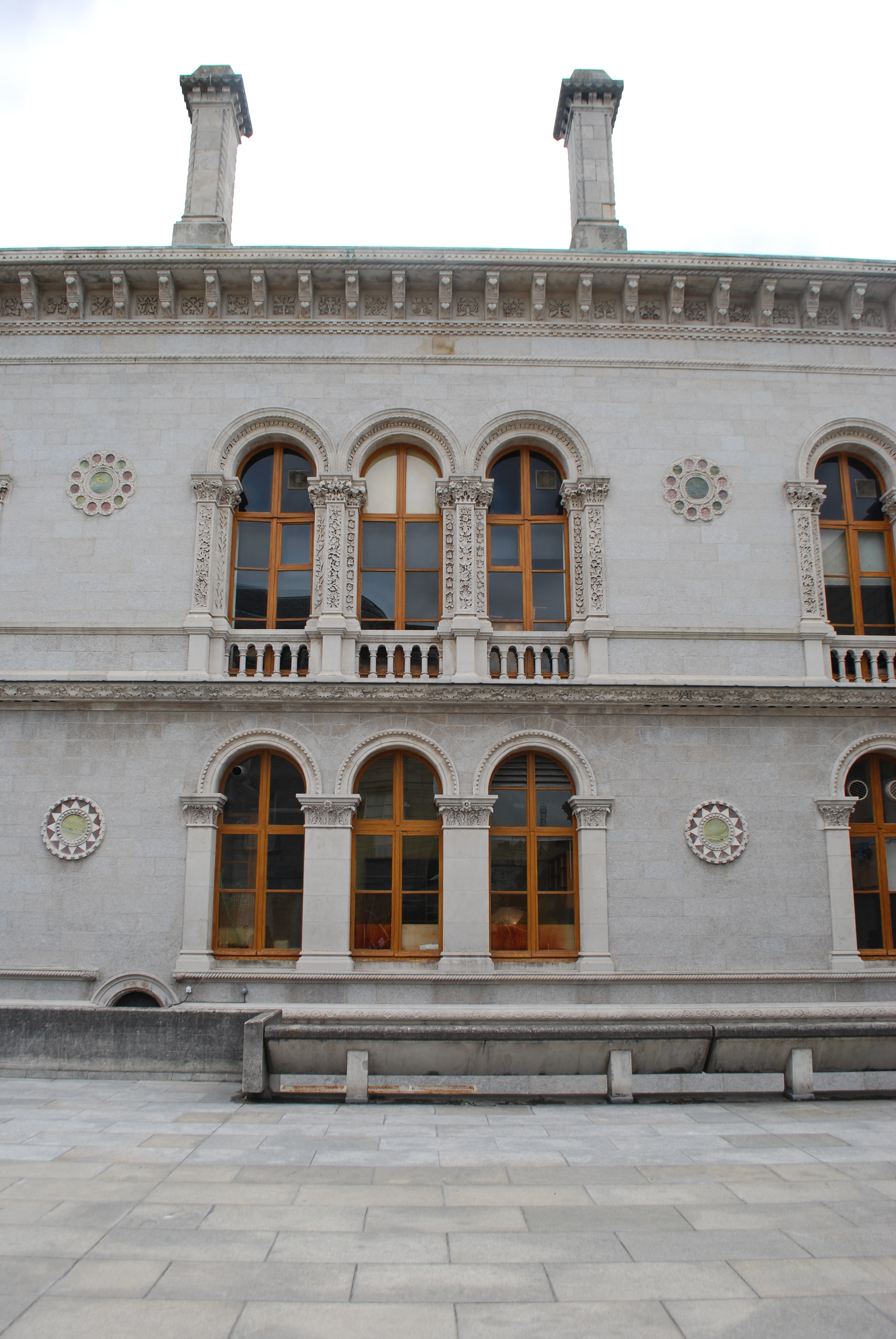
Trinity College, in Dublin.

Modillion double spiral, Neoclassicism (from Classic Art), from keystone of Campanile of Monteforte d'Alpone (Verona ITALY)

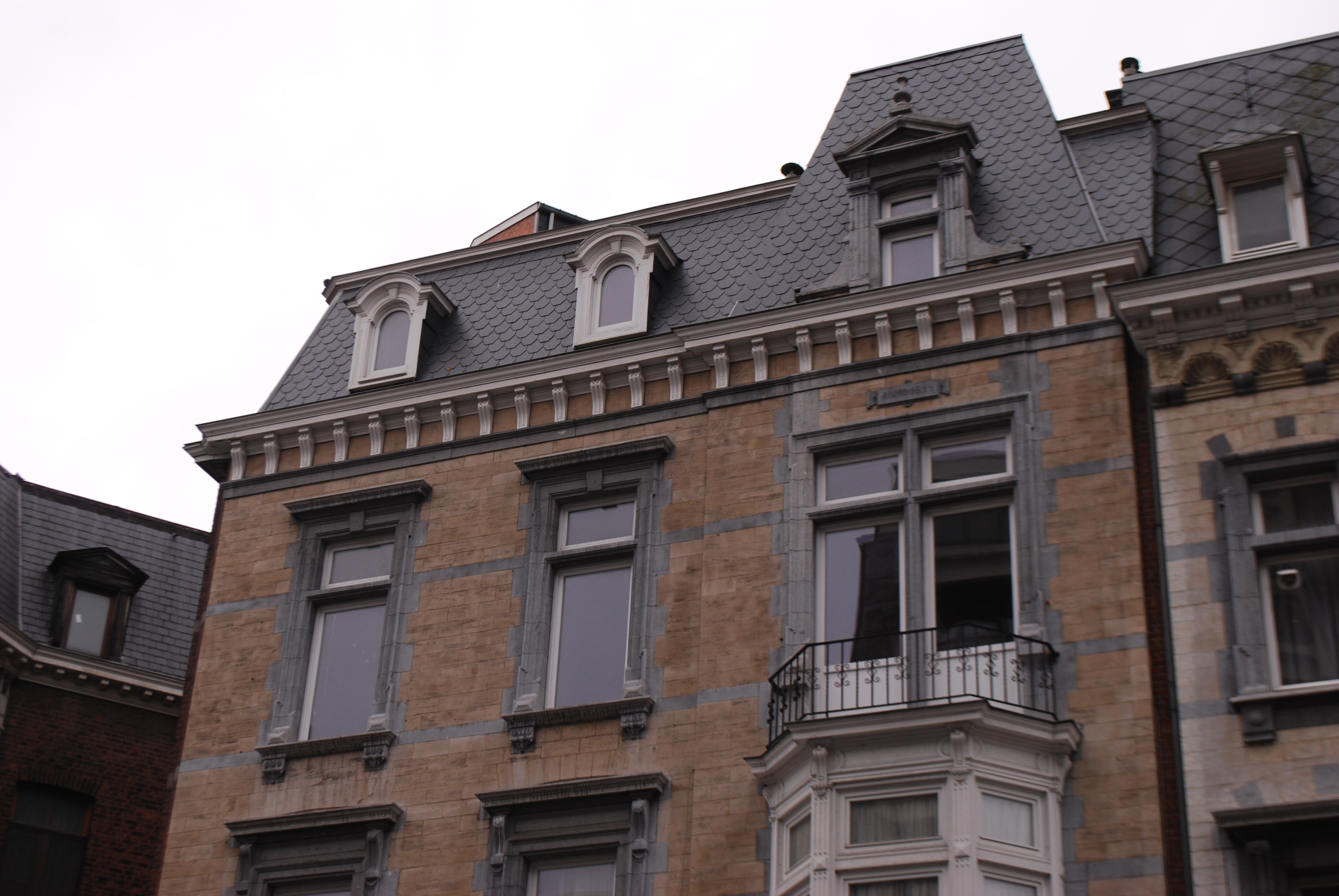
La rue Forgeur, Liège, Belgium.

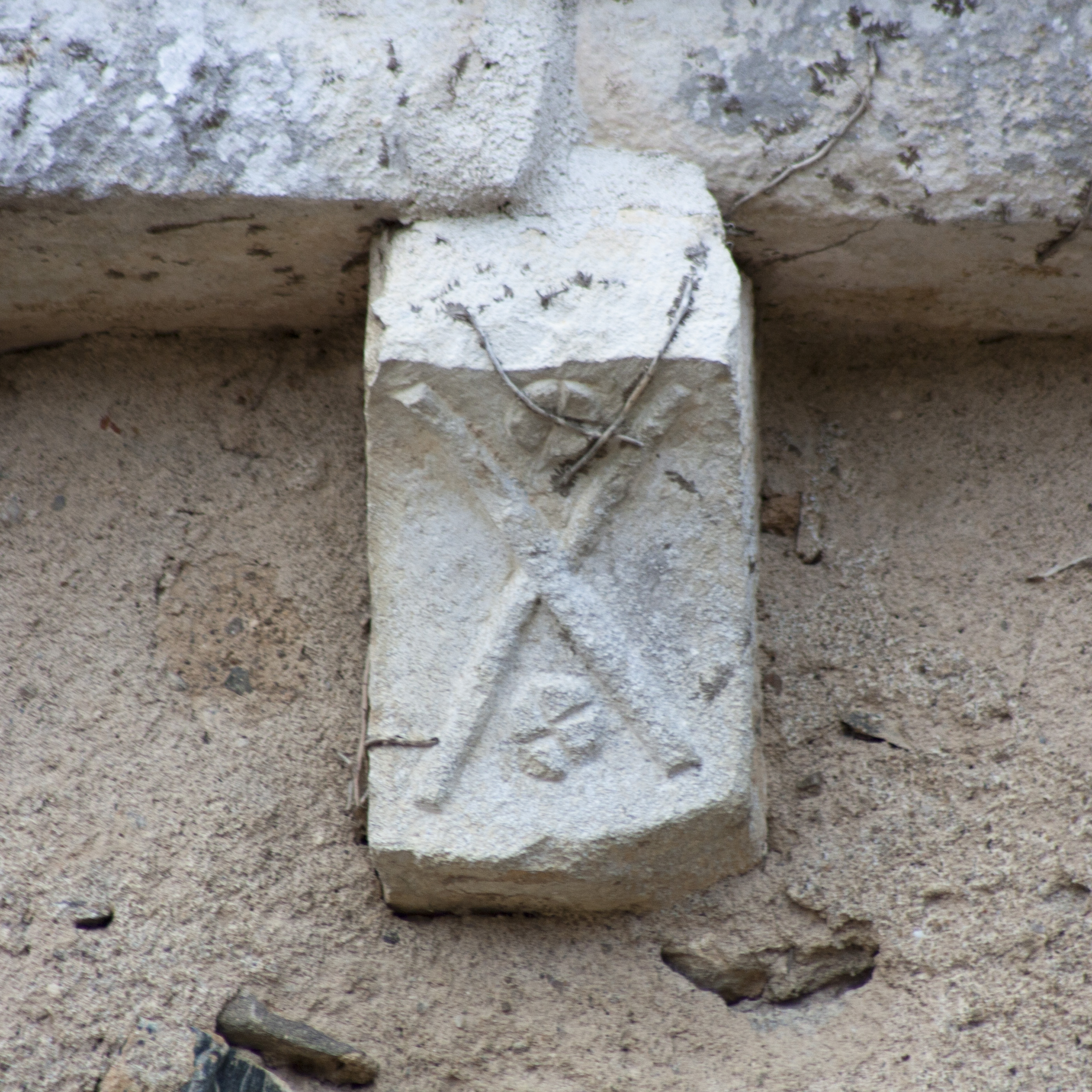
Église de Dampierre, south side of the part of choir from the 13th century.

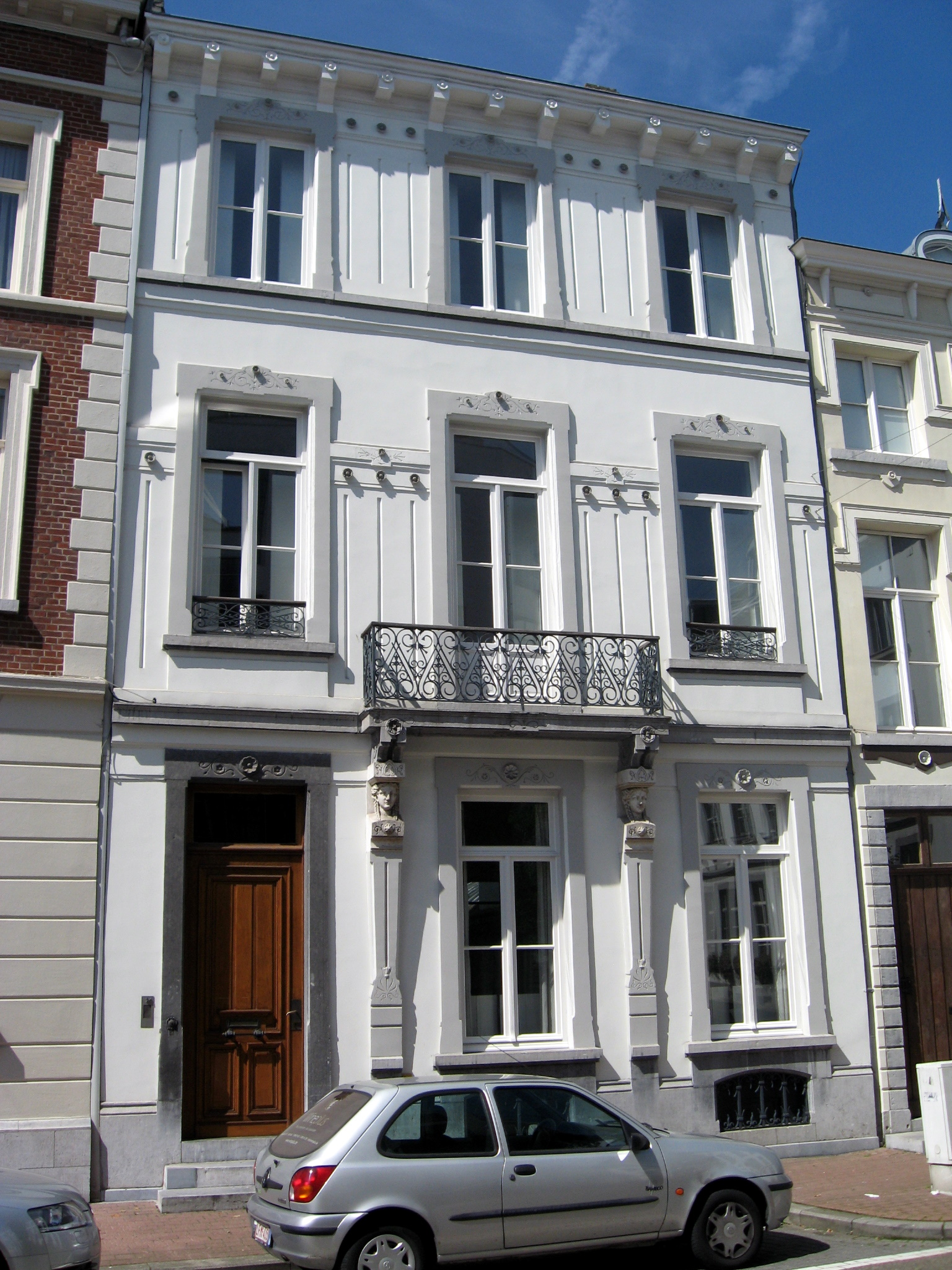
A house in Hasselt, Belgium.
