= James B. Stephens House =

Historic house in Portland, Oregon, U.S.

- U.S. National Register of Historic Places
- Portland Historic Landmark
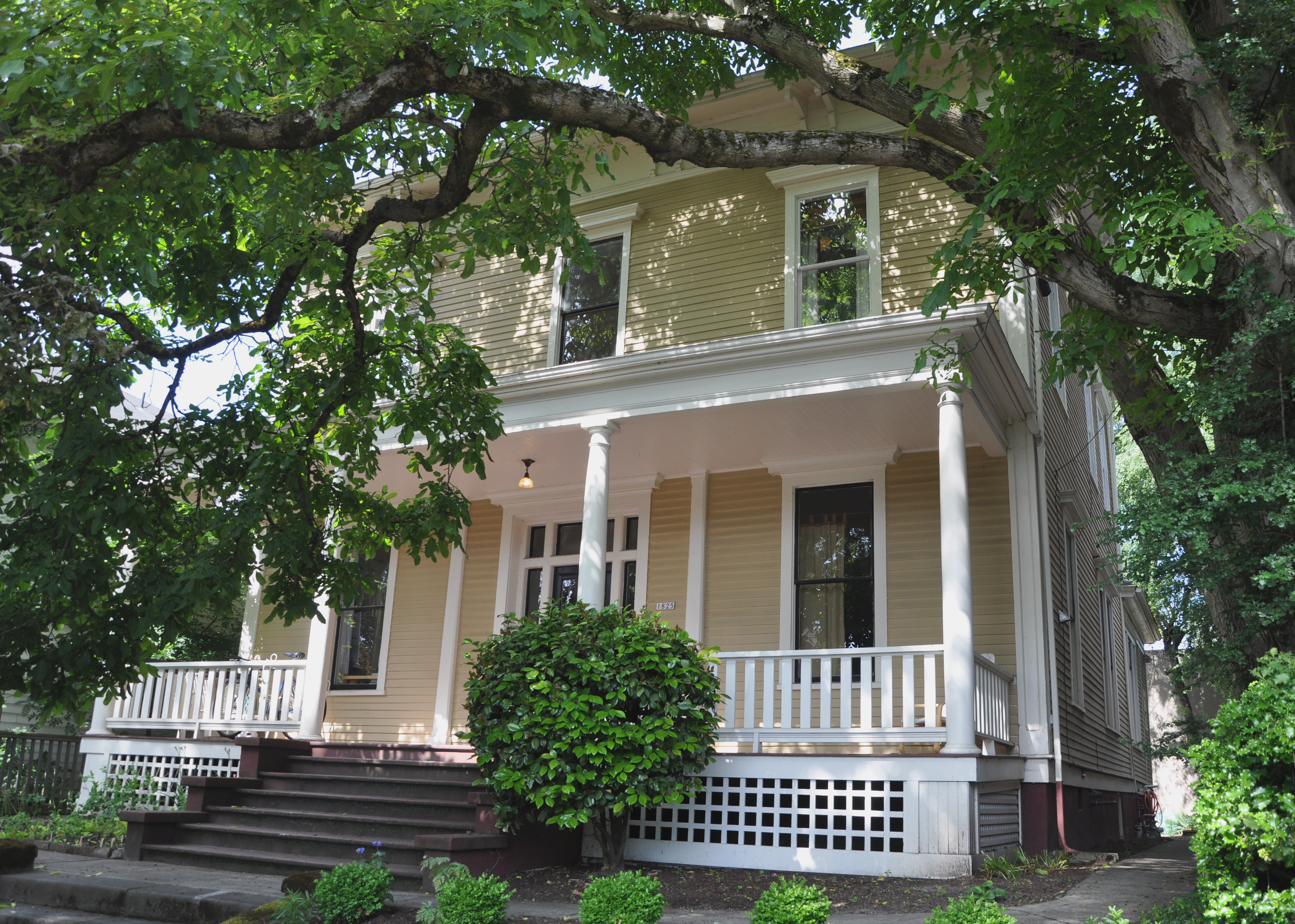
- The Stephens House in 2011
- Location: 1825 SE 12th Avenue; Portland, Oregon
- Coordinates: 45°30′35″N 122°39′14″W
- Area: 0.1 acres (0.040 ha)
- Built: 1862
- Architectural style: Italianate
- NRHP reference No.: 97000134
- Added to NRHP: February 21, 1997

The James B. Stephens House is the oldest house in Portland located in southeast Portland, Oregon, United States. The structure is listed on the National Register of Historic Places. Local journalism indicates it was built in 1862, but Portland Maps indicates it was built in 1868.

== See also ==
- James B. Stephens
- National Register of Historic Places listings in Southeast Portland, Oregon
