= The Barber =

The Barber may refer to:

== Arts and entertainment ==
- The Barber, a 1915 short comedy film starring Ben Turpin
- The Barber (1916 film), a short comedy film
- The Barber (2014 film), a thriller
- "The Barber" (short story), a short story by Flannery O'Connor
- "The Barber" (Seinfeld), an episode of Seinfeld

== People ==
- Ralph Daniello or the Barber (1886–1925), New York mobster, murderer and informant
- John Factor or Jake the Barber (1882–1984), gangster and con artist
- Sal Maglie or the Barber (1917–1992), Major League Baseball pitcher
- Brutus Beefcake or the Barber, American professional wrestler

== See also ==
- The Barber of Bagdad
- The Barber of Birmingham
- The Barber of Seville
- The Barber of Siberia
- Barber (disambiguation)
