= SS James B. Stephens =

World War II Liberty ship of the United States

Coordinates: 28°53′S 33°18′E

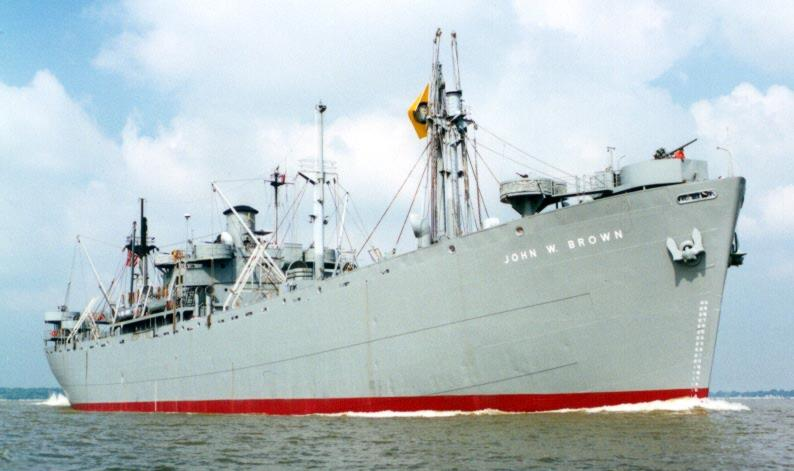
- American Liberty ship SS John W Brown; extensively restored museum ship, identical in original design to SS James B. Stephens

History

United States
- Name: James B. Stephens
- Namesake: James B. Stephens
- Operator: United States Lines, New York City
- Builder: Oregon Shipbuilding Corporation, Portland, Oregon
- Laid down: 11 September 1942
- Launched: 11 October 1942
- Fate: Sunk on 8 March 1943

General characteristics
- Type: Liberty ship
- Tonnage: 7,176 tons
- Length: 422.8 ft (128.9 m)
- Beam: 57 ft (17 m)
- Draught: 8 ft (2.4 m)
- Propulsion: Two oil-fired boilers, triple-expansion steam engine, single screw, 2,500 hp (1,900 kW)
- Speed: 11 to 11.5 knots (20.4 to 21.3 km/h; 12.7 to 13.2 mph)
- Capacity: 9,140 tons cargo
- Crew: 8 officers; 35 crew

SS James B. Stephens was a 7,176-ton American Liberty ship in World War II. She was built by the Oregon Shipbuilding Corporation of Portland, Oregon in 1942 with the hull number 580, and operated by United States Lines, New York City and homeported in Portland. For her role of sailing in dangerous waters, she was armed with one 5in, one 3in and four 20mm guns. She was named for the founder of East Portland.

== Sinking ==
=== Last voyage ===
She spent barely half a year in service, transporting goods for the Allies, from Port Said to the United States, via Suez and Durban. On her last sailing, in early 1943, she was carrying 1086 tons of bottles, medicine, propellers and personal effects. She was at Suez on 18 February, departing there for Durban. At just after 8 o'clock in the evening on 8 March James B. Stephens was travelling unescorted when she was spotted and torpedoed by the German submarine U-160 commanded by Georg Lassen about 150 miles (240 km) northeast of Durban. Her Master, John Edward Green Jr., had been steaming a non-evasive course at a speed of 11.5 knots (21.3 km/h).

=== Torpedoed ===
One torpedo struck on the port side of the James B. Stephens, impacting between the #2 and #3 hatches. The explosion ignited the fuel oil stored in the double bottoms and she began to rapidly sink by the bow. A second torpedo struck her ten minutes later which again hit her on the port side, this time by the #4 hatch, and this time broke the ship in two. Both sections remained afloat, but the ship was ablaze until the following morning. The eight officers, 35 crewmen and 20 members of the US Navy Armed Guards began to abandon ship after the first torpedo hit, striking out from the ship in four lifeboats and three rafts. The explosion of the second torpedo overturned the motor lifeboat and also blew three men from another boat into the water. The other lifeboats were able to pick up all of the men in the water, with the exception of one of the Armed Guards, Vane Irvin Vanderpool, who was not wearing a life jacket and could not swim, and who drowned before he could be rescued. On 11 March, an aircraft spotted one of the boats and directed the ASW naval trawler HMS Norwich City to it. 19 survivors were picked up by the trawler and transported to Durban. 30 survivors were later picked up by the light cruiser HMS Nigeria the next day and taken to Durban. The remaining 13 survivors were rescued six days after the attack by a South African Air Force crash boat one mile (1.6 km) off Durban, after they were spotted by another aircraft.

=== Aftermath ===
An Allied warship sank the stern section of the James B. Stephens with gunfire, and a British warship attempted to take the fore section in tow to Durban, but it sank whilst under tow in heavy seas. Of a total complement of 63, 62 had been rescued and only one was lost. The Boatswain, Edward F. Racine, was later awarded the Distinguished Service Medal for righting the overturned motor lifeboat, rescuing several other men from the water, and then helping to keep morale up whilst awaiting rescue.
