= Cathedral Cliff =

Volcanic rock formation in New Mexico

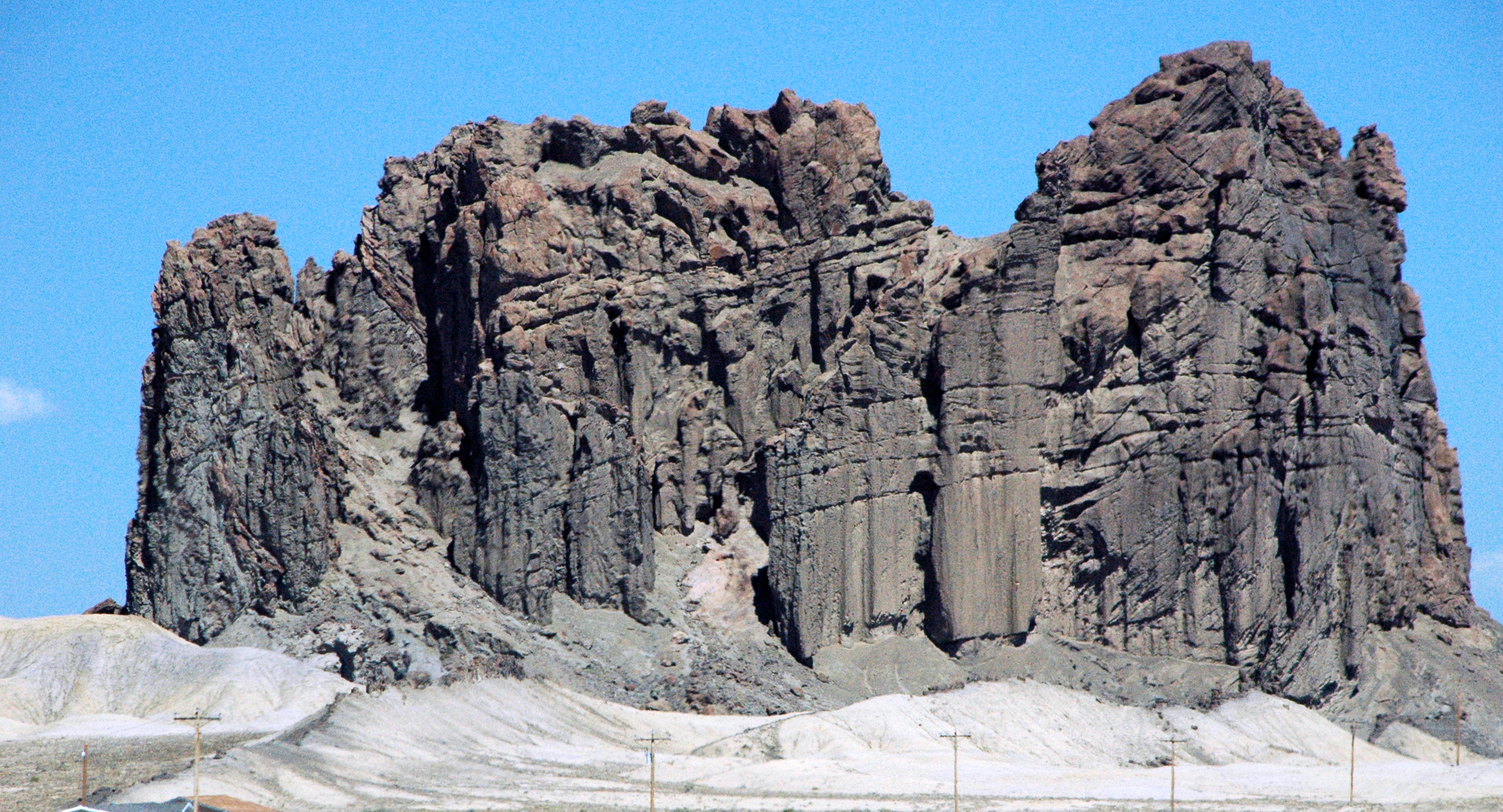
- Southeast aspect

Highest point
- Elevation: 5,810 ft (1,770 m)
- Prominence: 360 ft (110 m)
- Parent peak: Table Mesa ( 5,850 ft)
- Isolation: 1.16 mi (1.87 km)
- Coordinates: 36°36′29″N 108°42′26″W

Geography
- Location within New Mexico Location within the United States
- Location: San Juan County, New Mexico, US
- Parent range: Chuska Mountains; Colorado Plateau
- Topo map: USGS Table Mesa

Geology
- Rock age: Oligocene
- Mountain type: Volcanic plug
- Rock type: Volcanic breccia

Cathedral Cliff is a 5,810-foot (1,770-meter) elevation volcanic plug located on Navajo Nation land in San Juan County of northwest New Mexico, United States. It is a prominent landmark set alongside U.S. Route 491, approximately 13 miles south of the community of Shiprock, New Mexico. Cathedral Cliff is one of the phreatomagmatic diatremes of the Four Corners area, and with significant relief as it rises 400 feet (120 meters) above the high-desert plain. It is situated about 9.5 miles (15.3 km) southeast of Shiprock, the most famous of these diatremes. Cathedral Cliff is set in the northeastern part of the Navajo Volcanic Field, a volcanic field that includes intrusions and flows of minette and other unusual igneous rocks which formed around 30 million years ago during the Oligocene. Its nearest higher neighbor is Table Mesa, one mile to the southwest, and Barber Peak is set 1.5 mile to the southeast.

== Geology ==
Cathedral Cliff is the eroded remnants of a maar-diatreme volcano, formed when rising magma came into contact with country rock saturated with groundwater. The resulting explosive volcanism created a deep volcanic pipe (the diatreme) and a shallow surface crater (the maar). Subsequent erosion has removed 500 to 1,000 meters (1,600 to 3,300 ft) of overlying sediments to expose the deeper diatreme, including the rarely-exposed diatreme-maar transition zone. This has been studied by geologists to gain insights into how maar-diatreme volcanism works. The pipe at this level is a mixture of intact and broken beds of pyroclastic rock deposited at a higher level, which subsequently subsided deeper into the pipe. These were partially destroyed by debris jets later in the eruption.

== Climate ==
According to the Köppen climate classification system, Cathedral Cliff is located in a semi-arid climate zone with cold winters and hot summers. Precipitation runoff from this feature drains into Dead Mans Wash, which is part of the San Juan River drainage basin.

== See also ==
- Rock formations in the United States
