= East Portland, Oregon =

Former city in Oregon later consolidated into Portland

Coordinates: 45.51556°N 122.65917°W

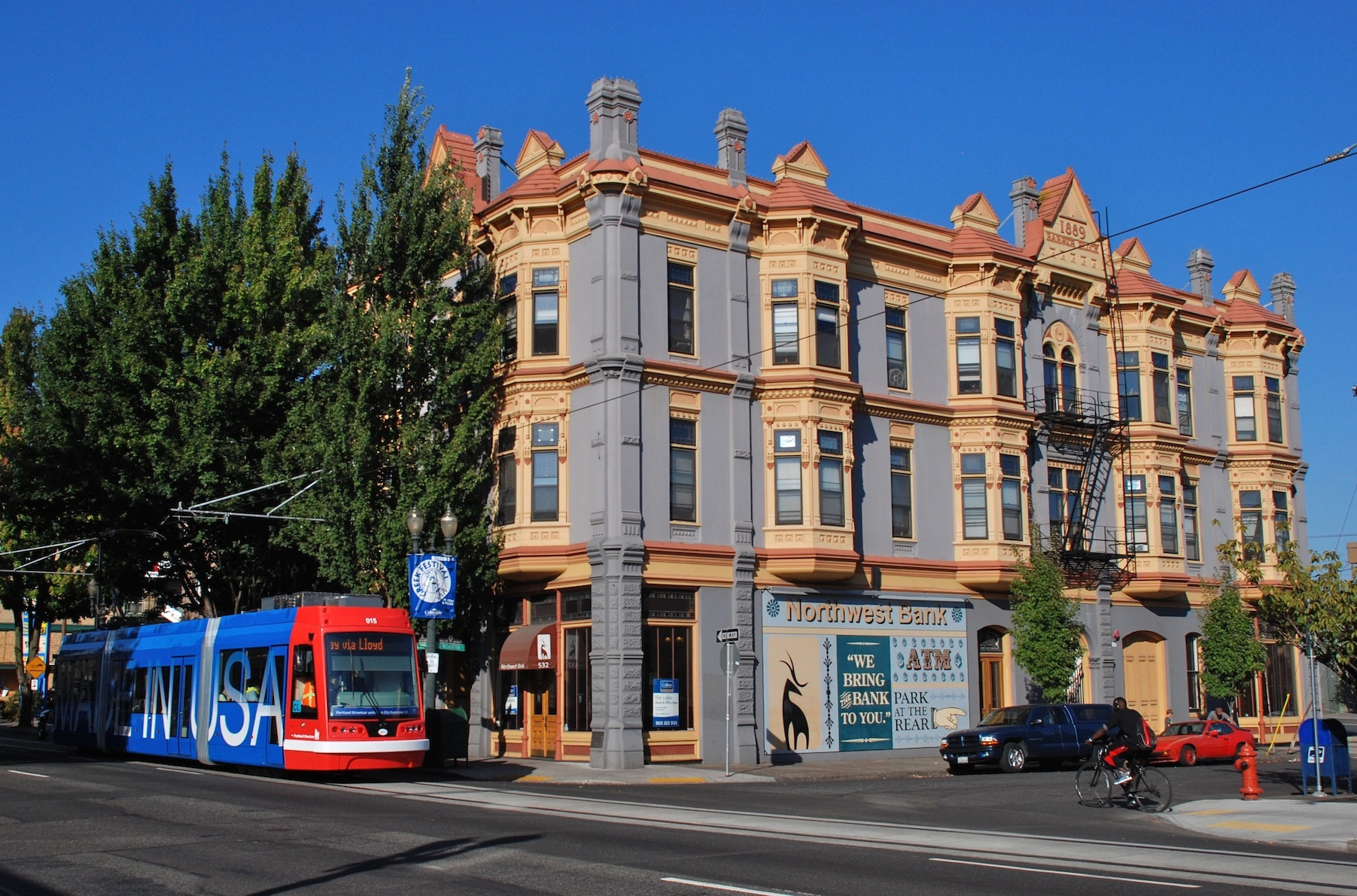
The Barber Block was built in 1889–90 in East Portland.

East Portland was a city in the U.S. state of Oregon that was consolidated into Portland in 1891. In modern usage, the term generally refers to the portion of present-day Portland that lies east of 82nd Avenue, most of which the City of Portland annexed in the 1980s and 1990s.

== The city of the late 19th century ==
The city of East Portland was founded on a 640-acre (260 ha) land claim by James B. Stephens in 1846, who bought the claim from John McLoughlin of the Hudson's Bay Company. The city was incorporated in 1871.

Stephens platted the land from the Willamette River to East First Street, and from today's Glisan Street to present Hawthorne Boulevard. Much of the land east of the river was marshy and crossed by creeks and sloughs, so it was less desirable than Portland riverfront property on the west side of the Willamette River. Development was difficult and expensive since many streets had to be built on trestles.

A few years after Stephens acquired his land, Gideon Tibbetts filed a Donation Land Claim for 640 acres (260 ha) south of what is now Division Street in southeast Portland. Tibbetts founded the first flour mill on the east side of the Willamette, planted extensive orchards, and raised hay on part of his claim. He platted some of this land in the Brooklyn neighborhood, and platted an addition to East Portland. Tibbetts later sold some parcels and his flour mill to Stephens. The value of East Portland waterfront property skyrocketed in 1869, when the East-Side Oregon Central Railroad connecting East Portland and Salem was completed. Railroad magnate Ben Holladay established ferry service across the Willamette to Portland from the northern terminus of the railroad about that time; the boat was superseded in 1880 by the Oregon & California Railroad Ferry No. 2, put into service by Henry Villard, and later by the Steel and Morrison bridges.

On July 6, 1891, the cities of East Portland, Albina and Portland merged as the city of Portland, Oregon. At the time, the population of East Portland was estimated to be 11,457. In about the same year, Ladd's Addition, which lay between the Stephens and Tibbetts land claims, was converted from farm land to a residential neighborhood.

== The modern district in the eastern part of Portland ==
The term East Portland is now widely used to refer to the portion of the city east of 82nd Avenue, where approximately 28% of Portland's population resides. Much of Portland's black and minority population have moved east of 82nd Avenue, as of 2011, in a trend that was expected to continue.

In March 2015, a group called East Portland de-Annexation Secession filed a measure with the City of Portland, and are petitioning to secede from Portland. However, Deborah Scroggin, Portland's election officer, rejected the petition because it did not meet requirements of Section 1 (2) (d) and (5) Article IV of the Oregon Constitution. Collene Swenson, a resident of East Portland, said that she will draft the new initiative, with the help of lawyers.

== See also ==
- East Portland Grand Avenue Historic District
- History of Portland, Oregon
- History of Oregon
