= Henry Gray Barbour =

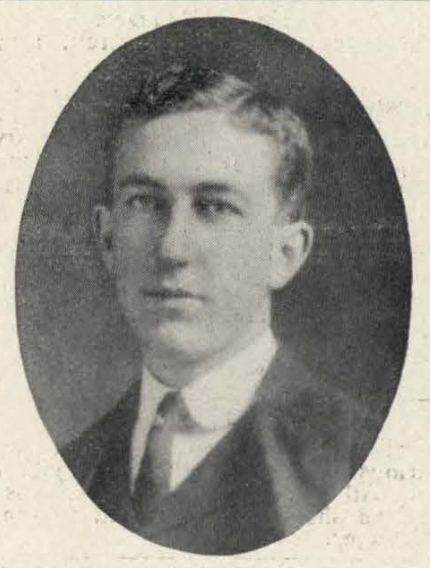
Barbour at Trinity College, 1906

Henry Gray Barbour (28 March 1886 – 23 September 1943) was an American physiologist and pharmacologist who served as a professor of pharmacology and toxicology at Yale University. He studied water exchange and metabolism associated with thermal control. He devised a standard technique for measuring the specific gravity of blood plasma. He found that heavy water decelerated metabolic activities in animals.

== Biography ==
Barbour was born in Hartford, Connecticut, to Reverend John Barbour, professor of theology and his wife Annie Gray. He went to Hartford Public High School before receiving an A.B. from Trinity College (1906) and a medical degree from Johns Hopkins University (1910).

He married Lilla, daughter of nutrition specialist Professor Russell H. Chittenden in 1906. Barbour worked as a pathology fellow before studying in Freiburg in 1911 and then at Vienna with Hans Horst Meyer. He returned to the US and joined Yale University in 1912. He moved to McGill University in 1921 and then moved to the University of Louisville in 1923.

He helped the US war effort with studies on poison gases in association with the US Bureau of Mines. He authored a book, "Experimental Pharmacology and Toxicology" (1932). Barbour studied temperature maintenance and water balance. Another of his experimental findings was on the effect of heavy water on animal metabolism, which he found that replacing more than a fifth of the body water resulted in a reduction in metabolic activity.
