= East Portland Grand Avenue Historic District =

Historic district in Portland, Oregon, U.S.

- U.S. National Register of Historic Places
- U.S. Historic district
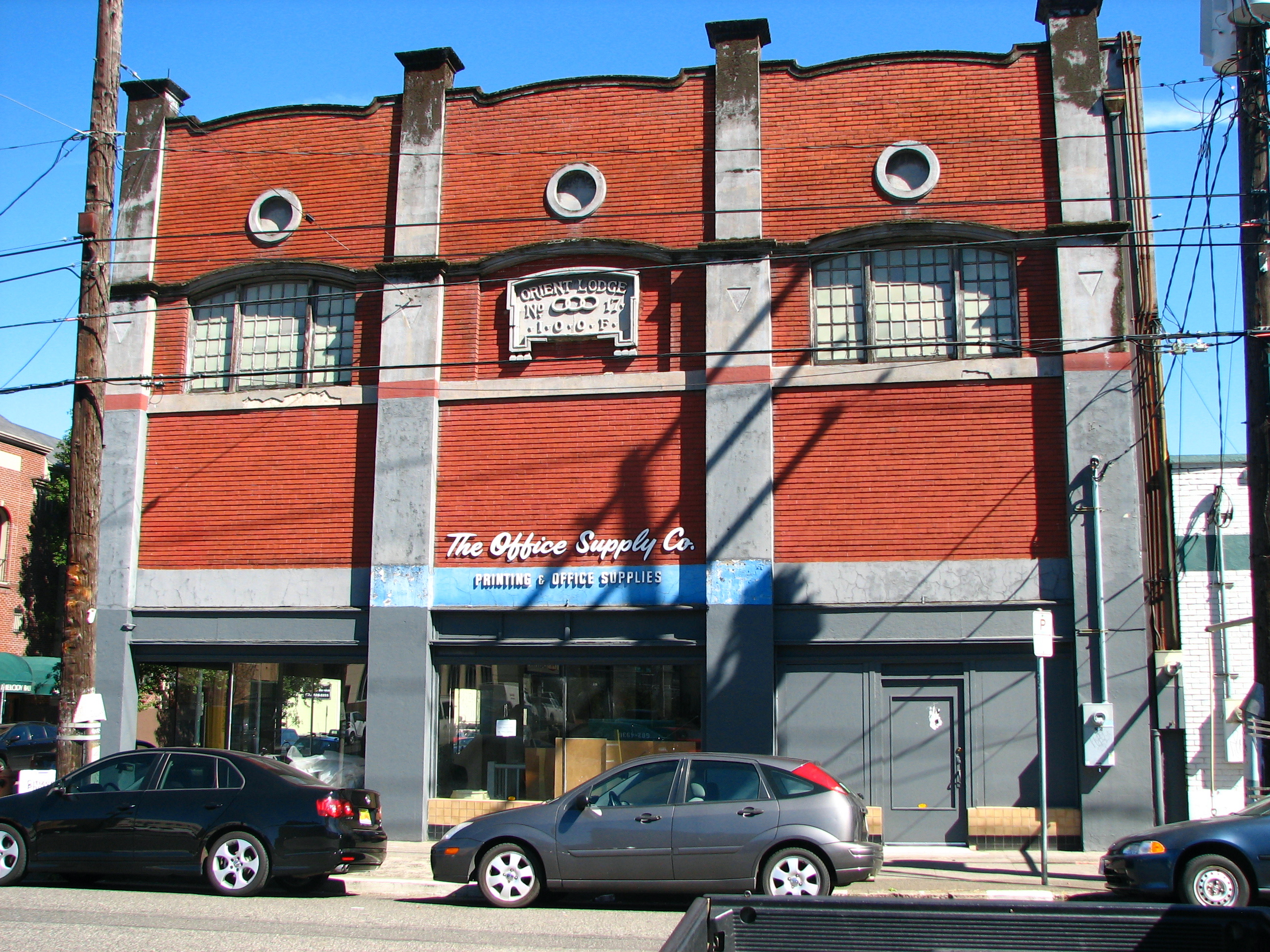
- The Orient Lodge, a contributing resource in the East Portland Grand Avenue Historic District, in 2009

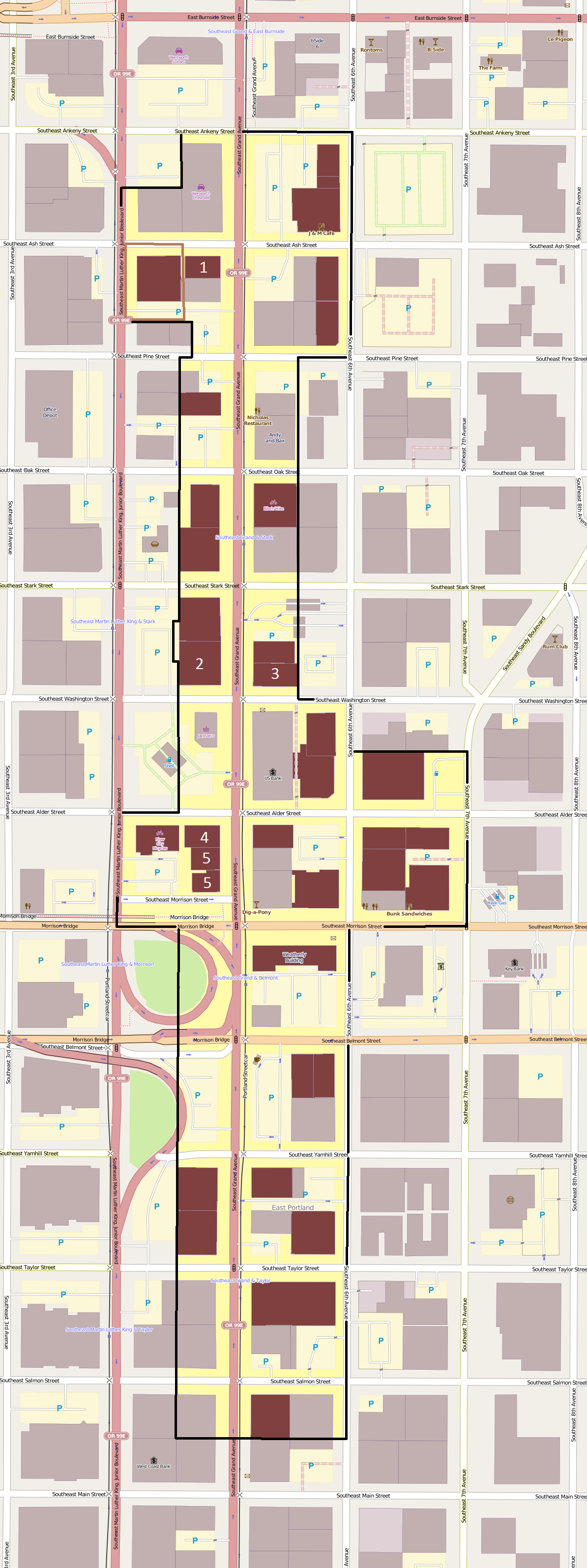
- Location of the historic district in Portland
- Location: Bounded by Main and Ankeny Sts, SE 7th Ave and SE Martin Luther King, Jr. Blvd (SE Union Ave), Portland, Oregon
- Coordinates: 45°31′04″N 122°39′39″W
- Area: 28 acres (11 ha)
- Architectural style: Colonial Revival, Art Deco, Italianate
- NRHP reference No.: 91000126 (original); 13001066 (increase)

Significant dates
- Added to NRHP: March 4, 1991
- Boundary increase: December 5, 2013

The East Portland Grand Avenue Historic District, located in southeast Portland, Oregon, is listed on the National Register of Historic Places. The district includes approximately 20 city blocks on or near Southeast Grand Avenue on the east side of the Willamette River, roughly bounded on the south by SE Main Street, north by SE Ankeny Street, west by SE Martin Luther King Jr. Boulevard, and east by SE Seventh Avenue. Most structures in the district are commercial buildings rising two to three stories. Immediately to the west of the historic district is Portland's east side industrial area, and to the east are industrial and residential areas.

== History ==
The historic district is part of a larger area originally designated in 1850 as the East Portland Townsite. In 1861 James B. Stephens platted the area into 200-foot by 200-foot blocks from a portion of his donation land claim. The townsite was roughly bounded by the Willamette River to the west, 12th Street to the east, Glisan Street to the north, and Hawthorne Street to the south.

By 1870, the Oregon Central Railroad included a branch through East Portland, and the community was incorporated in 1871. Commercial development increased, and in 1891 East Portland was annexed into the city of Portland.

== Designation of buildings ==
The historic period of significance for the district is 1883 through 1930. Buildings designated as "primary" contributing properties were constructed between 1883 and 1915. Those designated as "secondary" were constructed between 1916 and 1930.

A third designation, "historic but non-contributing," denotes buildings constructed within the period of significance but which have been modernized or altered beyond their historic identity.

The East Portland Grand Avenue Historic District includes a total of 74 properties, and 50 are designated either primary, secondary, or historic non-contributing.

A fourth designation, "non-contributing," denotes buildings constructed after 1930. The district contains six non-contributing buildings and 18 vacant lots.

== See also ==
- History of Portland, Oregon
- National Register of Historic Places listings in Southeast Portland, Oregon
