= Barber Peak =

Volcanic plug on Navajo Nation land in New Mexico

- Tsé Naajin
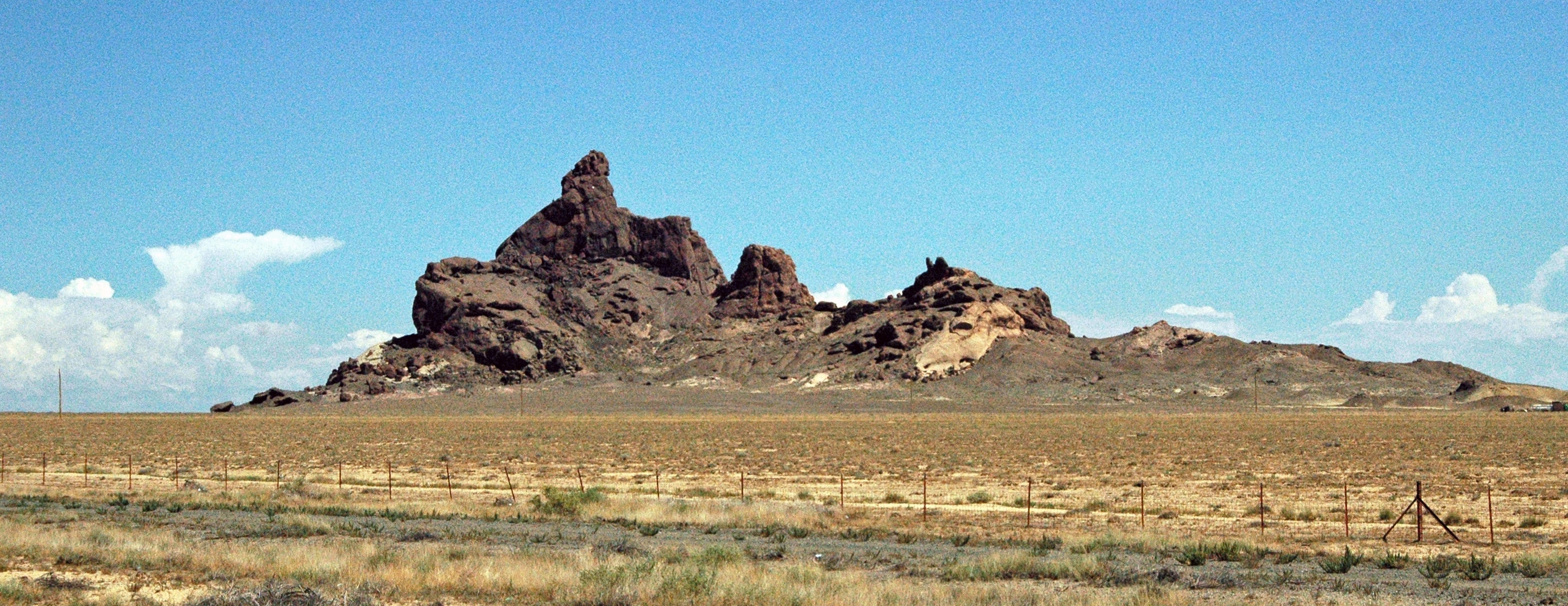
- West aspect

Highest point
- Elevation: 5,778 ft (1,761 m)
- Prominence: 308 ft (94 m)
- Parent peak: Table Mesa (5,850 ft)
- Isolation: 1.47 mi (2.37 km)
- Coordinates: 36°35′14″N 108°41′47″W

Geography
- Location within New Mexico Location within the United States
- Location: San Juan County, New Mexico, US
- Parent range: Chuska Mountains; Colorado Plateau
- Topo map: USGS Table Mesa

Geology
- Rock age: Oligocene
- Mountain type: Volcanic plug
- Rock type: Volcanic breccia

Climbing
- First ascent: 1981 by M. Dalen, D. Nordstrom
- Easiest route: Southeast gully, class 5.8+

Barber Peak is a 5,778-foot (1,761-meter) elevation volcanic plug located on Navajo Nation land in San Juan County of northwest New Mexico, United States. It is a prominent landmark set one-half mile east of U.S. Route 491, approximately 15 miles south of the community of Shiprock, New Mexico. Its nearest higher neighbor is Table Mesa, one mile to the west, and Cathedral Cliff is set 1.5 mile to the northwest. Barber Peak is one of the phreatomagmatic diatremes of the Four Corners area, and with significant relief as it rises 300 feet (91 meters) above the high-desert plain. It is situated about 11 miles (18 km) southeast of Shiprock, the most famous of these diatremes. Barber Peak is set in the northeastern part of the Navajo Volcanic Field, a volcanic field that includes intrusions and flows of minette and other unusual igneous rocks which formed around 30 million years ago during the Oligocene. In the Navajo language, this geographical feature is called Tsé Naajin, meaning "black downward rock."

== Climate ==
According to the Köppen climate classification system, Barber Peak is located in a semi-arid climate zone with cold winters and hot summers. Precipitation runoff from this feature drains into the San Juan River drainage basin.

== See also ==
- Rock formations in the United States
