= Barber Dam =

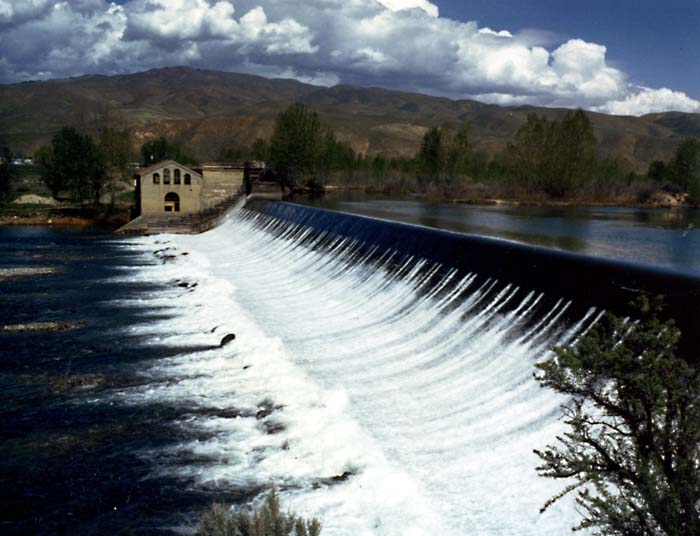
- The dam in 1979

- Location in the United States Location in Idaho
- Country: United States
- Location: Ada County, Idaho
- Coordinates: 43°33′37″N 116°07′18″W
- Status: Operational
- Construction began: 1904
- Opening date: 1906; 120 years ago
- Owner: Ada County

Dam and spillways
- Height: 30 feet (9 m)
- Length: 400 feet (122 m)

Reservoir
- Active capacity: 180 acre-feet (222,027 m^{3})
- Normal elevation: 2,765 feet (843 m)

Power Station
- Type: Run-of-the-river
- Hydraulic head: 25 feet (7.6 m)
- Turbines: 2 x Kaplan-type
- Installed capacity: 4.14 MW
- Barber Dam and Lumber Mill
- U.S. National Register of Historic Places
- Nearest city: Boise, Idaho
- Built: 1906
- Architectural style: A.J. Wiley
- NRHP reference No.: 78001037
- Added to NRHP: November 21, 1978

The Barber Dam is a timber-crib dam in the western United States, on the Boise River in southwestern Idaho. Located in Ada County, about three miles (5 km) east of Boise, the dam was constructed by the Barber Lumber Company between 1904 and 1906 to serve as a mill pond for timber. A power plant was also constructed in conjunction with the dam which powered the mill and the town of Barberton (Barber), which was established in 1910.

In 1934, the Great Depression effected the closure of the mill and the facilities were purchased by Boise Cascade. The Harris Ranch purchased the dam and mill after the depression and developed the area for residential property. The dam was purchased by Ada County in 1977 and is currently regulated by the Idaho Department of Water Resources.

The run-of-the-river dam's power house contains two Kaplan turbine generators with a combined capacity of 4.14 MW and is operated by Enel Green Power. The dam and lumber mill were added to the National Register of Historic Places on November 21, 1978.
