= Edward Barbour =

American politician and lawyer

Edward A. Barbour Jr. was an American Democratic politician and lawyer who served in the Missouri General Assembly. He served in the Missouri Senate from 1935 until 1943 and in the Missouri House of Representatives from 1923 until 1925.

Barbour was educated at public schools of Springfield, Missouri, Drury College, University of Missouri, and the School of Law at Washington University in St. Louis. During World War I, he served at the Adjutant General Department of Camp McArthur at Waco, Texas.
