= Barber Block =

Historic building in Portland, Oregon, U.S.

- U.S. National Register of Historic Places
- U.S. Historic district – Contributing property
- Portland Historic Landmark
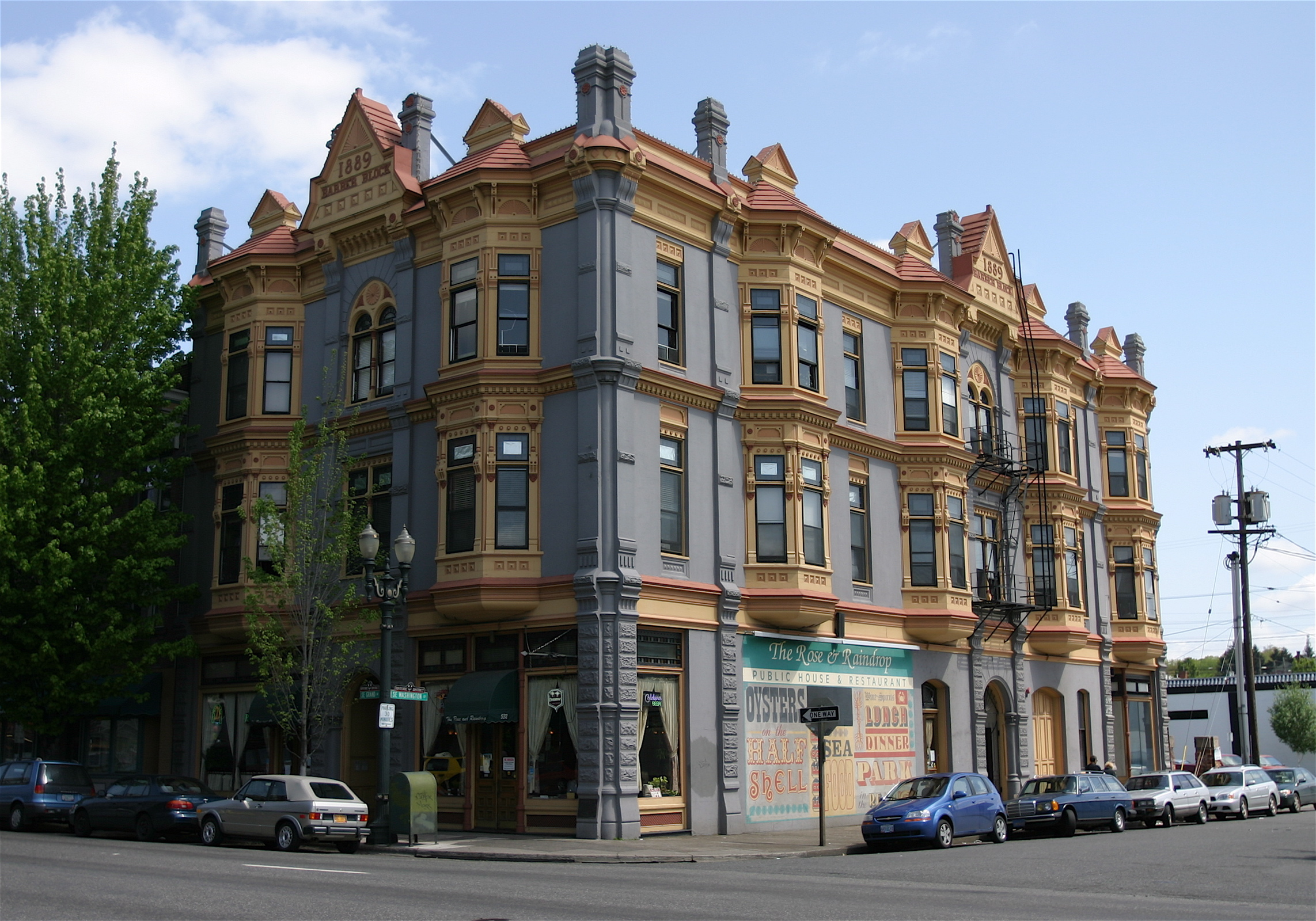
- The Barber Block in 2006
- Location: 532–538 SE Grand Avenue; Portland, Oregon
- Coordinates: 45°31′08″N 122°39′37″W
- Built: 1890
- Architect: Thomas J. Jones
- Architectural style: Mixed late Victorian styles, including Italianate, Queen Anne, Richardsonian Romanesque, others
- Part of: East Portland Grand Avenue Historic District (ID91000126)
- NRHP reference No.: 77001109
- Added to NRHP: February 15, 1977

The Barber Block is a building complex located at the corner of Southeast Grand and Washington Streets in Portland, Oregon, listed on the National Register of Historic Places (NRHP). It was built in 1890 and listed on the NRHP in 1977. It is also located within the East Portland Grand Avenue Historic District.

Among the building's occupants in the 1920s was a nickelodeon theater. After the Columbus Day Storm of 1962 caused significant damage to the building's roof, its owners considering demolishing it, but decided against doing so. The ground floor spaces have been used by various types of businesses over the decades, including a furniture store, a restaurant and a bank, while the second and third floors have always been residential, mostly as apartments but for a time as a single-room occupancy residential hotel.

The building underwent a renovation in the late 1970s and another in the 2000s.

== See also ==
- National Register of Historic Places listings in Southeast Portland, Oregon
