= Barber Cup and Crawford Cup =

Ancient Roman cups

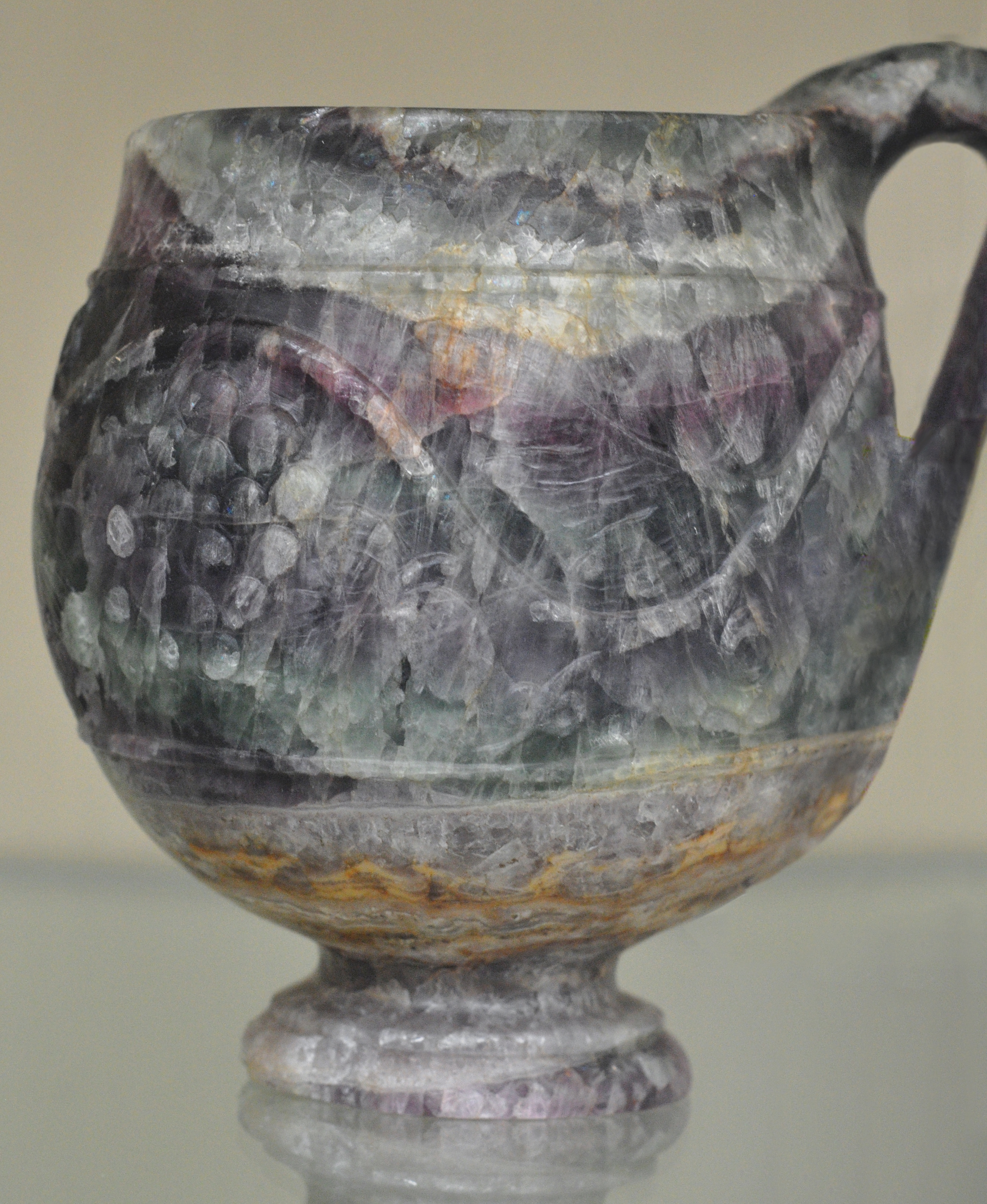
The Barber Cup

The Barber Cup and Crawford Cup are two non-matching carved fluorite cups from about 50–100 AD. They were discovered during World War I by an Austro-Croatian officer who excavated a Roman tomb near the current Turkish–Syrian border. Both cups are now in the collection of the British Museum, which acquired the Crawford Cup in 1971 and the Barber Cup in 2004. The two cups are the only two vessels carved from fluorite (also known as fluorspar) that are known to have survived intact from the Roman period.

== Murrine vessels ==
Hardstone carvings were highly valued luxury items in the Roman Empire. Pliny the Elder wrote about exorbitant amounts of money spent for cups made of "murrine" (almost certainly fluorite). Cups made from the stone gave a strange, pleasing taste to wine drunk from them. This was probably from residual resin (perhaps myrrh) that was applied to the stones, while they were carved, to prevent shattering. Pliny described the softness of the material (one Roman counsel nibbled at the edges of his cup) as well as its many-colored, banded appearance. The source of murrine was Persia.

== Discovery and provenance ==
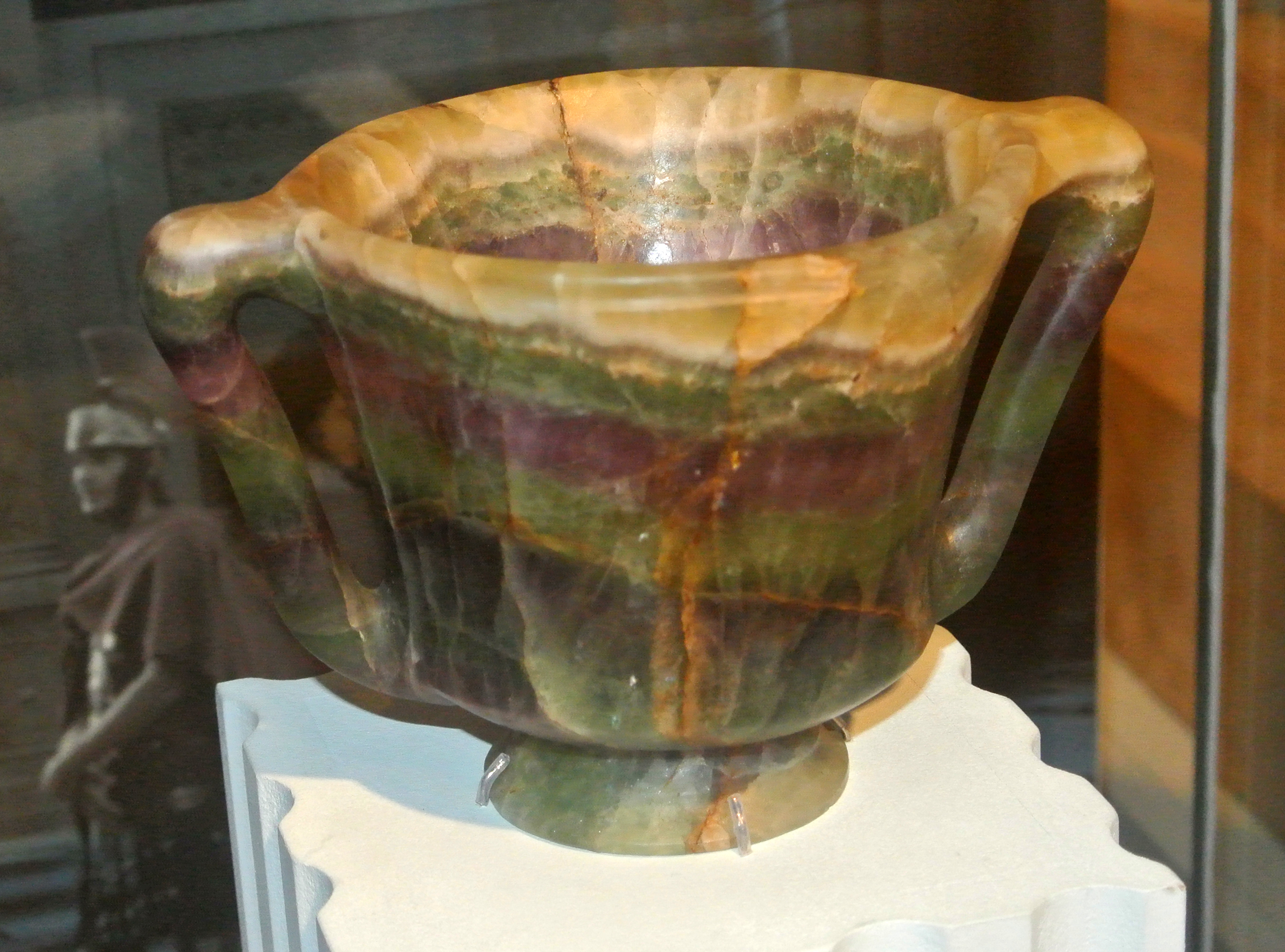
The Crawford Cup

The two cups were discovered with other items in a Roman tomb near the modern border between Turkey and Syria by an Austro-Croatian officer during World War I. Inside the tomb was a lead casket containing some gold medallions and the two fluorite vessels. All the items were dispersed shortly after World War I.

It is unclear who originally purchased the two-handled cup, but by 1949 it was in the possession of A.I. Loewental. The Art Fund acquired this vessel for the British Museum in 1971 at a cost of £2,300, and named it the Crawford Cup after David Lindsay, 28th Earl of Crawford, a trustee of the museum. The Crawford Cup is a two-handled goblet or kantharos, whose Roman origin is reinforced by its close similarity in design with the Cup of the Ptolemies, an agate kantharos now in Paris. It measures 9.7 cm high by 10.7 cm in diameter. It is 14.9 cm wide (including the handles) and weighs 867 g.

The one-handled cup was acquired by the Belgian collector Baron Adolphe Stoclet in Paris during the 1920s. In 2004, The Art Fund and other donors acquired this cup for British Museum via the antiquities dealer Charles Ede for £150,000, and named it the Barber Cup after the former chairman of the British Museum Friends, Nicholas Barber. The Barber Cup has a low-relief design of a vine and grapes, and may have been intended as a trulla, or dipper. It measures 15 cm high (13.5 cm without the handle) by 9.5 cm wide (at the rim). The foot is 6.4 cm in diameter.

== See also ==
- Murrine
