= James B. Stephens =

American businessman (1806–1889)

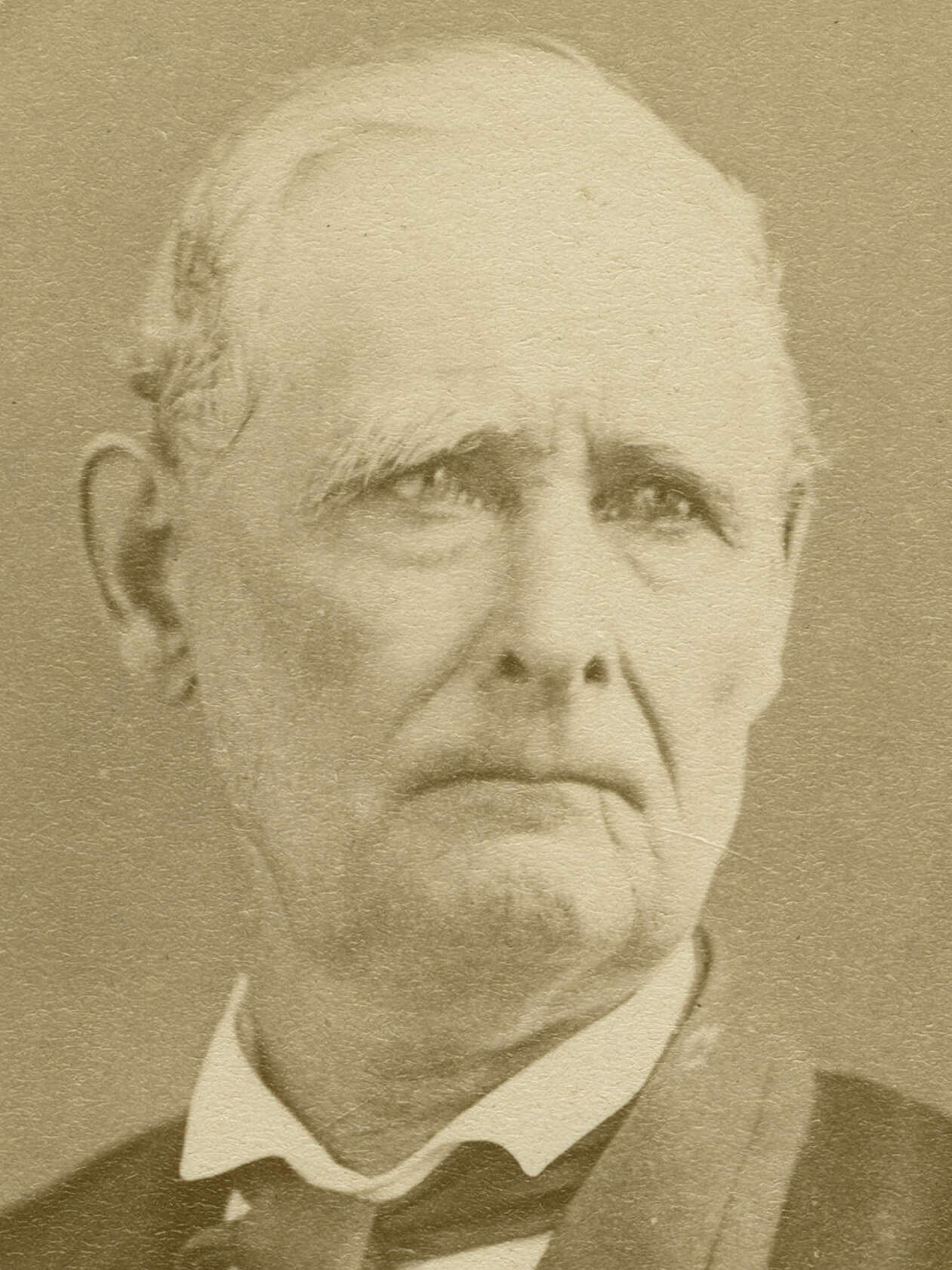
- Born: November 19, 1806; Brooke County, Virginia
- Died: March 22, 1889 (aged 82); Portland, Oregon
- Occupation: Businessman
- Spouse: Elizabeth Walker

James B. Stephens (November 9, 1806 – March 22, 1889) was a pioneer of the U.S. state of Oregon. A cooper by trade, he operated one of the first ferries across the Willamette River at what was East Portland, Oregon. His father was the first burial at Portland's Lone Fir Cemetery. A native of Virginia, he was the founder of East Portland and Stephens Street in Portland, Oregon is named in his honor.

== Early life ==
James Stephens was born on November 19, 1806, in Brooke County, Virginia (later West Virginia) to Emmor Stephens. When he was eight, his family moved to a farm in the Indiana Territory. He learned the cooper trade, and practiced for several years in Indiana and in Cincinnati, Ohio. James married Elizabeth Walker in 1830 while living in Kentucky. They would have seven children, of whom they would outlive all but one. He established a farm and a grocery store before moving to the Oregon Country in 1844, where he settled near what is now Portland, Oregon.

== Oregon ==
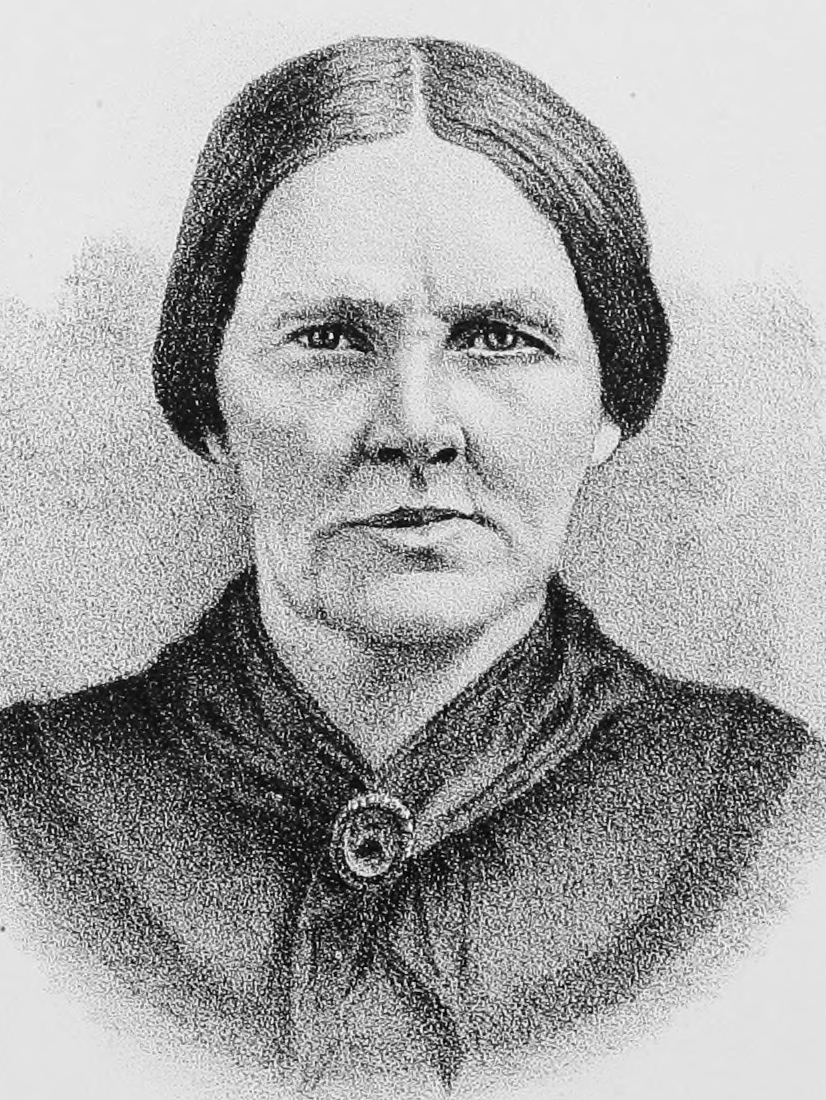
Elizabeth Stephens from Elwood Evans history (1889).

He started a cooper shop in Oregon City and got his barrel-making stock from William Overton, one of the founders of Portland.

Stephens refused Overton's offer to sell him his Portland land claim for 300 new salmon barrels because he planned to bid for another claim, which he secured in 1845 and on which East Portland was founded. East Portland was also known as Stephens' Addition. In 1846 he made 1000 flour barrels and 400 salmon barrels for the Hudson's Bay Company, and in 1847 he made 400 beef barrels for shipment to the Sandwich Islands.

In East Portland he operated the first ferry, located near the present location of the Morrison Bridge. It began operations in 1846, and was the first ferry in what became Multnomah County (it was part of Twality District at that time). During the California Gold Rush, Stephens sold his land and headed south to the gold fields.

He returned in 1850 and purchased land in what is now Southeast Portland from John McLoughlin. Stephens laid out the town from the Willamette River to East First Street, and from Glisan Street to Hawthorne Street. Dividing his land into town lots, which he offered to settlers on their own terms, Stephens was said to materially aiding the development of the east side of the river. The Stark Street Ferry across the Willamette River began operating in 1853. In 1855, he helped organize the Pacific Telegraph Company.

Stephens expanded East Portland in 1861 and opened the East Portland Savings and Loan Bank. In 1862, he donated the land for the construction of the Oregon Hospital for the Insane in East Portland. The bank, which was at First and Oak streets, closed in 1873. Stephens operated a ferry across the Willamette River at Oregon City for 17 years.

=== Cemetery ===
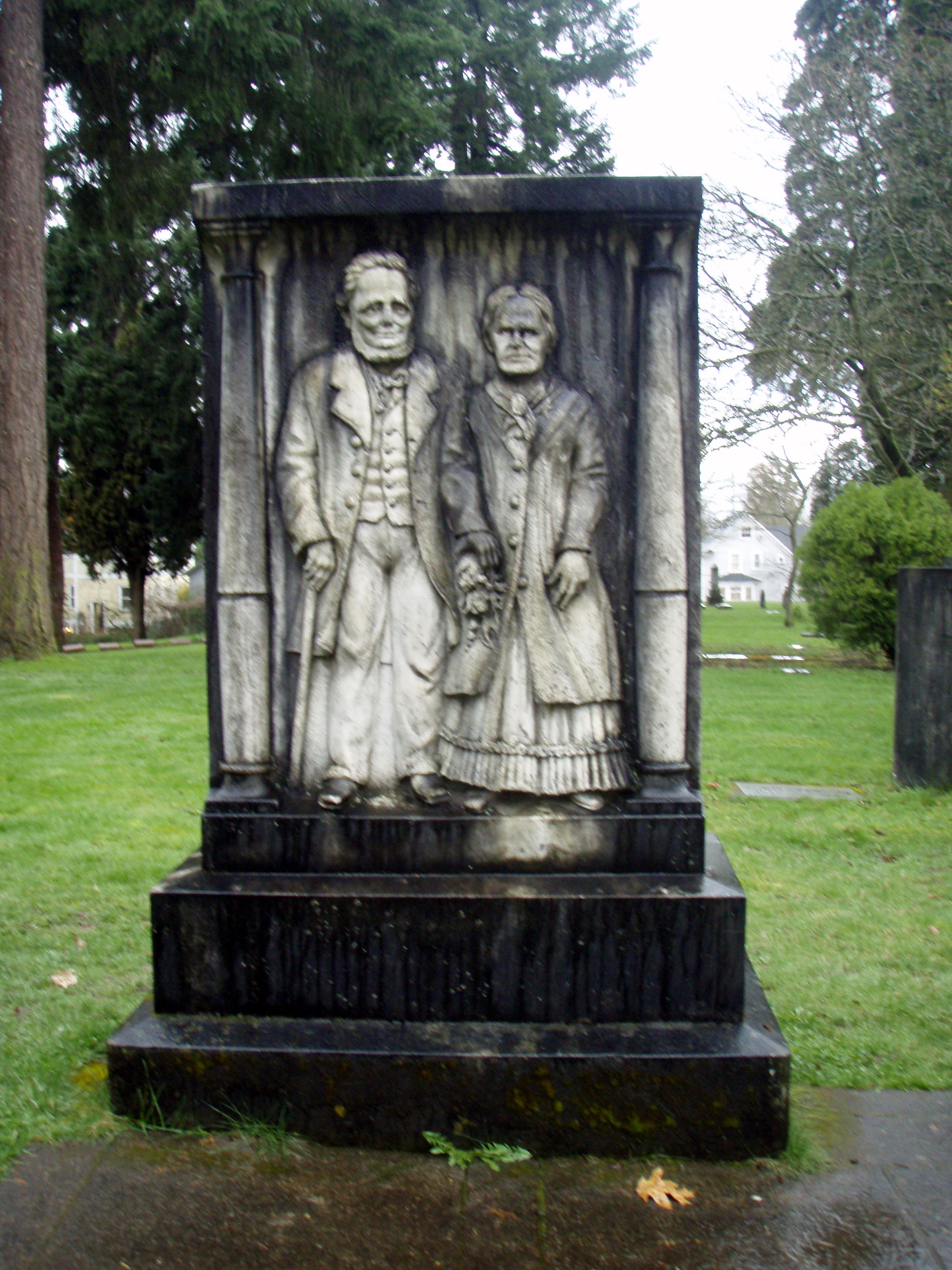
Gravestone of James and Elizabeth Stephens

James’ father Emmor died in 1846 and was buried on the family land in East Portland. When Stephens sold the land to Colburn Barrell in 1854, he required Barrell to maintain the grave site. On April 8, 1854, Barrell's ship Gazelle exploded and killed his partner and several others, all buried next to Emmor Stephens. Barrell then created Mt. Crawford Cemetery on 10 acres (40,000 m^{2}), which became Lone Fir Cemetery after 1866 when 20 acres (81,000 m^{2}) more had been added to the grounds of the cemetery. Stephens and his wife Elizabeth are buried at the cemetery.

== Legacy ==
James B. Stephens died on March 22, 1889, at the age of 82. The liberty ship SS James B. Stephens was named for him. The National Register of Historic Places-listed James B. Stephens House is one of the oldest houses in Portland. Stephens Street in Portland is named for him.
