= Philip Lemont Barbour =

American historian

- Born: December 21, 1898; Louisville, Kentucky, U.S.
- Died: December 21, 1980 (aged 82); Petersburg, Virginia, U.S.
- Resting place: Mapleshade Cemetery, Ridgefield, Connecticut
- Occupations: Historian; linguist; radio broadcaster
- Spouse: Consuelo Seggerman (m. 1926; div. 1929)
- Writing career
- Notable works: The Three Worlds of Captain John Smith; The Jamestown Voyages under the First Charter, 1606-1609; The complete works of Captain John Smith (1580-1631)

Philip Lemont Barbour (December 21, 1898 – December 21, 1980) was an American linguist, historian and radio broadcaster, who is most remembered by those interested in the foundations of English settlement in North America, for his detailed investigations into and documentation of the life of the pioneering adventurer, colonialist and proto-“travel writer”, Captain John Smith. At an earlier stage in his rather varied career, Barbour played a key role in the creation of Radio Free Europe after World War II.

== Early life ==
Philip Lemont Barbour was born in Louisville, Kentucky, on December 21, 1898. His father was Dr. Philip Foster Barbour (born February 24, 1867, in Danville, Kentucky; died November 1, 1944, aged 77, in Louisville, Kentucky) and his mother was Jessie E. Lemont (born April 28, 1872, Louisville, Kentucky; died March 7, 1947, in New York, New York aged 74). His parents were married on October 29, 1891, in Louisville.

By 1900, Philip's father, Dr. Philip Barbour, was practicing as a physician in Louisville, having graduated from the Hospital College of Medicine at the University of Louisville in 1890, and was also serving as Professor of Diseases of Children at the university.

=== Education ===
By his own account, Barbour "left high school (the Patterson-Davenport school in Louisville) without graduating to enter Columbia and (he) left Columbia because (he) wanted to get to know people rather than to know too many languages." Barbour earlier had claimed that he had enrolled at Columbia University as a freshman, studying history and languages although there is no record of a Philip Barbour in the alumni records of Columbia University for the years 1914 to 1920. There is, however, record of a “Lamont Barbour” (possibly a misspelling of his middle name, Lemont) as having attended but left without graduating in 1918.

In the same interview, Barbour also said that he attended Cornell University between 1917 and 1919. This claim is supported by his draft record which identifies him as a student at Cornell University and by the Cornell University Class Records for 1919 which identify him as a junior. He was pleased to note that he also left Cornell without obtaining a degree.

While he was at University, there were several developments involving his close family.

First, on June 15, 1917, his older sister, Ruth married an Army reservist named Harold Albert Lamb with whom she would soon move to California. Then, on June 29, 1917, his other sister, Margaret married a naval officer named Douglas Murray who was soon to leave on active duty.

In 1918, his mother, Jessie and her second husband, Hans Trausil, published their translation of “Poems” by Rainer Maria Rilke with an introduction by H. T. (that is, Hans Trausil). The dedication reads “To the Memory of Auguste Rodin through whom I came to know Rainer Maria Rilke”.

Finally, on November 24, 1918, Philip's maternal grandmother, Emma Lemont, died leaving a modest inheritance to his mother, her brother, Seward, and two of her three children (including Philip).

== Career ==
=== The 1920s: a quick marriage and divorce and work as a journalist in Italy ===
During the early 1920s, there are traces of Barbour's movements in the southern states and Mexico. In May 1920, a Mr. Philip L. Barbour is noted as checking into the Adams Hotel in Phoenix, Arizona. In June 1924, there is a record of him arriving at San Pedro, California, from Mazatlan, Mexico.

Consistent with these movements, the next record of Barbour's movements is an announcement in an El Paso, TX newspaper of a marriage between Philip Lemont Barbour and a Consuelo Seggerman (born February 24, 1902; died January 1, 1973) the daughter of a prominent El Paso pioneering family. The newspaper account mentions that the couple will make their home in Mexico City “where Mr. Barbour has business interests.” The article also mentions that Mr. Barbour was a graduate of Cornell University.

The marriage did not last long; possibly as little as 12 months. A 1929 El Paso newspaper article announced that Consuelo Seggerman had been granted a divorce from Philip Barbour on the grounds of cruelty. The article reported that Ms. Seggerman had been so badly treated by her husband that she had a nervous breakdown, that her maiden name had been restored to her, and that Mr. Barbour was believed to be living in Rome, Italy.

Even before this time, an arrival card dated March 18, 1927, has Philip L. Barbour, traveling alone, arriving in San Francisco from Manzanillo, Mexico, having departed March 7 aboard the SS City of San Francisco. By his own account, Barbour moved to Italy that same year and stayed there through to 1934 working first as a newspaper correspondent for Hearst newspapers based in their Rome office and then on radio work (employer not specified) elsewhere in Italy.

By this time, it is likely that Barbour had made a good start in mastering the seven languages that he would eventually achieve fluency in during his life, namely, in addition to English; Italian, Spanish, French, German, Portuguese and Russian. He claimed that he had become proficient in French and German before he was eight years old due to encouragement by his parents. He also claimed that he was a top student in Latin as well.

=== 1930s ===
Towards the end of his time in Italy, Barbour said that he succeeded in securing one or more fellowships from the Rockefeller Foundation to study long range, short-wave radio broadcasting in Europe. He claimed, in an interview given towards the end of his life, that he entered into radio broadcasting after meeting Guglielmo Marconi who lamented to him that no-one was utilizing the potential of radio as an educational tool and encouraged Barbour to get into radio work.

After he returned to the US in 1937, Barbour became director of Inter-American Broadcasts at radio station WIXAL, Boston in 1937, joining a growing movement attempting to promote the use of short wave radio as an international cultural and political tool. In November 1937, he gave a widely reported speech at the 2nd National Conference on Educational Broadcasting in Chicago in his capacity as director of a plan for collaboration of the nations of the western hemisphere in a series of cultural programs.

At this time, Barbour, although only 39 years old, was being described as a “short-wave radio expert and a master of 7 languages

In 1938, Barbour was appointed as Chief of Foreign Press and Station Relations of the International Division of the National Broadcasting Company (NBC) in New York. At the time, NBC was one of the biggest players in the short-wave radio broadcasting sector although, like everyone else, it never succeeded in making it commercially viable.

=== 1940s: World War II and its aftermath ===
Barbour remained in his job with NBC through to 1941, during which time (according to the 1940 census) he moved in with his mother, Jessie, in a house that she had owned since at least 1935, in Norwalk, Connecticut. Both he and his mother, whose occupation is listed as self-employed author, are described in the census tables as being divorced.

In 1942, Barbour was appointed to a position in the Office of the Coordinator of Inter-American Affairs, Council of National Defense, probably as a direct result of his previous connections with the Rockefeller Foundation (the Council of National Defense had been set up by the Roosevelt administration in 1940 and Nelson Rockefeller had been appointed as its inaugural director). Early the same year, (February 16, 1942), Barbour enrolled for the draft. Once the US entered the war, he joined the US Army and rose from private to Captain between 1942 and 1946. After attending officer's school he was attached to General Eisenhower's staff at Supreme HQ in London.

While he was serving, his father Dr. Philip Foster Barbour died in Louisville KY (November 1, 1944) and was buried at Cave Hill Cemetery. His second wife, Elizabeth Akin Barbour pre-deceased him (November 28, 1940).

After the cessation of hostilities in Europe, Barbour was appointed as Chief of Political Intelligence, Berlin Sector, US Military Government, serving from 1946 to 1948. During this period, his mother Jessie Trausil also died.

In 1948, Barbour was appointed and served briefly as Control Officer for Radio in the American Sector in Berlin after which he embarked on a world tour before returning to the US. On his return to the US, he became one of the first employees of Radio Free Europe, coordinating and supervising production of educational and historical programs by natives of the countries to whom they were broadcasting. He served from 1948 to 1953.

=== 1950s: retirement and commencement of a full-time writing career ===
In 1953, he retired and moved into a newly purchased property in Newtown, Connecticut. His first task was to completely remodel a large barn on the property, converting it into a substantial home in which he lived for the rest of his life. An article in the Bridgeport Sunday Post of January 22, 1967, described the house as having “complete living quarters downstairs, bedrooms, living room, kitchen and baths handsomely finished. Upstairs, a huge fireplace with 33-foot chimney dominates a large library with a wide range of reference books and many maps. He also has a microfilm reader and orders many books needed for his research on microfilm”.

It was during this period that researched and wrote the books on John Smith and other aspects of the first English settlement in the Americas at Jamestown, Virginia for which he later became most notable.

=== Death ===
He died of a heart attack on December 21, 1980, in Petersburg, Virginia, and was buried in the Mapleshade Cemetery, Ridgefield, Connecticut. The death certificate recorded, incorrectly, that he had never married. He was still working on his final publication, "The complete works of Captain John Smith (1580-1631)" at the time of his death.

== Legacy ==
As a result of the publication of Philip L. Barbour's biography of Captain John Smith, his first book on the colonial experience, Barbour moved into the “forefront of the biographers of the early colonial period” in the opinion of Professor David Beers Quinn. Barbour's book was described as being “close to...the definitive work on the remarkable career of a controversial man,” notable for its meticulous scholarship and abundance of detail, and the “best modern biography of John Smith.

The main significance of Barbour's work was that it comprehensively and convincingly refuted the claims of a series of late 19th century attacks on Smith launched by, amongst others and most famously, Henry Adams, as part of what became a sectional battle between southern writers and a so-called “Yankee conspiracy” to defame Smith.

Barbour's next great lasting contribution to the literature on colonial America was the posthumous publication of his collected works of John Smith. Barbour's work comprehensively replaced the previous compendium compiled in the 1880s by Edward Arber and re-published in 1910, which is now widely considered to be incomplete. Barbour's work was widely praised for its "scrupulous editing and annotations and the clear identifications of appropriation, dubious authorship and redundancy". The book was considered to have "few rivals among the published writings of southern colonists", was described as being "a major achievement" and a “vast improvement over its predecessors."

The significance of this work has not diminished over the passage of time since its publication. As recently as 2007, Yale University's Professor Jill Lepore, in the course of reviewing the ongoing debate about the role of John Smith in the early colonization of America, observed that recent publications would "never replace Philip L. Barbour's magnificently annotated and definitive three-volume "Complete Works of Captain John Smith,...".

== Bibliography ==
=== Books by Philip L. Barbour ===
- Boris Godunov LCCN 53009090 by Pushkin, Aleksandr Sergeevich, 1799–1837 with translation and notes by Philip L. Barbour. Published New York, Columbia University Press, 1953.
- The Three Worlds of Captain John Smith, LCCN 64010543 by Barbour, Philip L. Published Boston, Houghton Mifflin, 1964.
- Dimitry, called the Pretender, Tsar and Great Prince of all Russia, 1605-1606 LCCN 66012062 by Philip L. Barbour. Illustrated with photos. and with maps and tables by Samuel H. Bryant. Houghton Mifflin, 1966.
- The Jamestown voyages under the first charter, 1606-1609: documents relating to the foundation of Jamestown and the history of the Jamestown colony up to the departure of Captain John Smith, last president of the council in Virginia under the first charter, early in October 1609 LCCN 68023173 Edited by Philip L. Barbour. Published for the Hakluyt Society [by] Cambridge U.P., 1969.
- Pocahontas and her world; a chronicle of America's first settlement in which is related the story of the Indians and the Englishmen, particularly Captain John Smith, Captain Samuel Argall, and Master John Rolfe LCCN 70100621 by Philip L. Barbour. Published Boston, Houghton Mifflin, 1970
- The complete works of Captain John Smith (1580-1631) LCCN 81010364 by Smith, John, 1580-1631 edited by Philip L. Barbour. Published Chapel Hill for the Institute of Early American History and Culture, Williamsburg, Va. by the University of North Carolina Press, 1986.

=== Other publications ===
- Barbour, Phillip L. (1971) The Earliest Reconnaissance of the Chesapeake Bay Area: Captain John Smith's Map and Indian Vocabulary. Pt.I, Virginia Magazine of History and Biography, Vol.79.
- Barbour, Phillip L. (1972) The Earliest Reconnaissance of the Chesapeake Bay Area: Captain John Smith's Map and Indian Vocabulary", Pt. II, Virginia Magazine of History and Biography, Vol.80.
- Barbour, Philip L. (1973) The Function of Comparative Linguistics in the Study of Early Transcriptions of Indian Words, Studies in Linguistics, XXIII, 3–11.
