= Barber Lake (Alberta) =

Lake in Alberta, Canada

- Location within Alberta
- Location: Alberta, Canada
- Group: Lake
- Coordinates: 58.1033333°N 110.8591667°W

Barber Lake is a lake in Alberta, Canada.

Barber Lake has the name of H. G. Barber.

== See also ==
- List of lakes of Alberta
