= Barber Creek =

Stream in Georgia, U.S.

Coordinates: 33°54′43″N 83°24′11″W

Barber Creek is a stream in the U.S. state of Georgia. It is a tributary to McNutt Creek.

Barber Creek was named after Robert Barber, a pioneer citizen. A variant name is "Barbers Creek".
