= Junior F.J.T.A. =

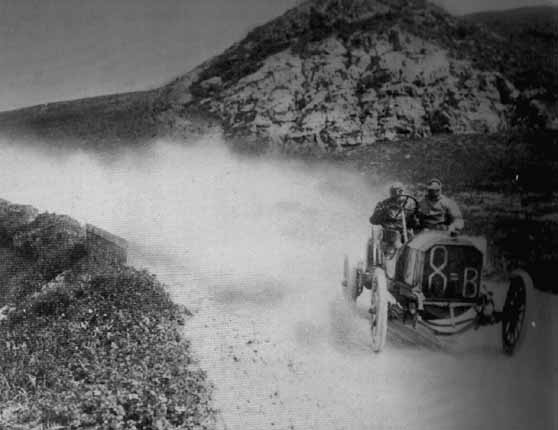
1907 Targa Florio - Vittorio Gremo in a Junior 28/40 finished 16th

Fabbrica Junior Torinese d'Automobili, Ceirano Junior, Junior F.J.T.A., was an Italian automobile manufacturer based in Turin which was founded by Giovanni Ceirano in 1905. The Junior, often known as F.J.T.A., was made from 1905 until 1909 (or 1910.)

== Background ==
The Ceirano brothers, Giovanni Battista, Giovanni, Ernesto and Matteo, were influential in the founding of the Italian auto industry, being variously responsible for : Ceirano; Welleyes (the technical basis of F.I.A.T.); Fratelli Ceirano; S.T.A.R. / Rapid (Società Torinese Automobili Rapid); Junior F.J.T.A. - (Fabbrica Junior Torinese d'Automobili); SCAT (Società Ceirano Automobili Torino); Itala and S.P.A. (Società Piemontese Automobili). Giovanni's son Giovanni "Ernesto" was also influential, co-founding Ceirano Fabbrica Automobili (aka Giovanni Ceirano Fabbrica Automobili) and Fabrica Anonima Torinese Automobili (FATA).

In 1888, after eight years apprenticeship at his father's watch-making business, Giovanni Battista started building Welleyes bicycles, so named because English names had more sales appeal. In October 1898 Giovanni Battista and Matteo co-founded Ceirano GB & C and started producing the Welleyes motor car in 1899. In July 1899 the plant and patents were sold to Giovanni Agnelli and produced as the first F.I.A.T.s - the Fiat 4 HP. Giovanni Battista was employed by Fiat as the agent for Italy, but within a year he left to found Fratelli Ceirano & C. which in 1903 became Società Torinese Automobili Rapid (S.T.A.R.) building cars badged as 'Rapid'. In 1904 Matteo Ceirano left Ceirano GB & C to create his own brand - Itala. In 1905 Giovanni also left Ceirano GB & C to found his own company - Fabbrica Junior Torinese d'Automobili, branded as Junior and F.J.T.A.

== History ==
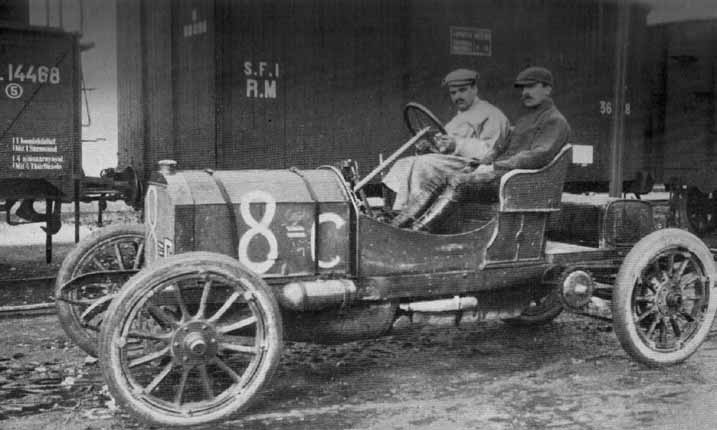
1907 Targa Florio - Guido de Martino in a Junior 28/40 from Fabbrica Junior Torinese d'Automobili

In 1904 Giovanni Ceirano founded the car manufacturer 'Ceirano Junior & C.' in Turin, but by 1905 he renamed it Fabbrica Junior Torinese d'Automobili. By 1906 he may have left or reduced his interest as he also founded S.C.A.T. (Società Ceirano Automobili Torino), also in Turin. In 1907 the company merged with Officine Turkheimer per Automobill e Velocipedi (O.T.A.V.). Production ceased in 1909 (or 1910) but 'Momo F. & C.', one of the Italian dealers, acquired the stock and sold off the remaining vehicles.

== Cars ==
Throughout the company's 5-year existence the cars were variously badged as Junior and Junior Ceirano. The range included :

- a 9.5 hp single cylinder voiturette,
- a 12/14 hp twin cylinder model
- a 16/20 hp four cylinder model which resembled the standard Mercedes designs of the period. To wit - the cylinders were cast in two blocks of two cylinders, with side valves, a T-head design and chain drive to the rear wheels.
- a 28/40 hp produced from 1907 to 1909. It used a 4-cylinder 8,000cc engine that developed 45 hp, giving a top speed of 100 km / h. It was priced at 11,500 lire for the chassis and it achieved some success in the Targa Florio of 1907 and 1908.

== Competition ==
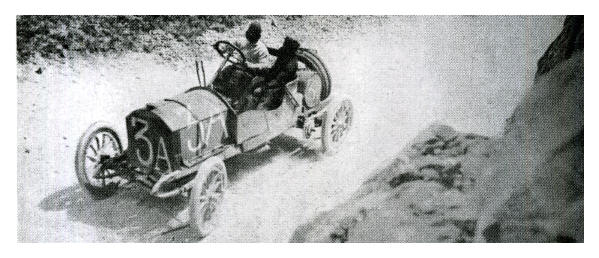
1908 Targa Florio - Giuseppe Tamagni in a Junior 16/20 FJTA

On 22 April 1907 Vittorio Gremo finished 16th at the second Targa Florio. Driving a Junior 28/40 with number "8B" for the official factory team he completed 3 laps of the Madonie circuit, covering 277.42 miles in 9 hours 13 minutes 28 seconds, and finishing 56 minutes behind the winner - Felice Nazzaro in a Fiat. His team mate Guido de Martino, driving a Junior 28/40 with number "8C", retired on the third lap, whilst Francesco Tololli, driving a Junior 28/40 with number "8A", did complete only one lap.

On 18 May 1908 Giuseppe Tamagni finished 6th at the third Targa Florio. Driving a Junior 16/20 with number 3A for the factory team he completed 3 laps of the Madonie circuit, covering 277.42 miles in 9 hours 56 minutes 9 seconds.

== See also ==
- Ceirano
- List of Italian companies
- List of automobile companies founded by the Ceirano brothers
