= Giovanni Ceirano =

Giovanni Ceirano (Cuneo, 1865 – Turin, March 30, 1948) was an Italian industrialist and automotive pioneer. He cofounded 'Junior Fabbrica Automobili Torinese' in 1905, 'Società Ceirano Automobili Torino' in 1906, 'Fabbrica Automobili Ceirano' in 1917 and 'SCAT- Ceirano' in 1923.

== Ceirano family background ==
The Ceirano brothers, Giovanni Battista, Giovanni, Ernesto and Matteo, were influential in the founding of the Italian auto industry, being variously responsible for: Ceirano; Welleyes (the technical basis of F.I.A.T.); Fratelli Ceirano; S.T.A.R. / Rapid (Società Torinese Automobili Rapid); SCAT (Società Ceirano Automobili Torino); Itala and S.P.A. (Società Piemontese Automobili). Giovanni's son Giovanni "Ernesto" was also influential, co-founding Ceirano Fabbrica Automobili (aka Giovanni Ceirano Fabbrica Automobili) and Fabrica Anonima Torinese Automobili (FATA).

In 1888, after eight years apprenticeship at his father's watch-making business, Giovanni Battista started building Welleyes bicycles, so named because English names had more sales appeal. In October 1898 Giovanni Battista and Matteo co-founded Ceirano GB & C and started producing the Welleyes motor car in 1899. In July 1899 the plant and patents were sold to Giovanni Agnelli and produced as the first F.I.A.T.s - the Fiat 4 HP. Giovanni Battista was employed by Fiat as the agent for Italy, but within a year he left to found Fratelli Ceirano & C. which in 1903 became Società Torinese Automobili Rapid (S.T.A.R.) building cars badged as 'Rapid'. In 1904 Matteo Ceirano left Ceirano GB & C to create his own brand - Itala. In 1906 Matteo left Itala to found S.P.A. (Società Piemontese Automobili) with chief designer, Alberto Ballacco. In 1906 Giovanni founded SCAT (Società Ceirano Automobili Torino) in Turin. In 1919 Giovanni and Giovanni "Ernesto" co-founded Ceirano Fabbrica Automobili (aka Giovanni Ceirano Fabbrica Automobili) and in 1922 they took control of Fabrica Anonima Torinese Automobili (FATA).

== Early life ==
Giovanni was born in Cuneo in 1865, the second of four brothers born to Giovanni Ceirano, a watchmaker, and Teresa Corino.

== History ==
In 1904 Giovanni founded the car manufacturer Ceirano Junior & C., which in 1905 changed its name to Junior Fabbrica Automobili Torinese.

In 1906 he left Junior to co-founder and become managing director of the Società Ceirano Automobili Torino (SCAT) He remained as Managing Director until 1918.

In 1919 he founded the Fabbrica Automobili Ceirano with his son Giovanni "Ernesto". Giovanni while Fabbrica Automobili managed the Ceirano gets the shares of the SCAT, getting a majority stake.

On 25 August 1923 he increased the capital of SCAT by 700,000 liras by amalgamating Fabbrica Automobili Ceirano with 'SCAT' to form SCAT-Ceirano.

In 1929 SCAT-Ceirano suffers economic difficulties and FIAT acquired a controlling interest. In 1931 he left SCAT-Ceirano.

In 1934 he acquired the car company Fabrica Anonima Torinese Automobili (FATA) again with his son Giovanni "Ernesto". Fiat had imposed legal restrictions on the sale of SCAT-Ceirano preventing him from being an automotive manufacturer, so the FATA business was reoriented to make auto parts in 1945.

== Death ==
Giovanni Ceirano died in La Cassa on March 30, 1948.

== See also ==
- List of automobile companies founded by the Ceirano brothers
- Aurea (car)
