= 1907 Targa Florio =

Motorist road race

The 1907 Targa Florio was a Grand Prix motor race held at Madonie on 22 April 1907. It was run over 3 laps of the 92.473 mile circuit, totaling 277.42 miles.

== Results ==
Pos	No	Driver	Car	Laps	Time/Retired
1	20B	(Italy) Felice Nazzaro	Fiat	3	8h17m36.4s
2	20A	(Italy) Vincenzo Lancia	Fiat	3	+11m53.0s
3	21B	(France) Maurice Fabry	Itala	3	+15m11.2s
4	11A	(Belgium) Arthur Duray	Lorraine-Dietrich	3	+21m30.0s
5	21A	(Italy) Alessandro Cagno	Itala	3	+21m39.8s
6	11B	(France) Fernand Gabriel	Lorraine-Dietrich	3	+22m9.8s
7	7D	(Italy) Giuseppe Tamagni	Isotta Fraschini	3	+24m9.2s
8	20C	(Germany) Aldo Weilschott	Fiat	3	+25m16.0s
9	7C	(France) Marc Sorel	Isotta Fraschini	3	+34m34.2s
10	7B	(Italy) Ferdinando Minoia	Isotta Fraschini	3	+35m43.2s
11	9A	(France) Pierre Garcet	Clément-Bayard	3	+36m4.6s
12	4A	(Italy) Enrico Maggioni	Zust	3	+42m31.0s
13	14A	(Italy) Domenico Masino	de Luca-Daimler	3	+43m45.8s
14	19A	(France) "Dureste"	Gobron-Brillié	3	+52m47.6s
15	23A	(Germany) Fritz Erle	Benz	3	+53m39.2s
16	8B	(Italy) Vittorio Gremo	Junior F.J.T.A.	3	+56m2.0s
17	23C	(Germany) Dietrich Spamann	Benz	3	+58m20.2s
18	16A	(Italy) Felice Buzio	Diatto-Clément	3	+1h2m29.0s
19	9B	Richard Gaudeman	Clément-Bayard	3	+1h11m24.0s
20	14C	(France) Hubert Le Blon	de Luca-Daimler	3	+1h13m56.0s
21	4B	(Italy) Mario Conti	Zust	3	+1h20m23.0s
22	9C	(France) Léon Collinet	Clément-Bayard	3	+1h21m40.8s
23	6B	(Italy) "Gallina"	Rapid	3	+1h32m33.6s
24	23B	Clemente de Bojano	Benz	3	+1h35m32.2s
25	4C	(Italy) Leonino de Zara	Zust	3	+1h41m17.2s
26	14B	(France) Victor Hémery	de Luca-Daimler	3	+1h58m39.0s
27	17A	"Gaste"	Radia-l'Automotrice	3	+2h15m44.6s
28	17B	Edoardo Marnier	Radia-l'Automotrice	3	+2h31m36.4s
29	19B	(France) "Favre"	Gobron-Brillié	3	+2h59m39.2s
30	1B	(Italy) Carlo Pizzagalli	Pilain	3	+3h24m16.6s
Ret	3A	(France) Louis Wagner	Darracq	2	Half Shaft
Ret	8C	(Italy) Guido de Martino	Junior F.J.T.A.	2	Retired
Ret	6A	(Italy) Ernesto Ceirano	Rapid	2	Retired
Ret	19C	(France) "Douet"	Gobron-Brillié	2	Retired
Ret	2A	(Germany) Friedrich Opel	Opel	1	Retired
Ret	7A	(Italy) Vincenzo Trucco	Isotta Fraschini	1	Retired
Ret	3B	(France) René Hanriot	Darracq	1	Half Shaft
Ret	6C	(Italy) Tallio Cariolato	Rapid	1	Retired
Ret	8A	(Italy) Francesco Tololli	Junior F.J.T.A.	0	Retired
Ret	10A	(France) Victor Rigal	Berliet	0	Retired
Ret	10B	(France) Jean Porporato	Berliet	0	Retired
Ret	18A	Otto Hieronimus	Gaggenau	0	Retired
Ret	1A	(Italy) Philippe Salviani	Pilain	0	Retired
Ret	22A	Bernhard Caspar	Ajax	0	Retired
Ret	18B	"Hube"	Gaggenau	0	Retired
Ret	4D	(Italy) Giancarlo Capuggi	Zust	0	Retired
DNS	5A	(France) Paul Rivierne	Couverchal		Did Not Appear
DNS	12A	unknown	Métallurgique		Did Not Appear
DNS	13A	(France) "Besson"	Lucia		Did Not Appear
DNS	15A	"Picklen"	Charron		Did Not Appear

== See also ==
- 1906 Targa Florio

== Sources ==
II Targa Florio

<La Saga des Pilain Lyonnaises, Claude Rouxel, editions du Palmier 2008>
