= Giovanni "Ernesto" Ceirano =

Italian businessman

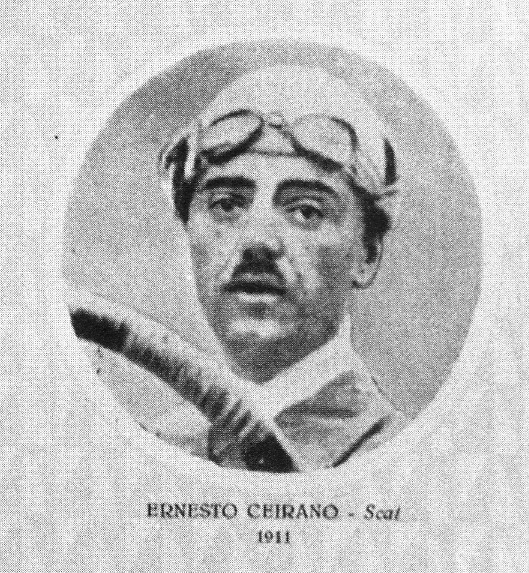
Winner of 1911 Targa Florio, Giovanni Ernesto Ceirano driving S.C.A.T.

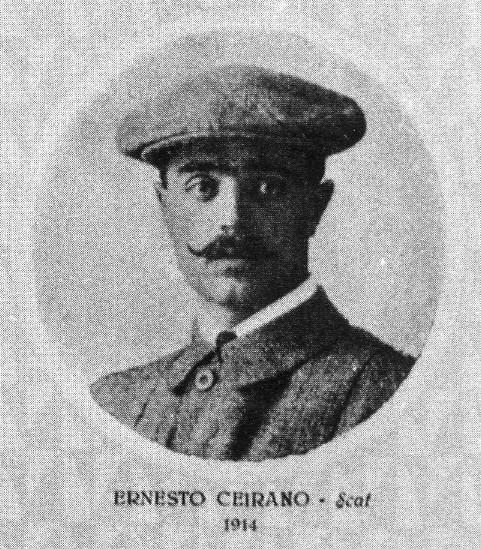
1914 Targa Florio winner - Giovanni 'Ernesto' Ceirano

Giovanni "Ernesto" Ceirano (1889-1956) was an Italian industrialist, son of Giovanni Ceirano, co-founder of Fabbrica Automobili Ceirano, co-owner of Aurea (Fabrica Anonima Torinese Automobili -F.A.T.A.) and two-time winner of the Targa Florio. (Note: There is some lack of clarity among sources and translations between Ernesto Ceirano and Giovanni Ceirano's son 'Giovanni junior' who was nicknamed "Ernesto".)

== Ceirano family background ==
The Ceirano brothers, Giovanni Battista, Giovanni, Ernesto and Matteo, were influential in the founding of the Italian auto industry, being variously responsible for : Ceirano; Welleyes (the technical basis of F.I.A.T.); Fratelli Ceirano; S.T.A.R. / Rapid (Società Torinese Automobili Rapid); SCAT (Società Ceirano Automobili Torino); Itala and S.P.A. (Società Piemontese Automobili). Giovanni's son Giovanni "Ernesto" was also influential, co-founding Ceirano Fabbrica Automobili (aka Giovanni Ceirano Fabbrica Automobili) and Fabrica Anonima Torinese Automobili (FATA).

In 1888, after eight years apprenticeship at his father's watch-making business, Giovanni Battista started building Welleyes bicycles, so named because English names had more sales appeal. In October 1898 Giovanni Battista and Matteo co-founded Ceirano GB & C and started producing the Welleyes motor car in 1899. In July 1899 the plant and patents were sold to Giovanni Agnelli and produced as the first F.I.A.T.s - the Fiat 4 HP. Giovanni Battista was employed by Fiat as the agent for Italy, but within a year he left to found Fratelli Ceirano & C. which in 1903 became Società Torinese Automobili Rapid (S.T.A.R.) building cars badged as 'Rapid'. In 1904 Matteo Ceirano left Ceirano GB & C to create his own brand - Itala. In 1906 Matteo left Itala to found S.P.A. (Società Piemontese Automobili) with chief designer, Alberto Ballacco. In 1906 Giovanni founded SCAT (Società Ceirano Automobili Torino) in Turin. In 1919 Giovanni and Giovanni "Ernesto" co-founded Ceirano Fabbrica Automobili (aka Giovanni Ceirano Fabbrica Automobili) and in 1922 they took control of Fabrica Anonima Torinese Automobili (FATA).

== Career ==
=== Racing ===
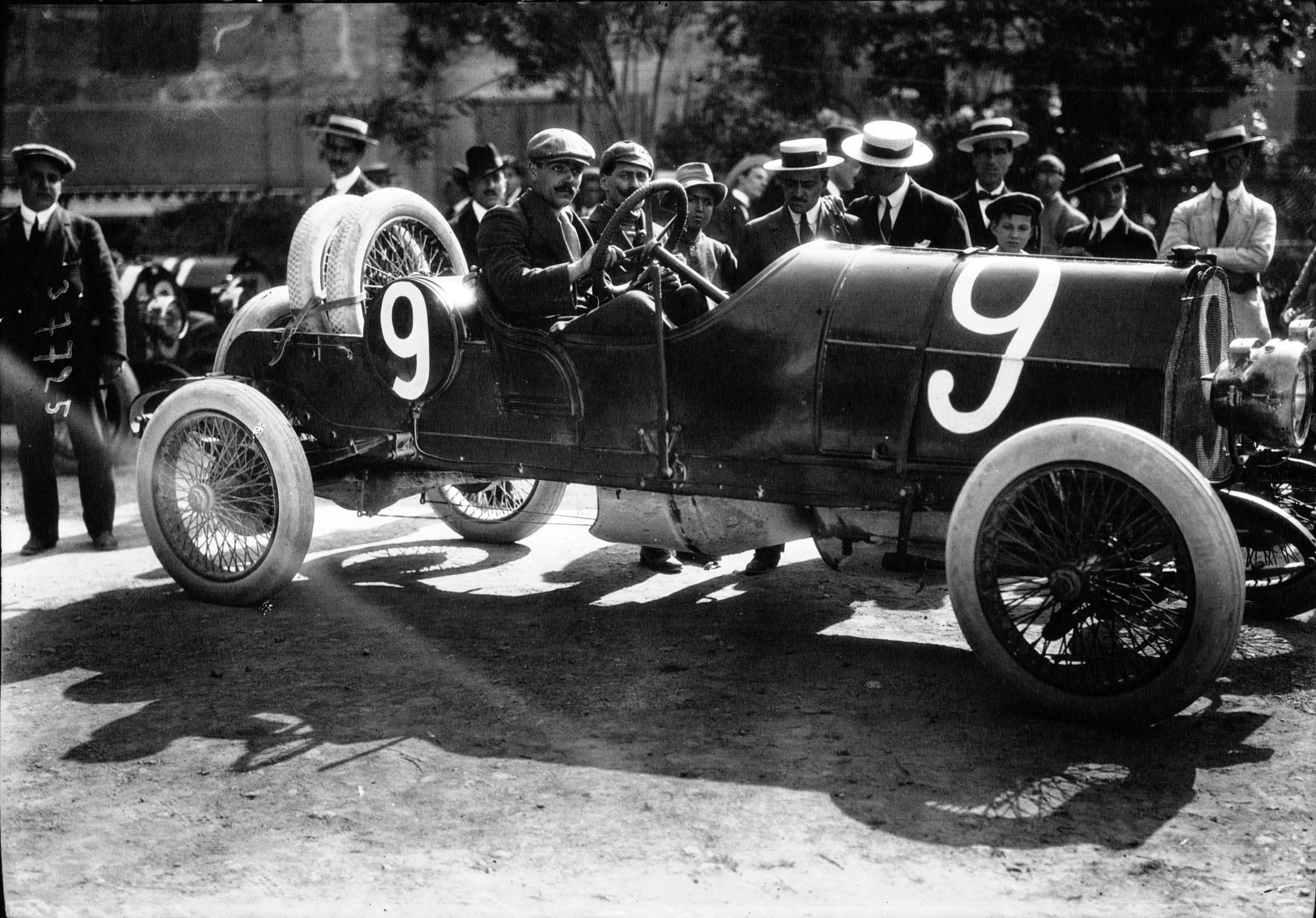
1913 Targa Florio - Giovanni 'Ernesto' Ceirano driving S.C.A.T.

In 1911 he won the Targa Florio driving his father Giovanni's SCAT 22/32 HP (4398 cc), he completed the 3 laps of the Grande Circuit of the Targa Florio, covering the 446-kilometre (277 mi) in 9 hours 32 minutes 22 seconds, an average speed of 46.8 km/h.

In 1914 he drove his father Giovanni's SCAT 25/35 (4,398 cc) to his second victory in the Targa Florio, completing a single 979 km lap of the island in 16 hours 51 minutes 31 seconds at an average speed of 58.07 km/h.

=== Industry ===
In 1919 he co-founded the Fabbrica Automobili Ceirano with his father Giovanni.

In 1934 he acquired the car company FATA (Fabrica Anonima Torinese Automobili) again with his father Giovanni. Fiat had imposed legal restrictions on Giovanni during the sale of SCAT-Ceirano, preventing him from being an automotive manufacturer, so the FATA business was reorientated to make auto parts. It ceased activity in 1945.

== Death ==
Giovanni Ceirano died in La Cassa on March 30, 1948.

== See also ==
- List of automobile companies founded by the Ceirano brothers
- Aurea (car)
