= Fratelli Ceirano =

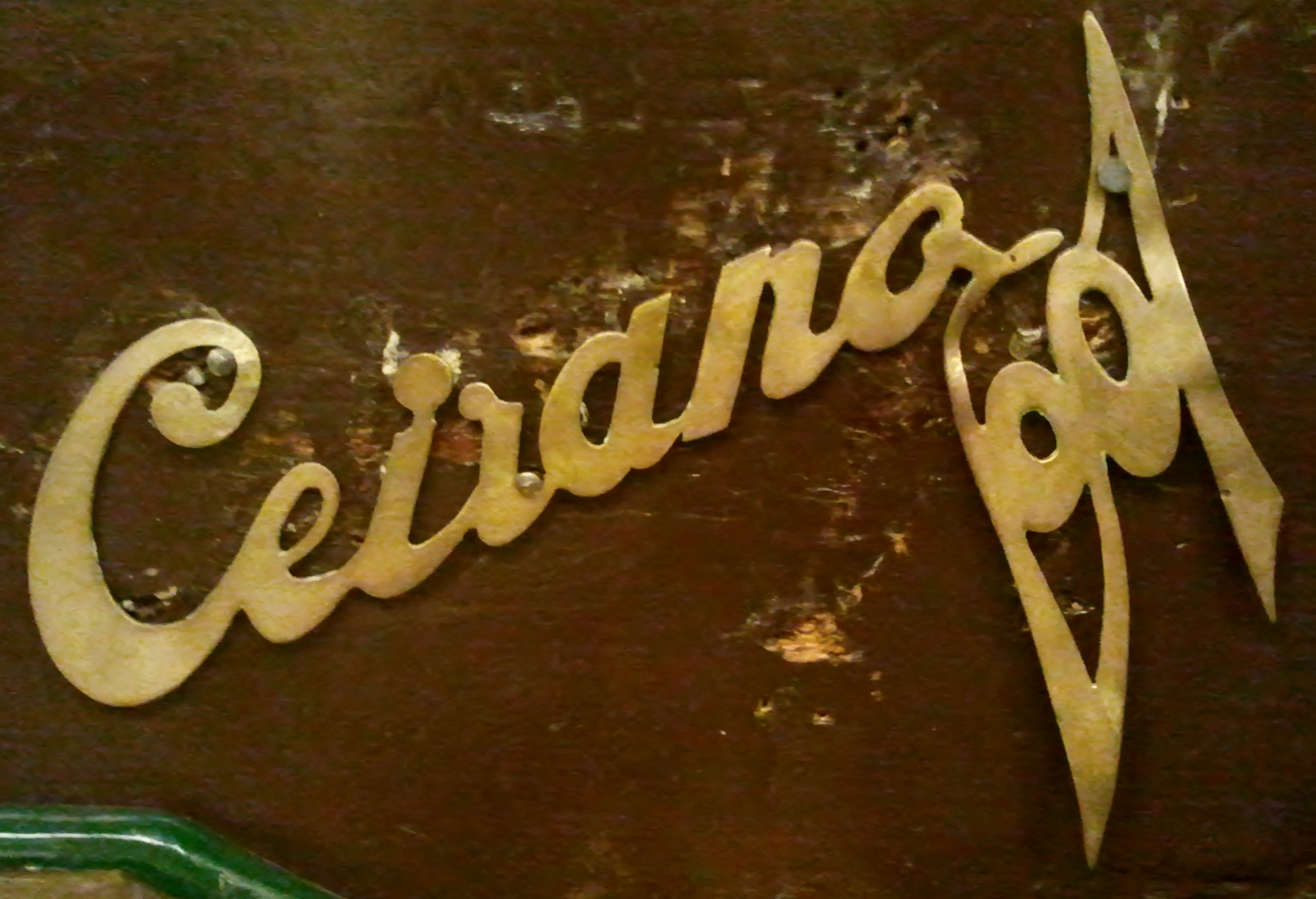
- Type: Private
- Industry: Automobile industry
- Founded: 1901
- Founder: Giovanni Battista Ceirano
- Defunct: 1903
- Fate: Taken over by : Società Torinese Automobili Rapid S.T.A.R. Rapid
- Successor: Società Torinese Automobili Rapid S.T.A.R. Rapid
- Headquarters: Turin, Italy
- Area served: Italy
- Products: Automobiles

Fratelli Ceirano & C was an Italian automobile manufacturer founded in 1901 by Giovanni Battista Ceirano and his brother Matteo Ceirano after they had left F.I.A.T. Their own automobile manufacturing business, Ceirano GB & C and its Welleyes motorcar, had been taken over by Giovanni Agnelli and his new F.I.A.T. consortium in 1899, whereupon the Welleyes was marketed as the F.I.A.T. 4HP, the first ever Fiat. The Ceiranos were not satisfied as employees and 'Italian sales agents' of F.I.A.T. so they founded Fratelli Ceirano & C in Turin, which, by July 1903 had morphed into Società Torinese Automobili Rapid (S.T.A.R.), and the cars were badged as Rapid.

== Ceirano family background ==
The Ceirano brothers, Giovanni Battista, Giovanni, Ernesto and Matteo, were influential in the founding of the Italian auto industry, being variously responsible for : Ceirano; Welleyes (the technical basis of F.I.A.T.); Fratelli Ceirano; S.T.A.R. / Rapid (Società Torinese Automobili Rapid); SCAT (Società Ceirano Automobili Torino); Itala and S.P.A. (Società Piemontese Automobili). Giovanni's son Giovanni "Ernesto" was also influential, co-founding Ceirano Fabbrica Automobili (aka Giovanni Ceirano Fabbrica Automobili) and Fabrica Anonima Torinese Automobili (FATA).

In 1888, after eight years apprenticeship at his father's watch-making business, Giovanni Battista started building Welleyes bicycles, so named because English names had more sales appeal. In October 1898 Giovanni Battista and Matteo co-founded Ceirano GB & C and started producing the Welleyes motor car in 1899. In July 1899 the plant and patents were sold to Giovanni Agnelli and produced as the first F.I.A.T.s - the Fiat 4 HP. Giovanni Battista was employed by Fiat as the agent for Italy, but within a year he left to found Fratelli Ceirano & C. which in 1903 became Società Torinese Automobili Rapid (S.T.A.R.) building cars badged as 'Rapid'. In 1904 Matteo Ceirano left Ceirano GB & C to create his own brand - Itala. In 1906 Matteo left Itala to found S.P.A. (Società Piemontese Automobili) with chief designer, Alberto Ballacco. In 1906 Giovanni founded SCAT (Società Ceirano Automobili Torino) in Turin. In 1919 Giovanni and Giovanni "Ernesto" co-founded Ceirano Fabbrica Automobili (aka Giovanni Ceirano Fabbrica Automobili) and in 1922 they took control of Fabrica Anonima Torinese Automobili (FATA).

== See also ==
- List of Italian companies
- List of automobile companies founded by the Ceirano brothers
