= Società Torinese Automobili Rapid =

Italian car manufacturer

S.T.A.R., Rapid Società Torinese Automobili Rapid
- Type: Private
- Industry: Automobile industry
- Founded: 1904
- Founder: Giovanni Battista Ceirano
- Defunct: 1921 - SPA, 1925 - Fiat
- Fate: Taken over by : S.P.A. (Società Piemontese Automobili) (1921); Taken over by Fiat (1925)
- Successor: S.P.A. (Società Piemontese Automobili)
- Headquarters: Turin, Italy
- Area served: Italy
- Products: Automobiles

Società Torinese Automobili Rapid, also known as S.T.A.R. and Rapid, was an Italian car manufacturer founded by Giovanni Battista Ceirano in Turin in July 1904. Rapid was its trademark. In 1921 it was acquired by the S.P.A. (Società Piemontese Automobili) company that had been founded by Giovanni Battista's brother Matteo Ceirano, and which, in 1925, was taken over by Fiat.

== Ceirano family background ==
The Ceirano brothers, Giovanni Battista, Giovanni, Ernesto and Matteo, were influential in the founding of the Italian auto industry, being variously responsible for : Ceirano; Welleyes (the technical basis of F.I.A.T.); Fratelli Ceirano; S.T.A.R. / Rapid (Società Torinese Automobili Rapid); SCAT (Società Ceirano Automobili Torino); Itala and S.P.A. (Società Piemontese Automobili). Giovanni's son Giovanni "Ernesto" was also influential, co-founding Ceirano Fabbrica Automobili (aka Giovanni Ceirano Fabbrica Automobili) and Fabrica Anonima Torinese Automobili (FATA).

In 1888, after eight years apprenticeship at his father's watch-making business, Giovanni Battista started building Welleyes bicycles, so named because English names had more sales appeal. In October 1898 Giovanni Battista and Matteo co-founded Ceirano GB & C and started producing the Welleyes motor car in 1899. In July 1899 the plant and patents were sold to Giovanni Agnelli and produced as the first F.I.A.T.s - the Fiat 4 HP. Giovanni Battista was employed by Fiat as the agent for Italy, but within a year he left to found Fratelli Ceirano & C. which in 1903 became Società Torinese Automobili Rapid (S.T.A.R.) building cars badged as 'Rapid'. In 1904 Matteo Ceirano left Ceirano GB & C to create his own brand - Itala. In 1906 Matteo left Itala to found S.P.A. (Società Piemontese Automobili) with chief designer, Alberto Ballacco. In 1906 Giovanni founded SCAT (Società Ceirano Automobili Torino) in Turin. In 1919 Giovanni and Giovanni "Ernesto" co-founded Ceirano Fabbrica Automobili (aka Giovanni Ceirano Fabbrica Automobili) and in 1922 they took control of Fabrica Anonima Torinese Automobili (FATA).

== History ==
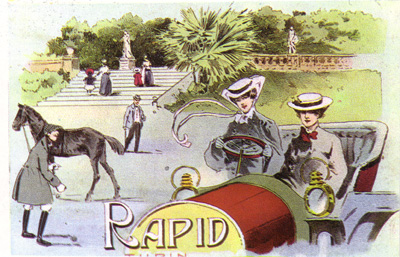
1900s S.T.A.R. Rapid poster

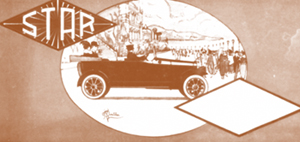
1900s S.T.A.R. Rapid poster

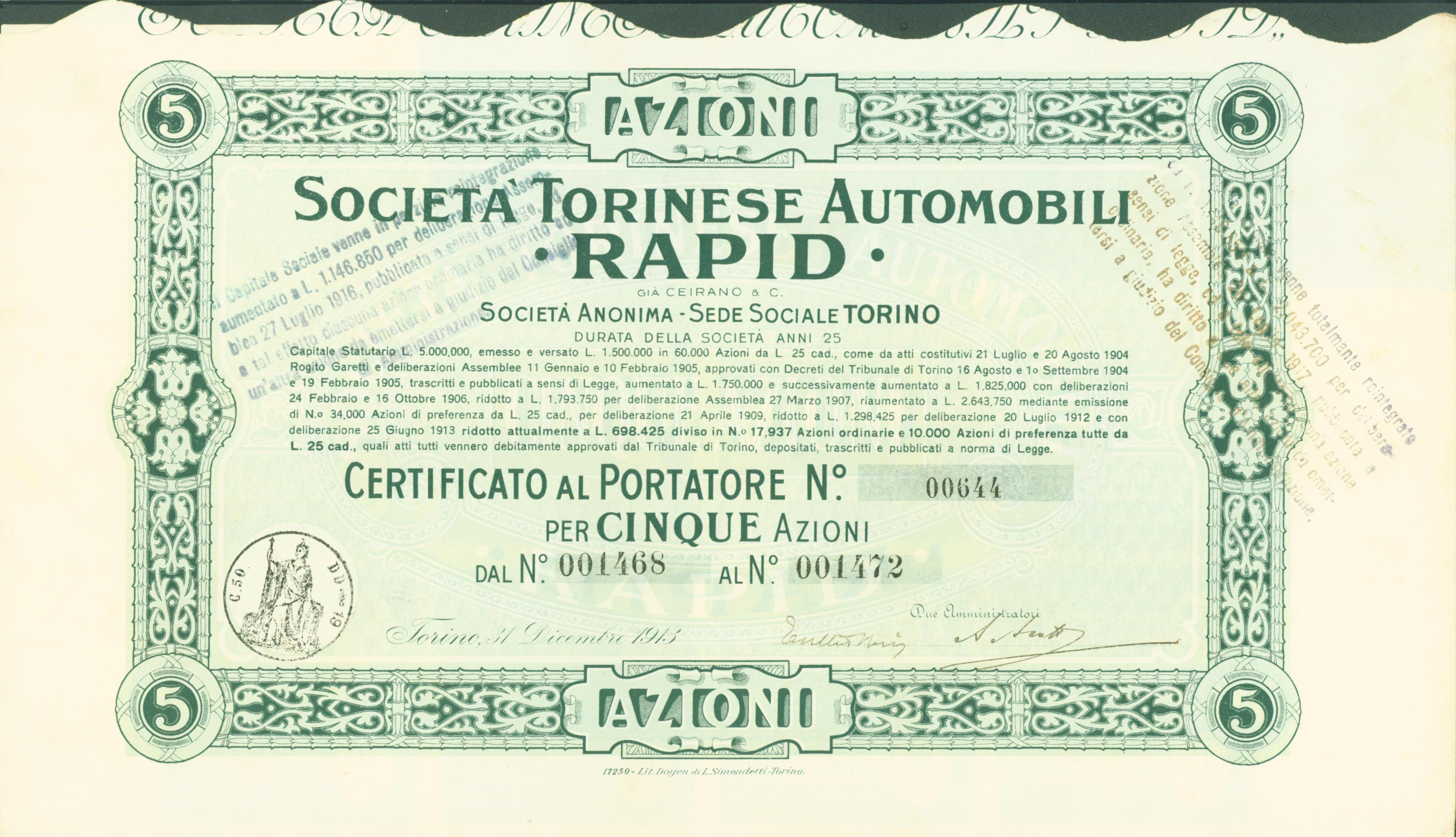
Share of the Società Torinese Automobili Rapid, issued 31 December 1913

Giovanni Bastista and Matteo Ceirano left F.I.A.T. in 1901 to found Fratelli Ceirano & C. In 1903, Matteo left to found ITALA. In 1904 Giovanni Batista Ceirano transformed Fratelli Ceirano & C. into Società Torinese Automobili Rapid, using the name Rapid as a trademark. Production moved to a 50,000 square meters plant in Barriera di Nizza, Turin, where 500 people worked. The initial share capital was 2,000,000 lire, which in 1905 amounted to 5,000,000. Annual production was 600 units per year. In the year 1911, 100 vehicles were produced.

Around 1905 Giovanni Battista suffered poor health and retired to Bordighera on the coast of Liguria, so Rodolfo Chio Maggi was appointed chief designer while Giovani Battista Maggi and Alfonso Scott took over the management.

During World War I the factory produced both trucks and armaments, up to 4,000 artillery shells per day.

After World War I, Rapid opened a repair-shop for all brands, but the aftermath of the war meant that in 1921 the company was liquidated and absorbed by S.P.A. (Società Piemontese Automobili), a company founded by Matteo Ceirano, and Cyclecar Italiana Petromilli (C.I.P.).

In 1925 Giovanni Agnelli converted the Rapid factory at Barriera di Nizza, Turin, into 'Officine Meccaniche Villar Perosa S.p.A.' (RIV) to manufacture ball bearings. In 1926 FIAT, headed by Agnelli, absorbed S.P.A. (Società Piemontese Automobili).

== Cars ==
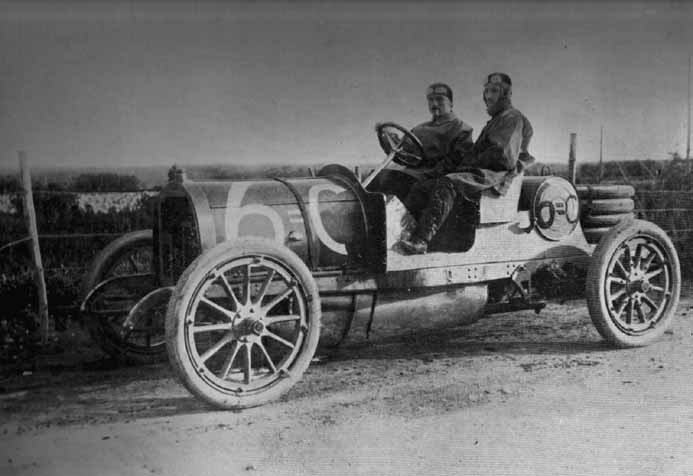
1907 Targa Florio - Cariolato in S.T.A.R. Rapid 6C

The first model was designed in 1904 by Giovanni Battista Ceirano, but later Rodolfo Chio Maggi was appointed chief designer. Between 1905 and 1907 there was a two-cylinder model and the two four-cylinder models 16/24 HP with 4562 cc engine capacity and 24/40 HP with 7432 cc capacity. A common feature of both models was the shaft transmission and the radiator front section with a flat oval profile.

In 1907 they introduced a range of 4-cylinder models with engines ranging from 1750 to 10560 cc, including the 50/70 HP.

In approximately 1913 they introduced three four-cylinder models with 1600 cc, 2000 cc and 3100 cc capacity. These also had a 4 speed gearbox and sophisticated rear suspension.

Between 1915 and 1916 the only car was a 10/12 hp model.

Between 1919 and 1921 the Type 10 was equipped with a 4-cylinder 1,592cc side valve engine.

== Competition ==
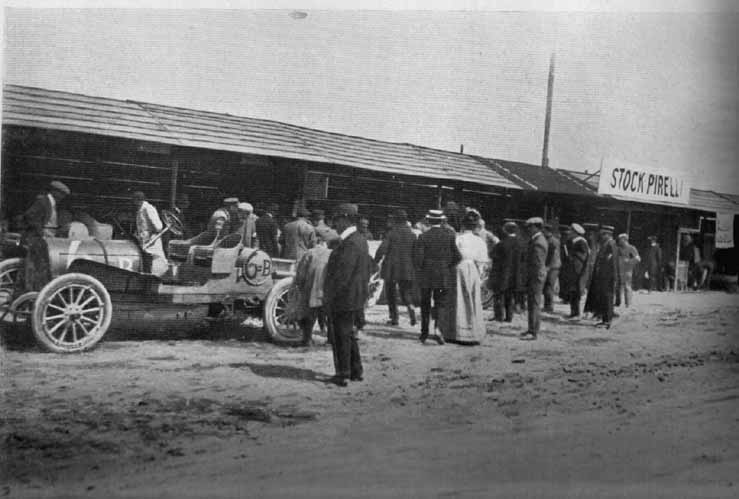
1907 Targa Florio - Gallina in STAR Rapid 6B whi finished 23rd

In 1907 three Rapid cars entered the Targa Florio. Gallina, driving car 6B, finished in 23rd position, completing the 3 laps in 9 hours, 50 minutes and 10 seconds. Ernesto Ceirano, driving car 6A, retired after 2 laps and Tallio Cariolato, driving car 6C, retired after 1 lap.

== See also ==
- List of Italian companies
- List of automobile companies founded by the Ceirano brothers
