= Ceirano Fabbrica Automobili =

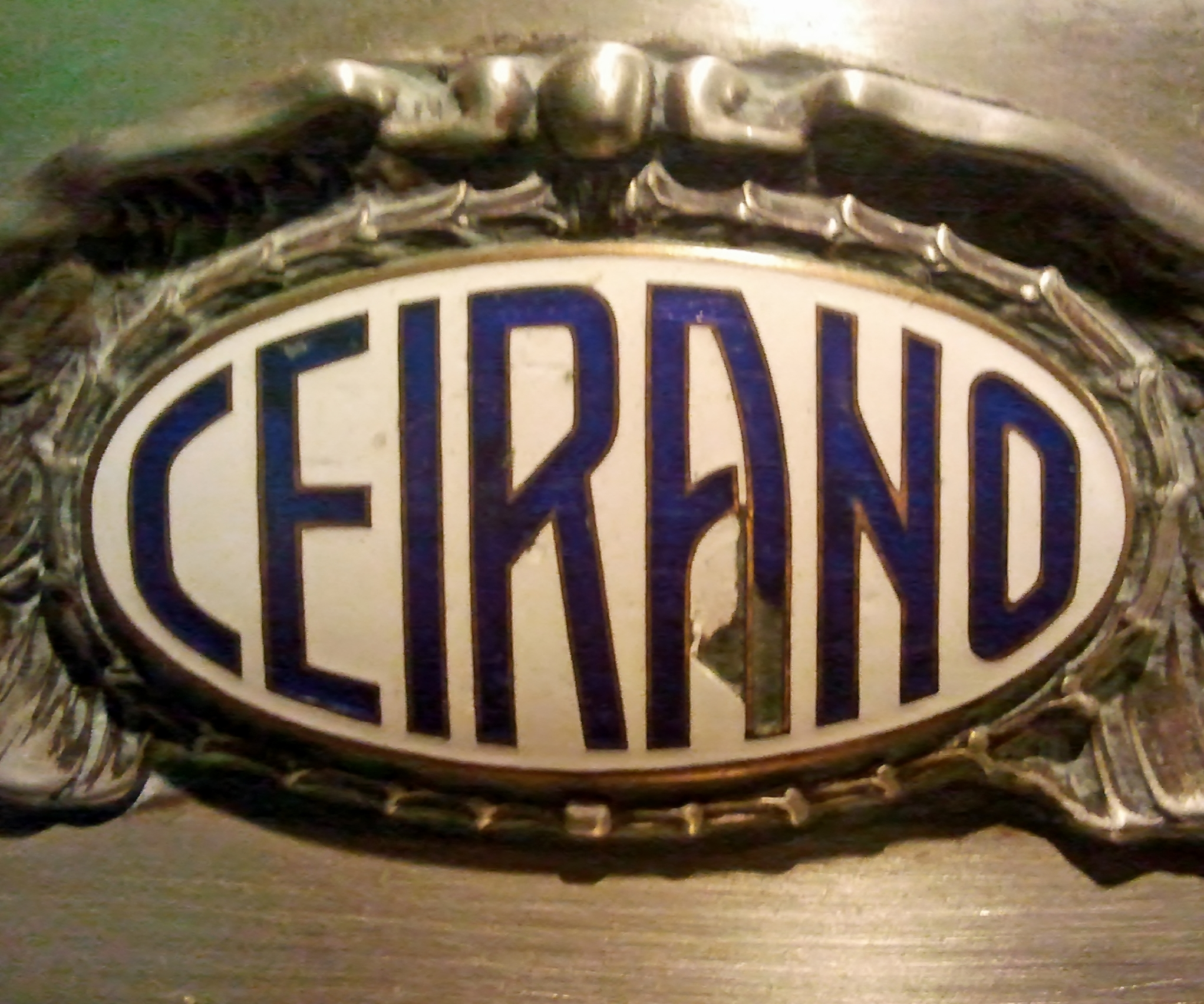
Logo of Ceirano Fabbrica Automobili

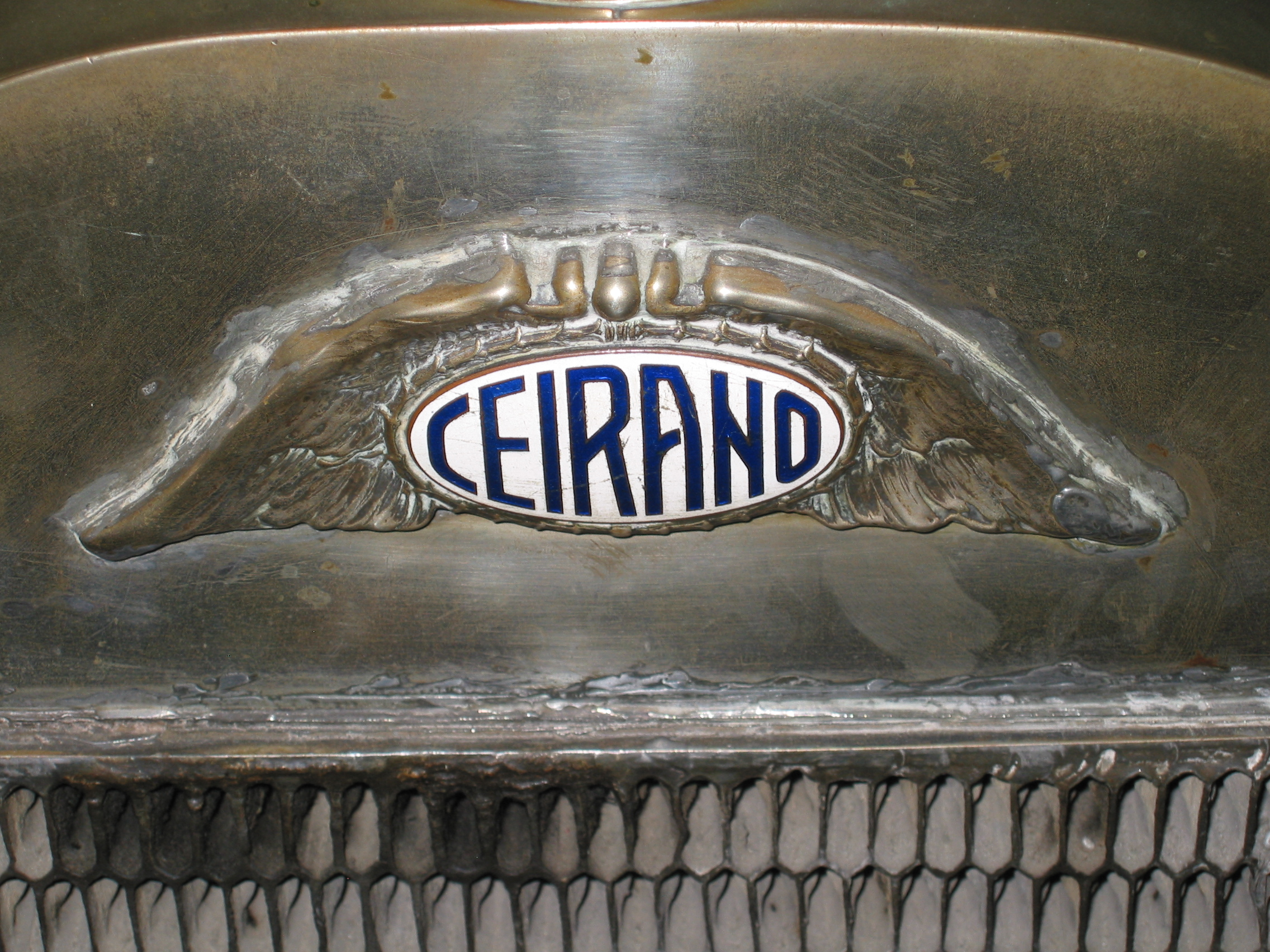
1924 Ceirano badge

Ceirano Fabbrica Automobili, or Ceirano Giovanni Fabbrica Automobili or Giovanni Ceirano Fabbrica Automobili was an Italian automobile manufacturer from Turin, founded in 1919 by Giovanni Ceirano and his son Giovanni "Ernesto" Ceirano.

The company was active from 1919 until 25 August 1923 when Giovanni amalgamated it with 'Società Ceirano Automobili Torino (S.C.A.T.), which he had founded in 1906 and left in 1917, to form SCAT-Ceirano.

== Ceirano family background ==
The Ceirano brothers, Giovanni Battista, Giovanni, Ernesto and Matteo, were influential in the founding of the Italian auto industry, being variously responsible for : Ceirano; Welleyes (the technical basis of F.I.A.T.); Fratelli Ceirano; S.T.A.R. / Rapid (Società Torinese Automobili Rapid); SCAT (Società Ceirano Automobili Torino); Itala and S.P.A. (Società Piemontese Automobili). Giovanni's son Giovanni "Ernesto" was also influential, co-founding Ceirano Fabbrica Automobili (a.k.a. Giovanni Ceirano Fabbrica Automobili) and Fabrica Anonima Torinese Automobili (FATA).

In 1888, after eight years apprenticeship at his father's watch-making business, Giovanni Battista started building Welleyes bicycles, so named because English names had more sales appeal. In October 1898 Giovanni Battista and Matteo co-founded Ceirano GB & C and started producing the Welleyes motor car in 1899. In July 1899 the plant and patents were sold to Giovanni Agnelli and produced as the first F.I.A.T.s - the Fiat 4 HP. Giovanni Battista was employed by Fiat as the agent for Italy, but within a year he left to found Fratelli Ceirano & C. which in 1903 became Società Torinese Automobili Rapid (S.T.A.R.) building cars badged as 'Rapid'. In 1904 Matteo Ceirano left Ceirano GB & C to create his own brand - Itala. In 1906 Matteo left Itala to found S.P.A. (Società Piemontese Automobili) with chief designer, Alberto Ballacco. In 1906 Giovanni founded SCAT (Società Ceirano Automobili Torino) in Turin. In 1919 Giovanni and Giovanni "Ernesto" co-founded Ceirano Fabbrica Automobili (a.k.a. Giovanni Ceirano Fabbrica Automobili) and in 1922 they took control of Fabrica Anonima Torinese Automobili (FATA).

== History ==
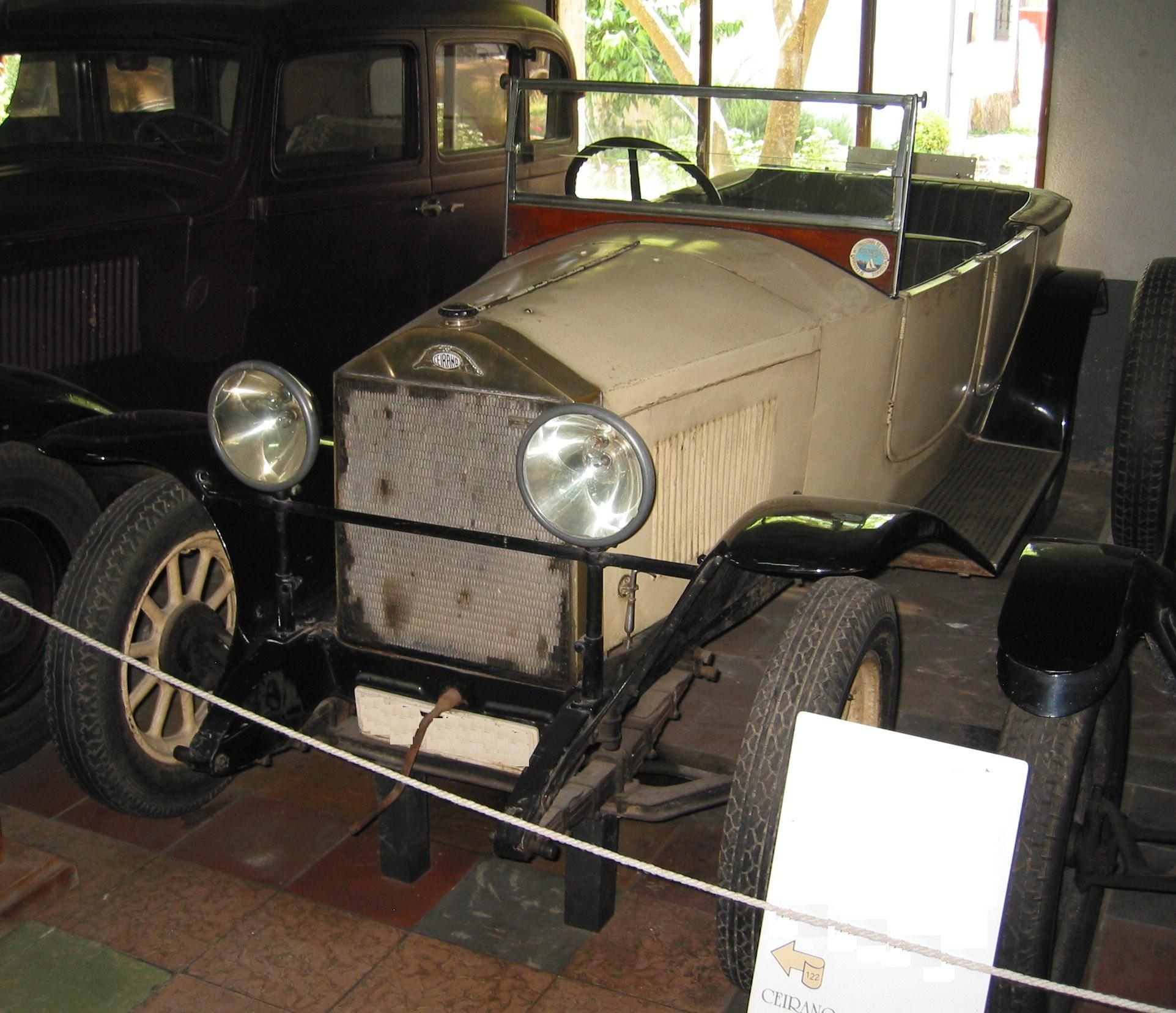
1924 Ceirano

Giovanni and Ernesto sold their main share-holding in S.C.A.T. in 1917, and in 1919 Ceirano Fabbrica Automobili's new range was based on the pre-war (1914) S.C.A.T.. At least one Ceirano ( a 1924 model ) exists today .

== See also ==
- List of Italian companies
- List of automobile companies founded by the Ceirano brothers
- Aurea (car)
