= Giovanni Battista Ceirano =

Italian businessman (1860–1912)

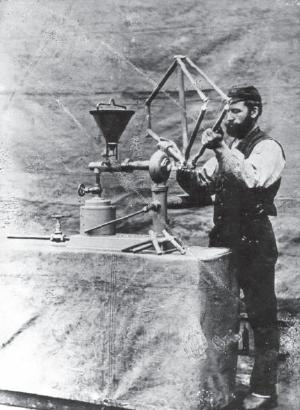
Giovanni Battista Ceirano

Giovanni Battista Ceirano (1 October 1860 – 1912) was an Italian entrepreneur and car pioneer. The first motorcar he designed and built was the Well-Eyes, but he sold the rights to Giovanni Agnelli of F.I.A.T. who manufactured it in volume as their first motorcar.

== Ceirano family background ==
The Ceirano brothers, Giovanni Battista, Giovanni, Ernesto and Matteo, were influential in the founding of the Italian auto industry, being variously responsible for: Ceirano; Welleyes (the technical basis of F.I.A.T.); Fratelli Ceirano; S.T.A.R. / Rapid (Società Torinese Automobili Rapid); SCAT (Società Ceirano Automobili Torino); Itala and S.P.A. (Società Piemontese Automobili). Giovanni's son Giovanni "Ernesto" was also influential, co-founding Ceirano Fabbrica Automobili (a.k.a. Giovanni Ceirano Fabbrica Automobili) and Fabrica Anonima Torinese Automobili (FATA).

In 1888, after eight years of apprenticeship at his father's watch-making business, Giovanni Battista started building Welleyes bicycles, so named because English names had more sales appeal. In October 1898 Giovanni Battista and Matteo co-founded Ceirano GB & C and started producing the Welleyes motor car in 1899. In July 1899 the plant and patents were sold to Giovanni Agnelli and produced as the first F.I.A.T.s - the Fiat 4 HP. Giovanni Battista was employed by Fiat as the agent for Italy, but within a year he left to found Fratelli Ceirano & C. which in 1903 became Società Torinese Automobili Rapid (S.T.A.R.) building cars badged as 'Rapid'. In 1904 Matteo Ceirano left Ceirano GB & C to create his own brand - Itala. In 1906 Matteo left Itala to found S.P.A. (Società Piemontese Automobili) with chief designer, Alberto Ballacco. In 1906 Giovanni founded SCAT (Società Ceirano Automobili Torino) in Turin. In 1919 Giovanni and Giovanni "Ernesto" co-founded Ceirano Fabbrica Automobili (a.k.a. Giovanni Ceirano Fabbrica Automobili) and in 1922 they took control of Fabrica Anonima Torinese Automobili (FATA).

== Early life ==
Born in Cuneo in 1860, Giovanni Battista was the eldest of four brothers born to Giovanni Ceirano, a watchmaker, and Teresa Corino. Aged twenty, devoured by the "sacred fire of mechanics", he left Cuneo for Turin to broaden his technical horizon, which was too limited at his father's small watchmaker workshop.

== Career ==
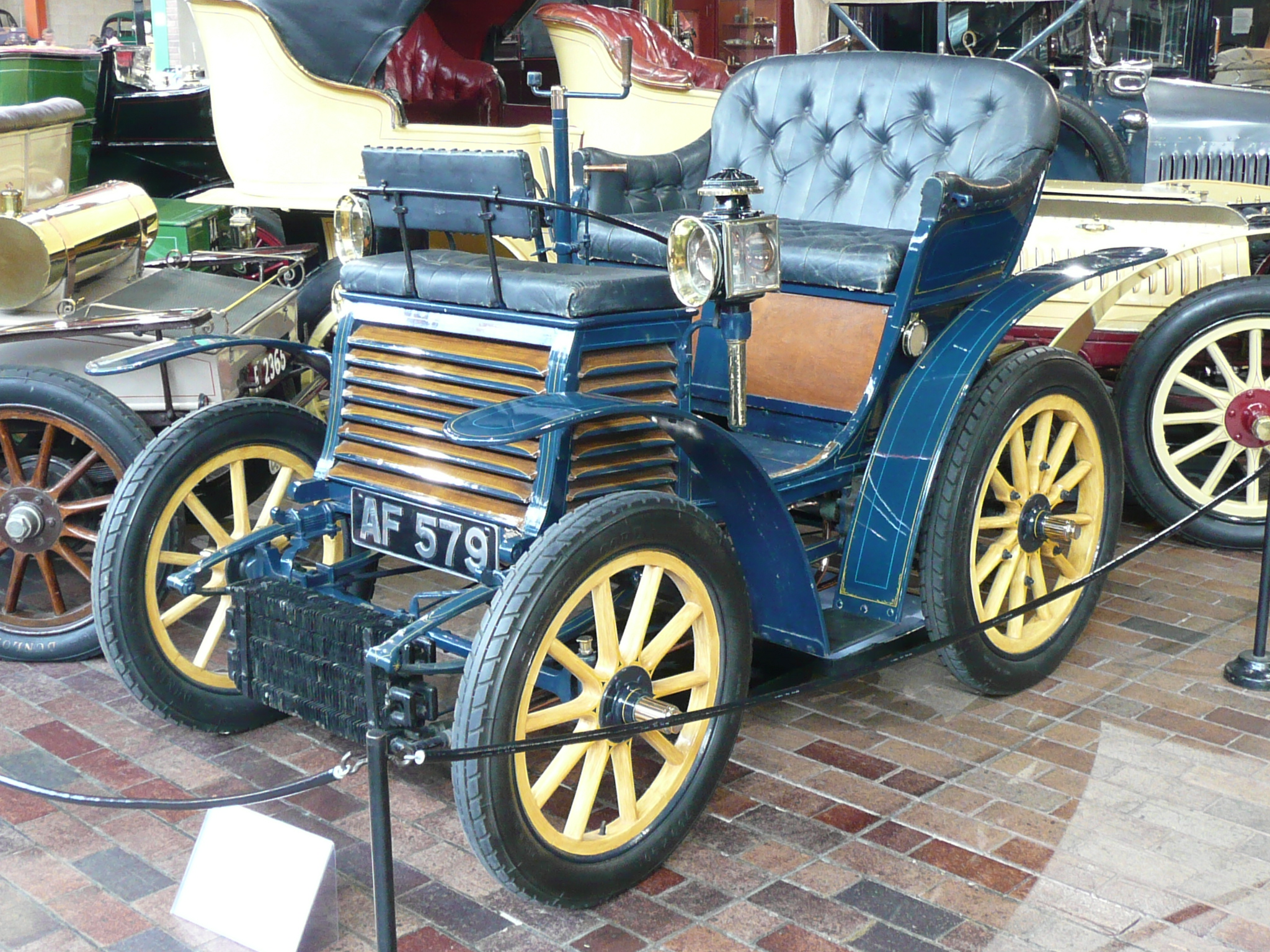
1899 F.I.A.T. 4hp

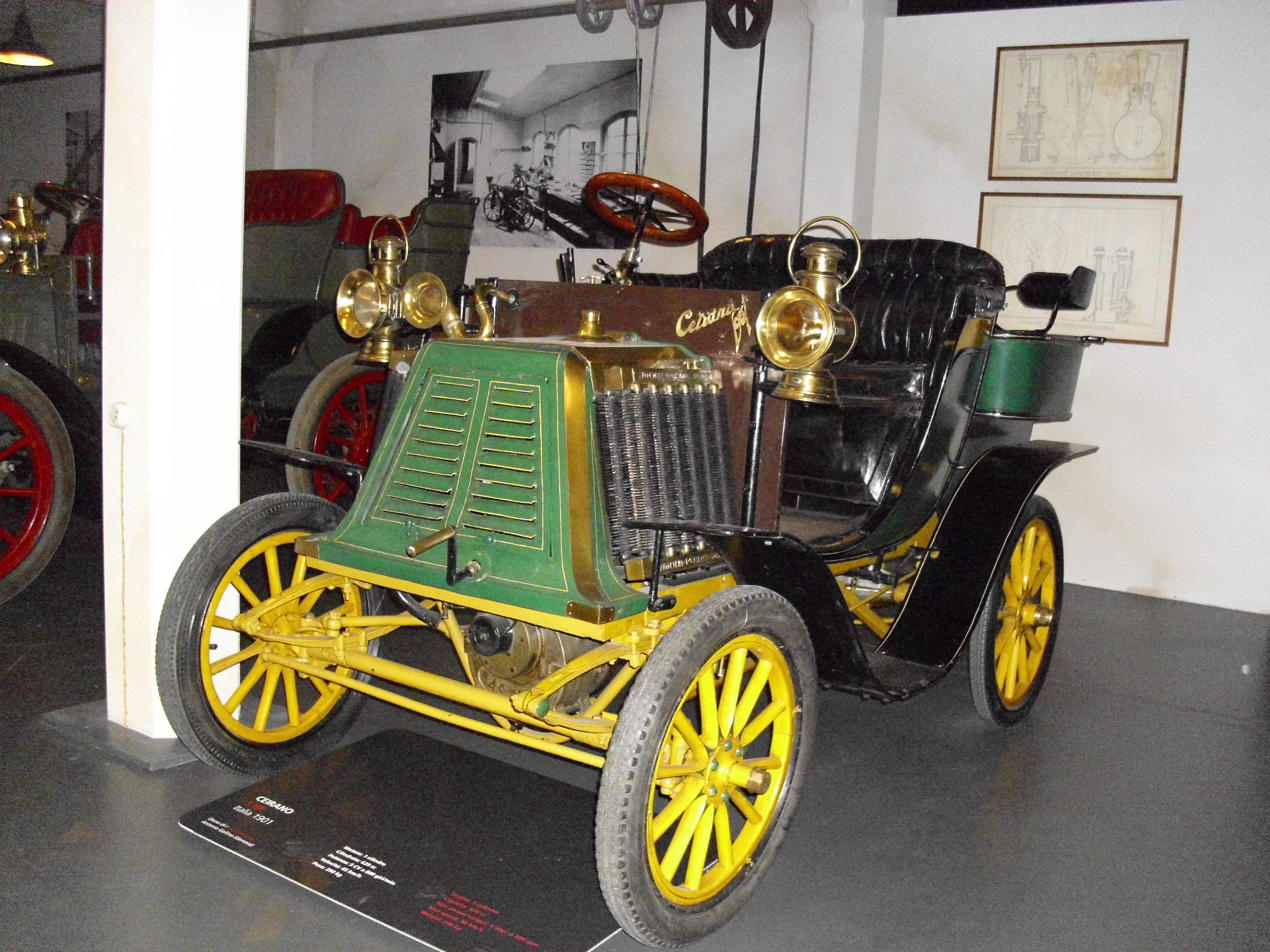
1901 Ceirano

In 1888, after eight years of "apprenticeship", he rented a storage space and started to build bicycles with his brothers Ernesto and Matteo. (Note: Some offline anglophone sources may describe John and Matthew) The bicycles were sold under the name of Welleyes, because at the time English names had more clout with the public.

At the end of 1898, the company Ceirano GB & C was founded with the intention of building cars. Among the workers was Vincenzo Lancia, who founded Lancia. The first car was designed by Aristide Faccioli. It was equipped with a small twin engine (663 cc) and a two-speed gearbox. This car was also named Welleyes and presented to the public in mid-1899.

Due to the success of this car, a small-series production was planned. This was impossible to implement in the cramped spaces of Ceirano GB & C.. For this reason, Ceirano contacted members of the aristocracy and finance in Turin in order to form a company that could build a factory. The preliminary agreement was reached on 1 July 1899, signed by a group of aristocrats. On 11 July 1899, Fabbrica Italiana Automobili Torino - F.I.A.T. was officially founded and the 'Welleyes' was launched as the F.I.A.T. 4hp.

When F.I.A.T. acquired "Ceirano GB & C." Giovanni Battista was paid for his shares and employed as a sales agent for Italy, but being an employee and representative was not in his nature so he left Fiat after only one year to found "Fratelli Ceirano" with his brother Matteo. In July 1903 'Fratelli Ceirano' became Società Torinese Automobili Rapid (S.T.A.R.) with the cars badged as 'Rapid'.

== Death ==
In 1905 he retired to Bordighera where he died in 1912.

== Bibliography ==
- Casamassima, Pino (2003). La Fiat e gli Agnelli: una storia italiana (in Italian). Le lettere. ISBN 978-88-7166-684-6.

== See also ==
- List of automobile companies founded by the Ceirano brothers
