= S.P.A. (automobile) =

Italian vehicle and aero-engine manufacturer

S.P.A. Società Piemontese Automobili
- Industry: Automotive
- Founded: 1906
- Defunct: 1926; 100 years ago
- Fate: Taken over by Fiat
- Headquarters: Turin, Italy
- Key people: Michele Ansaldi, Matteo Ceirano founders
- Products: Automobiles, military vehicles

S.P.A. (Società Piemontese Automobili) was an Italian automobile, military vehicle and aero-engine manufacturer founded in Turin by Matteo Ceirano and Michele Ansaldi. It was active between 1906 and 1926. In 1908, it merged with Fabbrica Ligure Automobili Genova (FLAG) and the new company, Società Ligure Piemontese Automobili, was headquartered in Genoa while manufacturing in Turin.

In 1923 it moved to Turin and in 1925 was taken over by Fiat, whereby car manufacture ceased but commercial and military vehicle production continued. Although car production resumed after World War II, by 1947 the company was fully absorbed into Fiat.

== Ceirano family background ==
The Ceirano brothers, Giovanni Battista, Giovanni, Ernesto and Matteo, were influential in the founding of the Italian auto industry, being variously responsible for : Ceirano; Welleyes (the technical basis of F.I.A.T.); Fratelli Ceirano; S.T.A.R./Rapid (Società Torinese Automobili Rapid); SCAT (Società Ceirano Automobili Torino); Itala and S.P.A. (Società Piemontese Automobili). Giovanni's son Giovanni "Ernesto" was also influential, co-founding Ceirano Fabbrica Automobili (aka Giovanni Ceirano Fabbrica Automobili) and Fabrica Anonima Torinese Automobili (FATA).

In 1888, after eight years apprenticeship at his father's watch-making business, Giovanni Battista started building Welleyes bicycles, so named because English names had more sales appeal. In October 1898 Giovanni Battista and Matteo co-founded Ceirano GB & C and started producing the Welleyes motor car in 1899. In July 1899 the plant and patents were sold to Giovanni Agnelli and produced as the first F.I.A.T.s - the Fiat 4 HP. Giovanni Battista was employed by Fiat as the agent for Italy, but within a year he left to found Fratelli Ceirano & C. which in 1903 became Società Torinese Automobili Rapid (S.T.A.R.) building cars badged as 'Rapid'. In 1904 Matteo Ceirano left Ceirano GB & C to create his own brand - Itala. In 1906 Matteo left Itala to found S.P.A. (Società Piemontese Automobili) with chief designer, Alberto Ballacco. In 1906 Giovanni founded SCAT (Società Ceirano Automobili Torino) in Turin. In 1919 Giovanni and Giovanni "Ernesto" co-founded Ceirano Fabbrica Automobili (aka Giovanni Ceirano Fabbrica Automobili) and in 1922 they took control of Fabrica Anonima Torinese Automobili (FATA).

== History ==
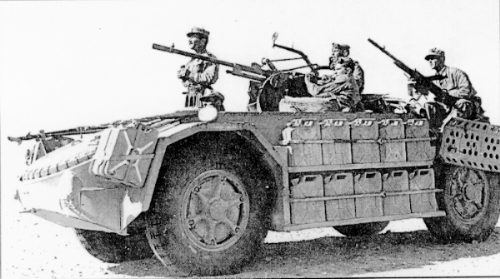
SPA-Viberti AS.42 in North Africa, March 1943, crewed by the PAI. It is part of the "103rd Compagnie Arditi Camionettisti", half of which fought on the Tunisian Front and the other half on the Libyan Front

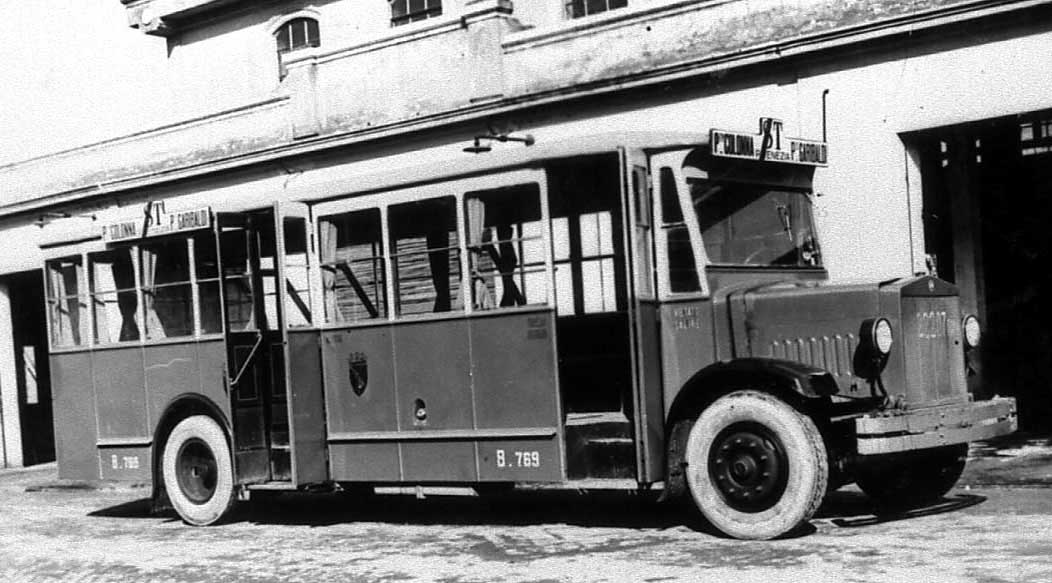
SPA bus model 34

The company was established in 1906 by Matteo Ceirano and Michele Ansaldi (founder of Ansaldi automobiles) in Turin under the name of Società Piemontese Automobili. The chief designer was Alberto Ballacco.

In 1908, the company merged with Fabbrica Ligure Automobili Genova (FLAG) and the new company became Società Ligure Piemontese Automobili. The headquarters was in Genoa while production continued in Turin.

During World War I the company produced aero engines such as the 6A. Shortly afterwards, in 1916, both Ceirano and Ansaldi left.

In 1923 the company moved to Turin. Severe financial problems lead to a take-over by Fiat in 1925 and the discontinuation of car manufacture in favor of commercial and military vehicles.

After World War II they resumed car production, but, in 1947, the company was fully absorbed into Fiat.

== Cars ==
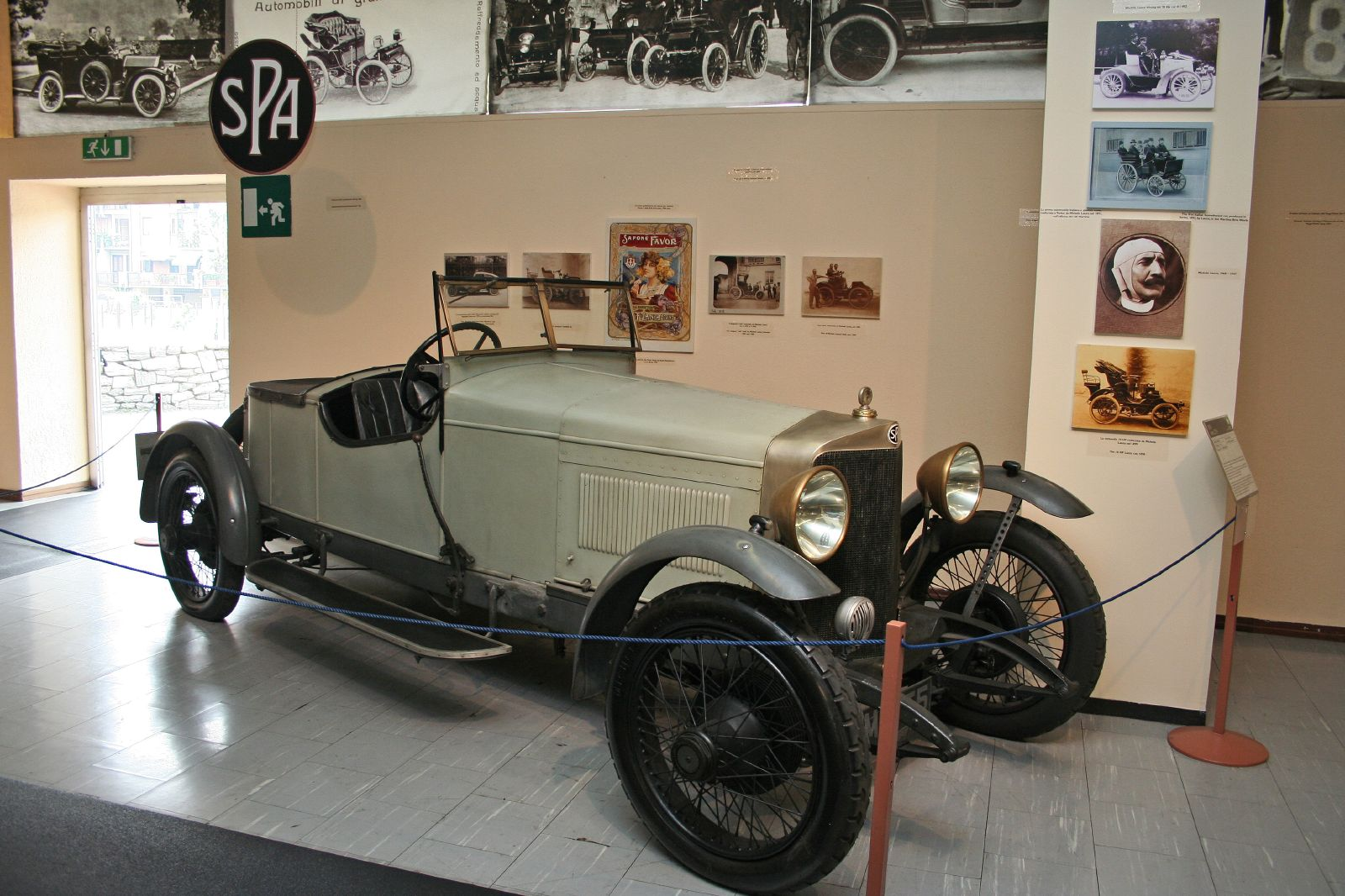
1922 SPA 23S at Museo dell'Automobile

The first S.P.A.s designed by Alberto Ballacco and Ceirano were the 28/40HP and 60/70 HP which had four cylinder engines, side valves and live rear axles. They were exhibited at the Esposizione di Torino.

By 1907 they also produced two six-cylinder models, one of which had the flywheel mounted at the front of the crankshaft.

By 1911 they had introduced L-head monobloc engine designs, unitary gearboxes, and High tension magneto ignition systems. In the year 1911, 250 automobiles and 100 trucks were produced. The next year they sold 500 cars and introduced a new four cylinder 14/16 hp engine as the basis of their modern, compact car.

By 1914 the range included twin, four and six cylinder cars - the biggest had an 11,536cc displacement.

After World War I production resumed with the pre-war models; the 14/16 HP using a 2.700cc side-valve engine and the '25/30 HP using a 4,400cc six cylinder engine.

In 1922 the highly sophisticated 30/40 Super Sports was launched, with a 4,400cc six cylinder engine, using twin overhead camshafts (dohc) operating four valves per cylinder. The aluminium alloy cylinders had steel liners and aluminium pistons, plus dual carburettors and dual-ignition. The car was also equipped with front-wheel brakes and a V-shaped radiator. By the next year, the sporting range was marketed as Tipo 23, Tipo 24 and Tipo 25.

== Racing ==
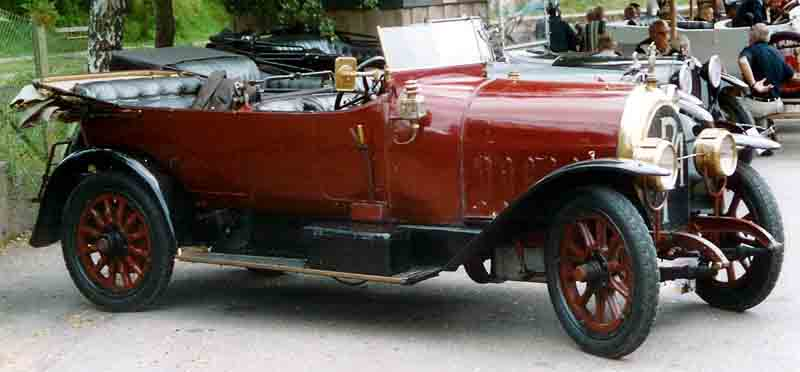
S.P.A. 50 HP 9000 1914

In 1908 Ernesto Ceirano finished third in the Targa Florio driving a four-cylinder, 7,785cc, S.P.A. 28/40 HP.

In 1909 an S.P.A. racer driven by Francesco Ciuppa won the Targa Florio race. Completing a single lap of the 148km Grande Circuit in 2 hours 43 minutes 19 seconds at an average speed of 54.67 km/h.

=== Range ===
- 28/40 HP
- 50 HP
- 60/70 HP
- 25/30 HP
- 14/16 HP
- Tipo 23
- Tipo 23 S
- Tipo 24
- Tipo 25

== Aero engines ==
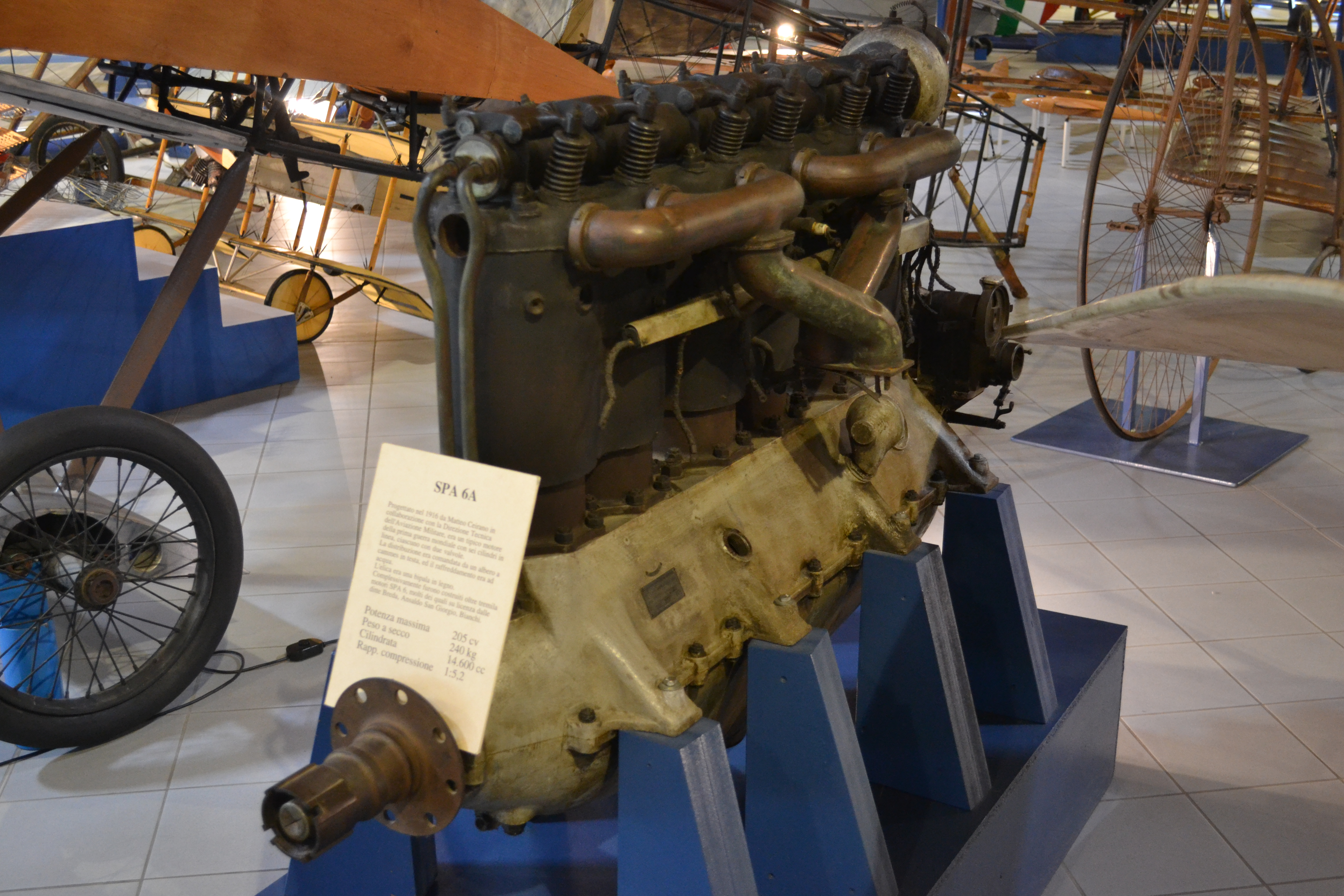
SPA 6A inline engine

During World War I the company also produced aero engines. The S.P.A. 6A was a water-cooled inline six-cylinder engine that produced 220 horsepower (164 kW).

The SPA 6A was used to power:

- Ansaldo A.1 Balilla - Italy's only domestically-produced fighter aircraft;
- Ansaldo SVA - reconnaissance biplane;
- Breda A.2 - a 1921 Italian sport and touring aircraft;
- Breda A.3;
- Breda A.9 and A.9bis - a 1928 Italian biplane trainer for the Regia Aeronautica;
- CANT 7 - a 1920 Italian Flying boat;
- Marchetti MVT/SIAI S.50 - a 1919-1920s Italian fighter aircraft.

== Military vehicles ==
- SPA 9000 da 102/35
- Dovunque 35
- Dovunque 35 protetto
- Dovunque 41
- 25C/10 (see Ursus A)
- 36R
- 38R
- S37
- AS37
- AS42
- AS43
- CL39
- TL37
- TM40
- A-10000

== See also ==
- List of Italian companies
- List of automobile companies founded by the Ceirano brothers
- Ursus A, a license-built Polish modification of SPA 25C
