= Matteo Ceirano =

Italian automotive engineer (1870–1941)

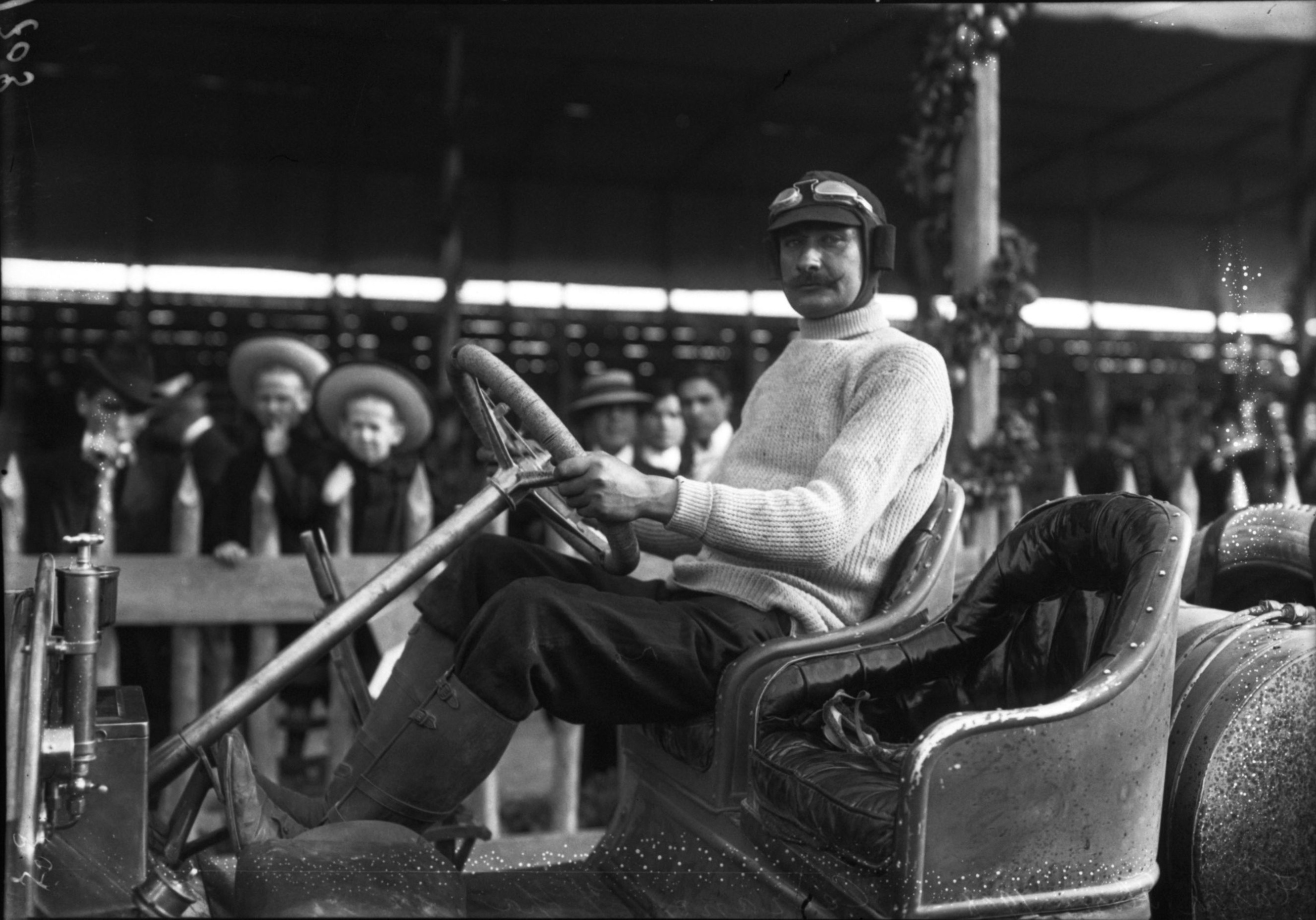
A picture of Matteo Ceirano

Matteo Ceirano (1870 – 19 March 1941) was an Italian automotive engineer and businessman in the early automobile industry. He co-founded the manufacturers Ceirano; Itala Fabbrica Automobili in 1904 and Società Piemontese Automobili (S.P.A.) in 1908.

== Life ==
Matteo Ceirano was born in 1870 in Cuneo. He was the youngest of four brothers born to Giovanni Ceirano, a watchmaker in Cuneo, and Teresa Corino.

He died on 19 March 1941 in Turin.

== Family background ==
The Ceirano brothers, Giovanni Battista, Giovanni, Ernesto and Matteo, were influential in the founding of the Italian auto industry, being variously responsible for : Ceirano; Welleyes (the technical basis of F.I.A.T.); Fratelli Ceirano; S.T.A.R. / Rapid (Società Torinese Automobili Rapid); SCAT (Società Ceirano Automobili Torino); Itala and S.P.A. (Società Piemontese Automobili). Giovanni's son Giovanni "Ernesto" was also influential, co-founding Ceirano Fabbrica Automobili (aka Giovanni Ceirano Fabbrica Automobili) and Fabrica Anonima Torinese Automobili (FATA).

In 1888, after eight years apprenticeship at his father's watch-making business, Giovanni Battista started building Welleyes bicycles, so named because English names had more sales appeal. In October 1898 Giovanni Battista and Matteo co-founded Ceirano GB & C and started producing the Welleyes motor car in 1899. In July 1899 the plant and patents were sold to Giovanni Agnelli and produced as the first F.I.A.T.s - the Fiat 4 HP. Giovanni Battista was employed by Fiat as the agent for Italy, but within a year he left to found Fratelli Ceirano & C. which in 1903 became Società Torinese Automobili Rapid (S.T.A.R.) building cars badged as 'Rapid'. In 1904 Matteo Ceirano left Ceirano GB & C to create his own brand - Itala. In 1906 Matteo left Itala to found S.P.A. (Società Piemontese Automobili) with chief designer, Alberto Ballacco. In 1906 Giovanni founded SCAT (Società Ceirano Automobili Torino) in Turin. In 1919 Giovanni and Giovanni "Ernesto" co-founded Ceirano Fabbrica Automobili (aka Giovanni Ceirano Fabbrica Automobili) and in 1922 they took control of Fabrica Anonima Torinese Automobili (FATA).

== See also ==
- Ceirano GB & C
- Itala, car manufacturer based in Turin from 1904 to 1934, started in 1903 by Matteo Ceirano and five partners
- List of automobile companies founded by the Ceirano brothers

== Notes ==
With Giovanni, he created the Ceirano Matteo & C. (1903), which became Ceirano Matteo & C. - Vetture Marca Itala (1904), which was renamed the Itala Fabrica Automobile manufacturing company later that same year. With Michele Ansaldi (the founder of Ansaldi automobiles) he established the Società Piemontese Automobili (1908), from which both retired in 1918.
