= Ceirano GB & C =

Historic automobile manufacturer

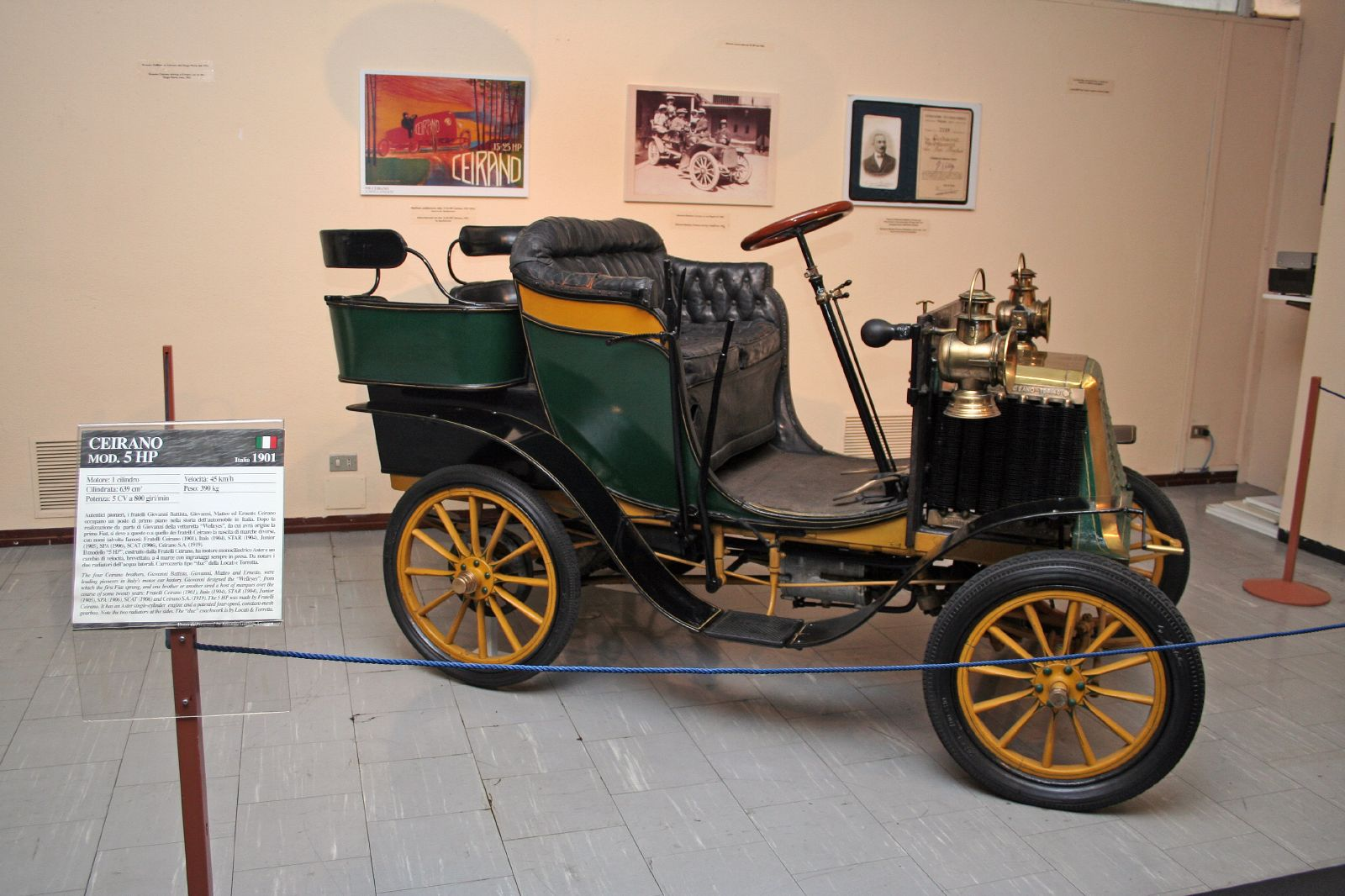
Ceirano 5 HP (1901)

Ceirano GB & C was a historic automobile company, founded in October 1888 by Giovanni Battista Ceirano, Emanuele di Bricherasio, Attilio Calligaris, Pietro Fenoglio and Cesare Goria Gatti.

The new company was based in Turin, where it began to build bicycles under the Welleyes brand name. In 1899, the company hired Aristide Faccioli to design a small car with two seats. Welleyes was a success for Ceirano, but they were unable to cope with volume production, so, in July 1899, Ceirano sold the company, plans and patents to Giovanni Agnelli, for launch as the first F.I.A.T. automobile.

== Ceirano family background ==
The Ceirano brothers, Giovanni Battista, Giovanni, Ernesto and Matteo, were influential in the founding of the Italian auto industry, being variously responsible for : Ceirano; Welleyes (the technical basis of F.I.A.T.); Fratelli Ceirano; S.T.A.R. / Rapid (Società Torinese Automobili Rapid); SCAT (Società Ceirano Automobili Torino); Itala and S.P.A. (Società Piemontese Automobili). Giovanni's son Giovanni "Ernesto" was also influential, co-founding Ceirano Fabbrica Automobili (a.k.a. Giovanni Ceirano Fabbrica Automobili) and Fabrica Anonima Torinese Automobili (FATA).

In 1888, after eight years apprenticeship at his father's watch-making business, Giovanni Battista started building Welleyes bicycles, so named because English names had more sales appeal. In October 1898, Giovanni Battista and Matteo co-founded Ceirano GB & C and started producing the Welleyes motor car in 1899. In July 1899, the plant and patents were sold to Giovanni Agnelli and produced as the first F.I.A.T.s - the Fiat 4 HP. Giovanni Battista was employed by Fiat as the agent for Italy, but within a year he left to found Fratelli Ceirano & C. which in 1903 became Società Torinese Automobili Rapid (S.T.A.R.) building cars badged as 'Rapid'. In 1904, Matteo Ceirano left Ceirano GB & C to create his own brand - Itala. In 1906, Matteo left Itala to found S.P.A. (Società Piemontese Automobili) with chief designer, Alberto Ballacco. In 1906, Giovanni founded SCAT (Società Ceirano Automobili Torino) in Turin. In 1919, Giovanni and Giovanni "Ernesto" co-founded Ceirano Fabbrica Automobili (a.k.a. Giovanni Ceirano Fabbrica Automobili), and in 1922, they took control of Fabrica Anonima Torinese Automobili (FATA).

== The car ==
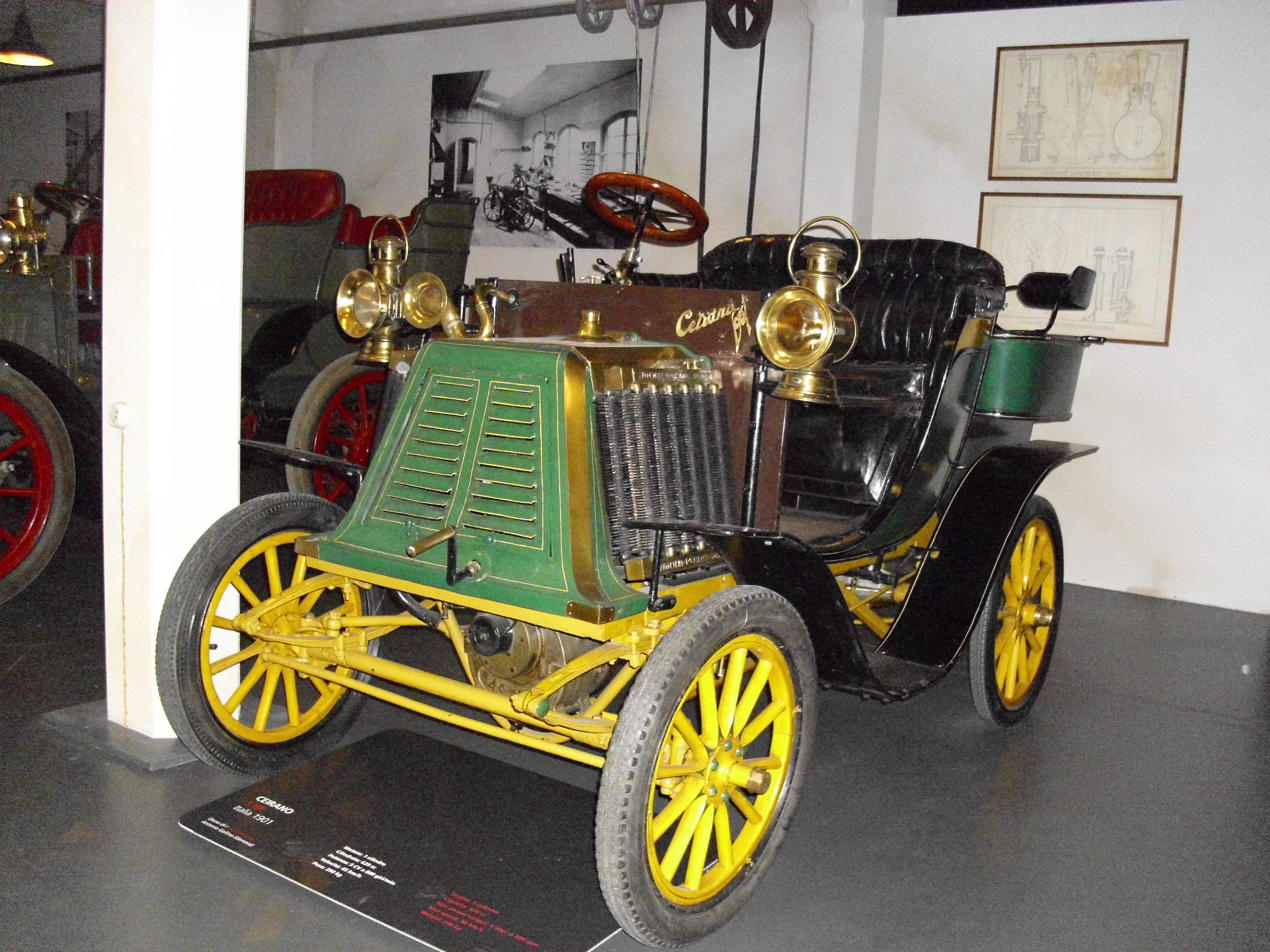
Ceirano 1901

The Welleyes was presented on 30 April 1899, and was designed by Aristide Faccioli, one of the most brilliant car engineers at the time. The car was equipped with two horizontal cylinders, transmission with leather belt and with two gears. The first Fiat made car FIAT 3 ½ HP was a direct derivative of this model.

== See also ==
- List of automobile companies founded by the Ceirano brothers
