= Ernesto Ceirano =

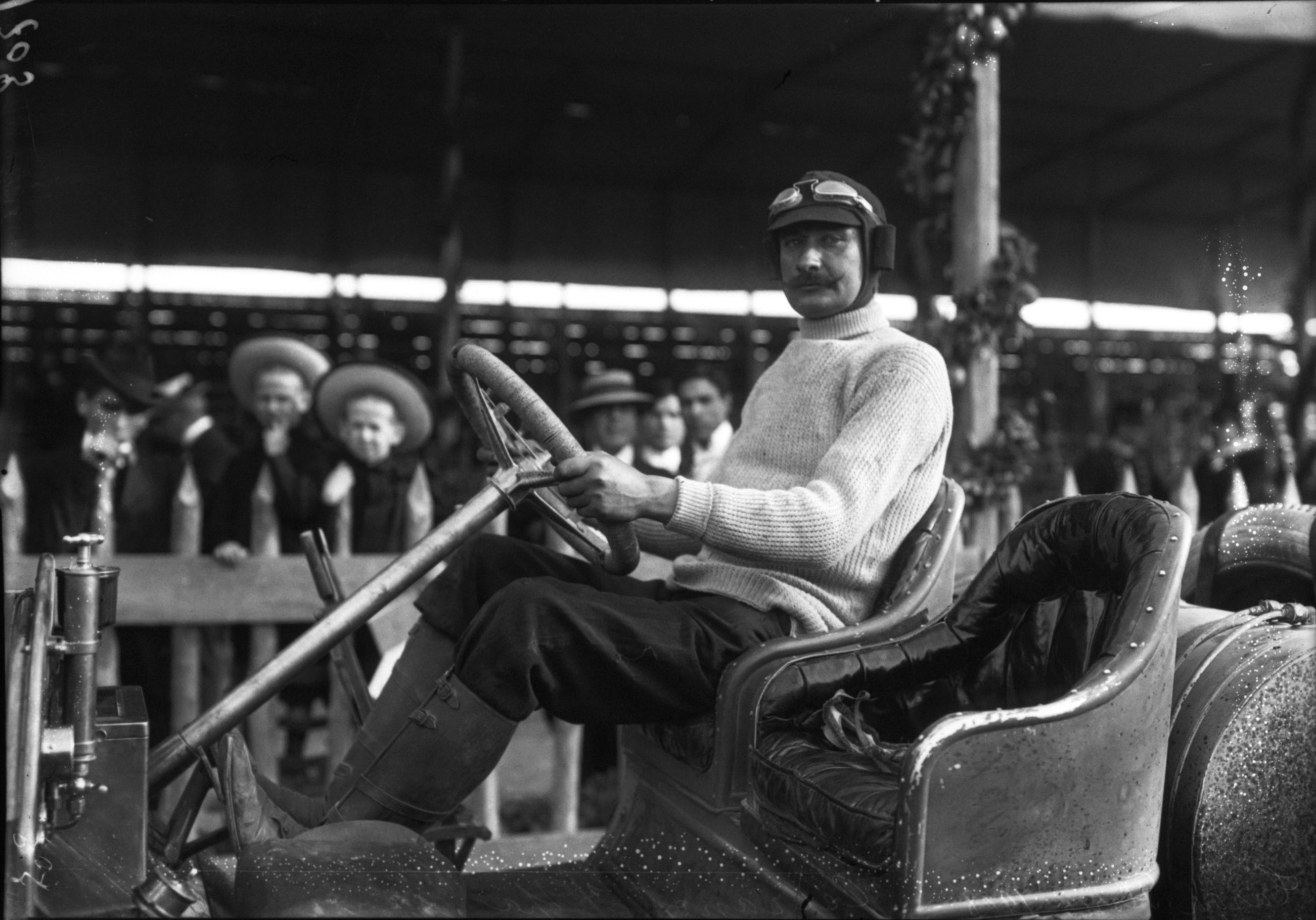
3rd TARGA FLORIO on 18 May 1908. Ernesto Ceirano in S.P.A.

Ernesto Ceirano (1875–1953) was an Italian entrepreneur, racing driver and motoring pioneer. Born in Cuneo in 1875, Ceirano was the youngest of four brothers who were pioneers of the Italian car industry. In 1908 he finished third in the Targa Florio driving his brother's S.P.A. (Società Piemontese Automobili) automobile.

== Ceirano family background ==
The Ceirano brothers, Giovanni Battista, Giovanni, Ernesto and Matteo, were influential in the founding of the Italian auto industry, being variously responsible for : Ceirano; Welleyes (the technical basis of F.I.A.T.); Fratelli Ceirano; S.T.A.R. / Rapid (Società Torinese Automobili Rapid); SCAT (Società Ceirano Automobili Torino); Itala and S.P.A. (Società Piemontese Automobili). Giovanni's son Giovanni "Ernesto" was also influential, co-founding Ceirano Fabbrica Automobili (a.k.a. Giovanni Ceirano Fabbrica Automobili) and Fabrica Anonima Torinese Automobili (FATA).

In 1888, after eight years apprenticeship at his father's watch-making business, Giovanni Battista started building Welleyes bicycles, so named because English names had more sales appeal. In October 1898 Giovanni Battista and Matteo co-founded Ceirano GB & C and started producing the Welleyes motor car in 1899. In July 1899 the plant and patents were sold to Giovanni Agnelli and produced as the first F.I.A.T.s - the Fiat 4 HP. Giovanni Battista was employed by Fiat as the agent for Italy, but within a year he left to found Fratelli Ceirano & C. which in 1903 became Società Torinese Automobili Rapid (S.T.A.R.) building cars badged as 'Rapid'. In 1904 Matteo Ceirano left Ceirano GB & C to create his own brand - Itala . In 1906 Matteo left Itala to found S.P.A. (Società Piemontese Automobili) with chief designer, Alberto Ballacco. In 1906 Giovanni founded SCAT (Società Ceirano Automobili Torino) in Turin. In 1919 Giovanni and Giovanni "Ernesto" co-founded Ceirano Fabbrica Automobili (a.k.a. Giovanni Ceirano Fabbrica Automobili) and in 1922 they took control of Fabrica Anonima Torinese Automobili (FATA).

== Early life ==
Ernesto was the third of four brothers born to Giovanni Ceirano, a watchmaker in Cuneo, and Teresa Corino. Ernesto gained his initial knowledge and skills working as an automotive mechanic alongside his brothers.

== Career ==
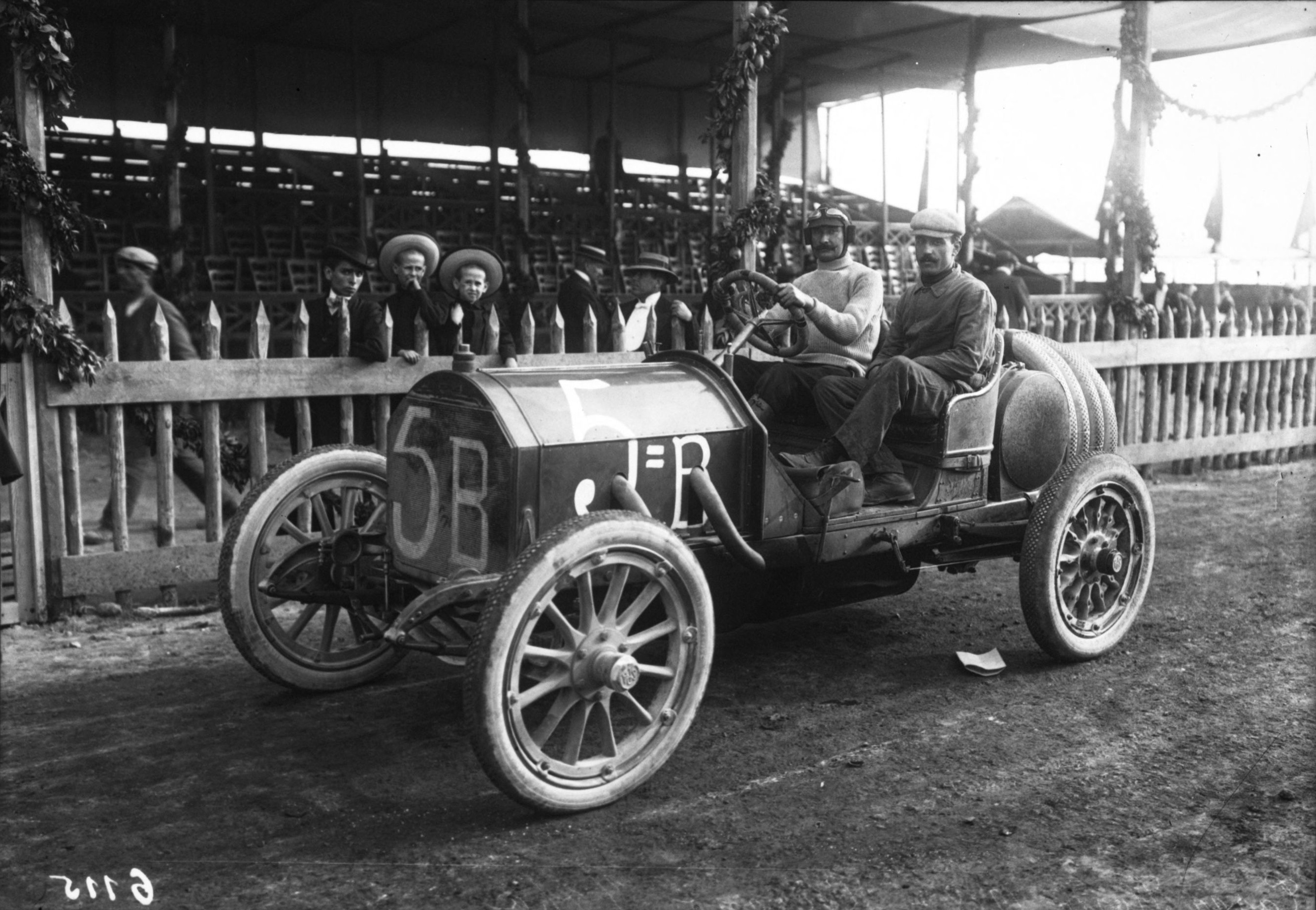
Targa Florio 1908, Ernesto Ceirano in S.P.A. 18 May 1908.

Ernesto, who had good knowledge of engine design, made his name primarily as a race car driver.

In 1908 he finished third in the Targa Florio driving Matteo's four-cylinder, 7,785cc, S.P.A. 28/40 HP.

He won the 1911 Targa Florio in a SCAT with Alfred Momo as driving mechanic.

Ernesto may have been the 'Capo del montaggio' (production manager) at SCAT. (Note: There is some lack of clarity among sources and translations because Giovanni Ceirano's son 'Giovanni junior' was nicknamed "Ernesto".)

== See also ==
- Ceirano GB & C
- Itala, car manufacturer based in Turin from 1904 to 1934, started in 1903 by Matteo Ceirano and five partners
- List of automobile companies founded by the Ceirano brothers
