= List of automobile companies founded by the Ceirano brothers =

Automobile companies founded by and associated with the Ceirano brothers, Giovanni Battista Ceirano, Giovanni Ceirano, Matteo Ceirano and Ernesto Ceirano and their descendants.

Year	Name	Founder	Description	Marque
1898	Ceirano & C.	Giovanni Battista Ceirano	Welleyes (the technical basis of F.I.A.T.). The first motorcar Ceirano designed and built was the Well-Eyes. He sold the rights to Giovanni Agnelli of F.I.A.T. who manufactured it in volume as their first motor car.	Ceirano
1901	Fratelli Ceirano & C.	Giovanni Battista Ceirano & Matteo Ceirano		Ceirano
1904	Società Torinese Automobili Rapid	Giovanni Battista Ceirano		Rapid
1904	Itala Fabbrica Automobili	Matteo Ceirano		Itala
1905	Junior F.J.T.A. Fabbrica Junior Torinese d'Automobili	Giovanni Ceirano		Junior
1906	Società Piemontese Automobili	Matteo Ceirano		SPA
1906	Società Ceirano Automobili Torino	Giovanni Ceirano		SCAT
1917	Ceirano Fabbrica Automobili	Giovanni Ceirano & Giovanni "Ernesto" Ceirano		Ceirano
1923	SCAT-Ceirano	Giovanni Ceirano		Ceirano
1920	Societa Italiana Ferrotaie (Turin 1920-1922); Fabbrica Anonima Torinese Automobili (Turin 1922-1933)	Secondary involvement by Giovanni Ceirano & Giovanni "Ernesto" Ceirano		Aurea

== See also ==
- List of Italian companies
