= Itala (company) =

Car manufacturer based in Turin, Italy

- Industry: Automotive
- Founded: 1904
- Defunct: 1934, re-established as brand in 2026
- Fate: Ceased production, remnants sold to Fiat
- Headquarters: Turin, Italy
- Key people: Matteo Ceirano, founder
- Products: Automobiles

Itala was a car manufacturer based in Turin, Italy, from 1904 to 1934, started by Matteo Ceirano and five partners in 1903. The name was revived in 2026 by DR Automobiles.

== Ceirano family background ==
The Ceirano brothers, Giovanni Battista, Giovanni, Ernesto and Matteo, were influential in the founding of the Italian auto industry, being variously responsible for: Ceirano; Welleyes (the technical basis of F.I.A.T.); Fratelli Ceirano; S.T.A.R. / Rapid (Società Torinese Automobili Rapid); SCAT (Società Ceirano Automobili Torino); Itala and S.P.A. (Società Piemontese Automobili). Giovanni's son Giovanni "Ernesto" was also influential, co-founding Ceirano Fabbrica Automobili (aka Giovanni Ceirano Fabbrica Automobili) and Fabrica Anonima Torinese Automobili (FATA).

In 1888, after eight years apprenticeship at his father's watch-making business, Giovanni Battista started building Welleyes bicycles, so named because English names had more sales appeal. In October 1898 Giovanni Battista and Matteo co-founded Ceirano GB & C and started producing the Welleyes motor car in 1899. In July 1899 the plant and patents were sold to Giovanni Agnelli and produced as the first F.I.A.T.s - the Fiat 4 HP. Giovanni Battista was employed by Fiat as the agent for Italy, but within a year he left to found Fratelli Ceirano & C., which in 1903 became Società Torinese Automobili Rapid (S.T.A.R.), building cars badged as 'Rapid'. In 1904 Matteo Ceirano left Ceirano GB & C to create his own brand – Itala. In 1906 Matteo left Itala to found S.P.A. (Società Piemontese Automobili) with chief designer, Alberto Ballacco. In 1906 Giovanni founded SCAT (Società Ceirano Automobili Torino) in Turin. In 1919 Giovanni and Giovanni "Ernesto" co-founded Ceirano Fabbrica Automobili (aka Giovanni Ceirano Fabbrica Automobili) and in 1922 they took control of Fabrica Anonima Torinese Automobili (FATA).

== History ==
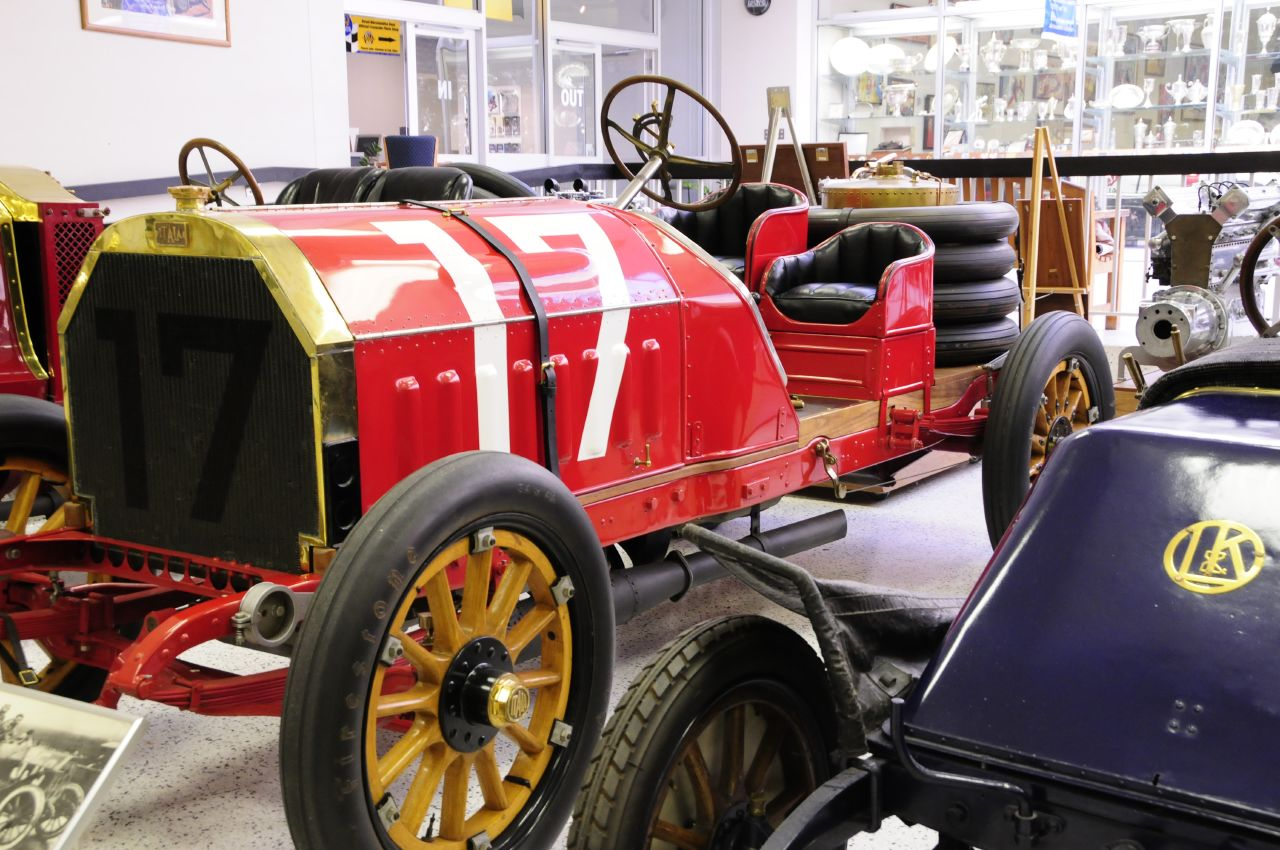
1907 Itala Grand Prix Racer with a 14.75-liter (900 cubic inches) straight-four engine

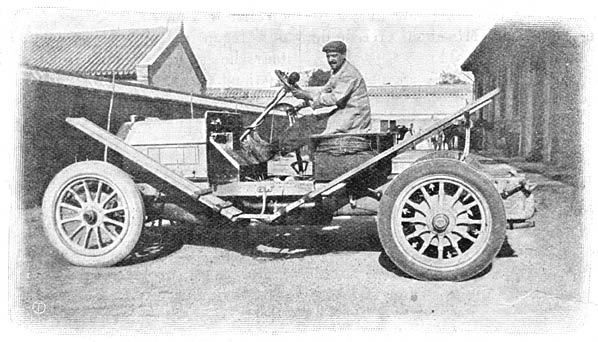
The 1907 Itala mod. 35/45 HP which won the Peking to Paris motor race in 1907

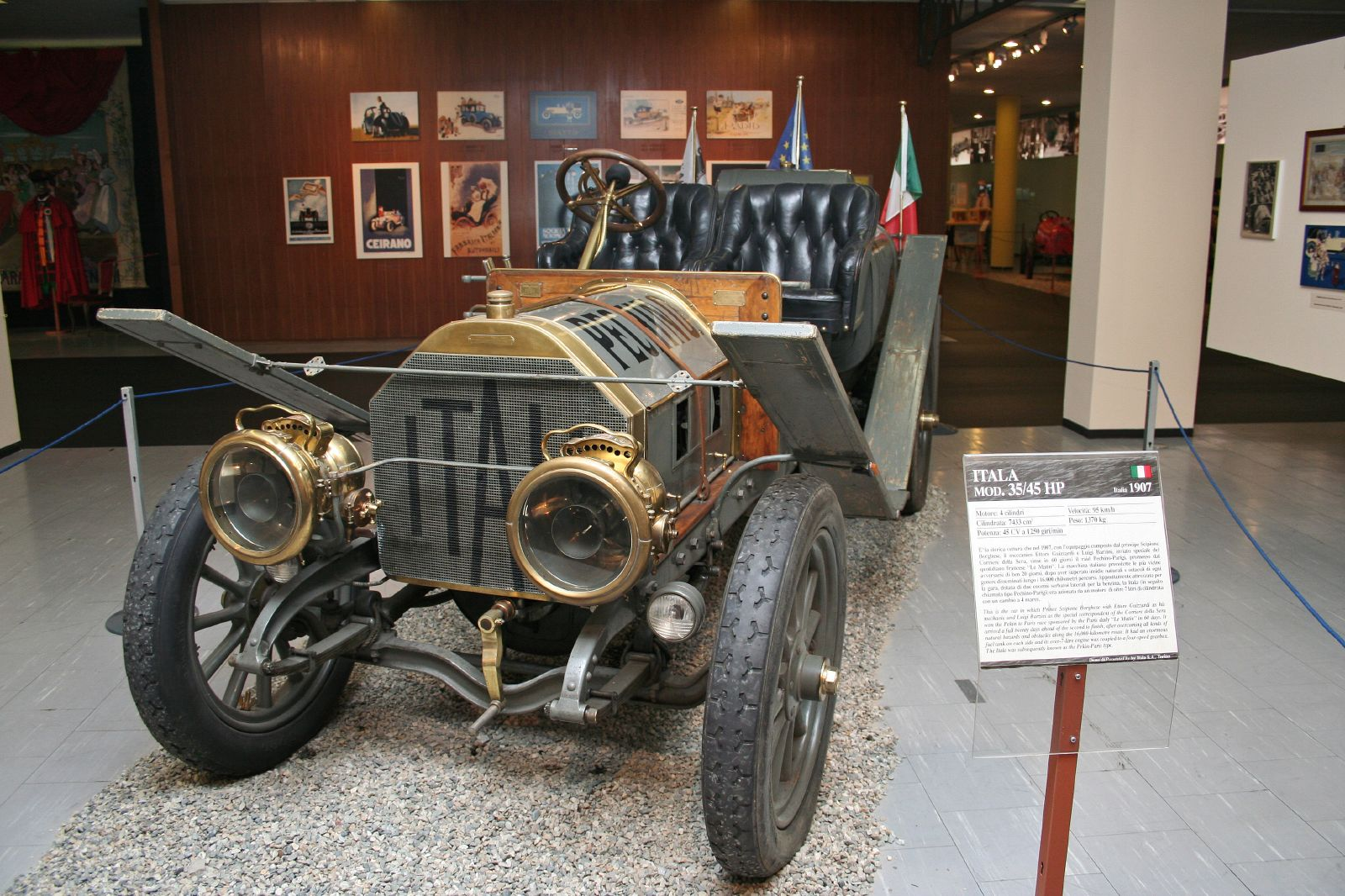
The Itala mod. 35/45 HP at the Museo Nazionale dell'Automobile in Turin

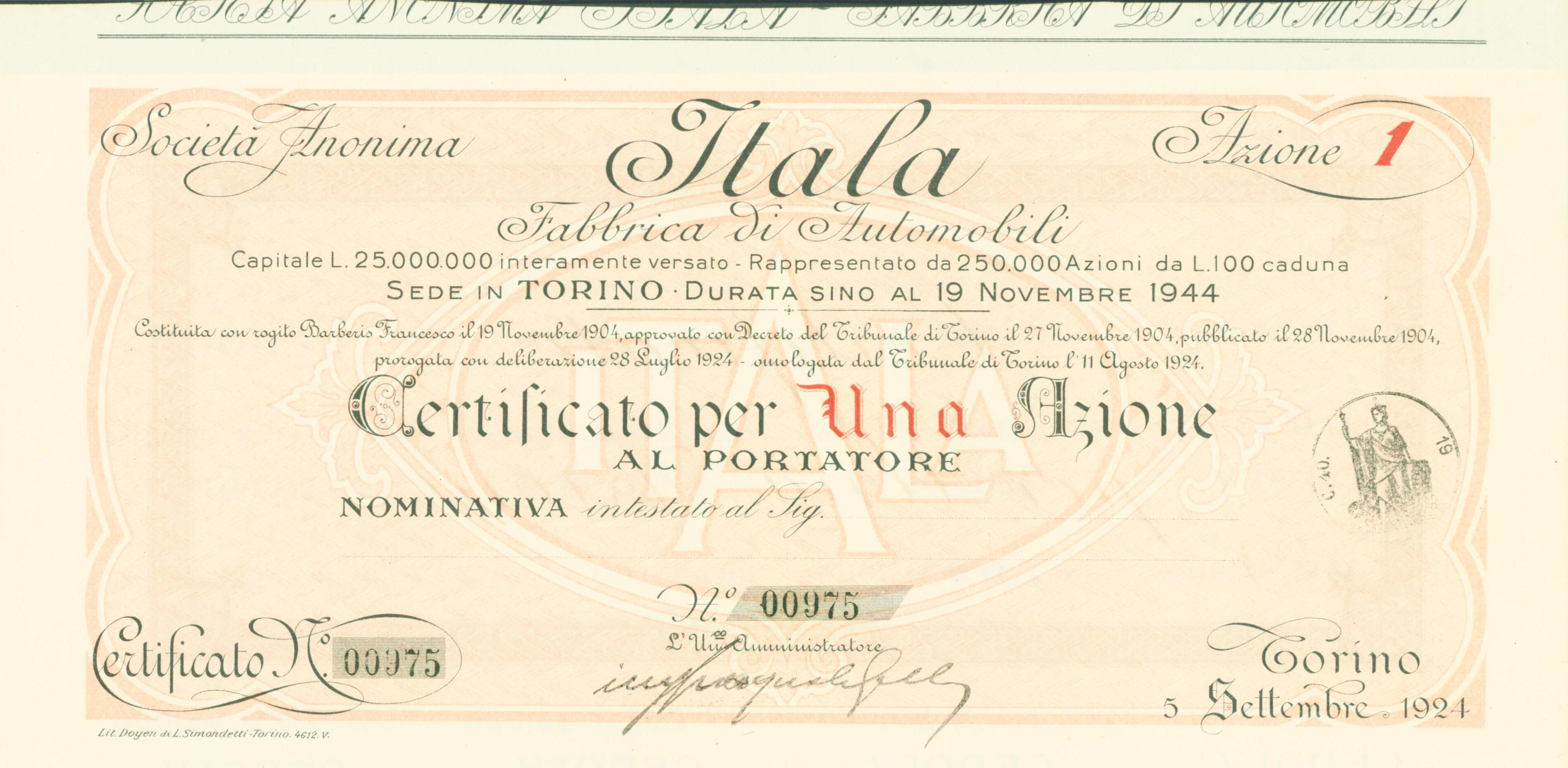
Share of the Itala Fabbrica di Automobili, issued 5 September 1924

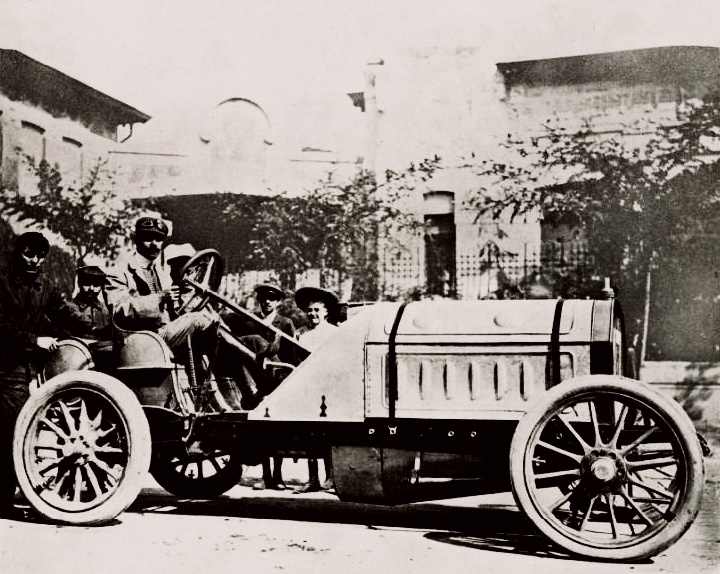
Itala 112 HP driven by Giovanni Battista Raggio during Coppa Florio in 1905

Three cars were offered in the first year, an 18 hp, a 24 hp and a 50 hp. In 1905 they started making very large-engined racing cars with a 14.8-litre 5-cylinder model which won the Coppa Florio and the year after that the Targa Florio. In 1907 a 7,433 cc (453.6 cu in) 35/45 hp model driven by Count Scipione Borghese, 10th Prince of Sulmona who won the Peking to Paris motor race by three weeks. These sporting successes helped sales dramatically; the company continued to grow. In the year 1911, 650 automobiles and 50 trucks were produced. The company experimented with a range of novel engines such as variable-stroke, sleeve-valve, and "Avalve" rotary types and at the beginning of World War I, offered a wide range of cars. During the war, Itala built aeroplane engines but made a loss producing them.

After the armistice, car production resumed with models based on the pre-war cars such as the Tipo 50 25/35 hp and a re-appearance of the Avalve in the 4,426 cc (270.1 cu in) Tipo 55, but financial success eluded the company.

From 1924 the company was being run under receivership, and they appointed Giulio Cesare Cappa from Fiat as general manager. He produced a new car, the Tipo 61 with 6-cylinder alloy engine, which was well received, but he then decided to return to motor sport producing in 1925 the Itala mod. 11, a very advanced single seat racing car with a 1050 cc supercharged V12 engine that developed 60 CV at 7,000 rpm. It had front-wheel drive and all-round independent suspension, with a top speed of around 150 km/h (93 mph), but the car never raced. Two Tipo 61s did take part in the 1928 Le Mans 24 hour race, winning the 2-litre class.

The company was bought by truck maker Officine Metallurgiche di Tortona in 1929, and a few more cars were made up to 1935. The remains of the company were sold to Fiat.

== Itala rotary valves ==
A distinctive feature of the pre-World War I 50 hp and 90 hp models was their use of a rotary valve. Each valve fed a pair of cylinders and was mounted alongside, rotating parallel to them. Four ports cast into the valve alternately connected ports to the cylinders through the side of the valve to the inlet and exhaust manifolds at bottom and top of the valves.

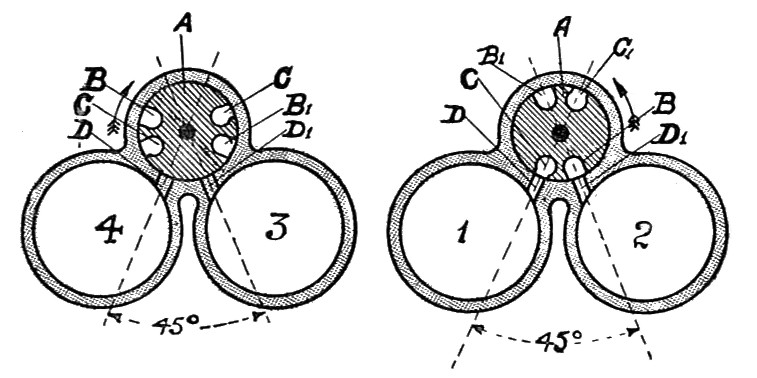
Valve and cylinders from above

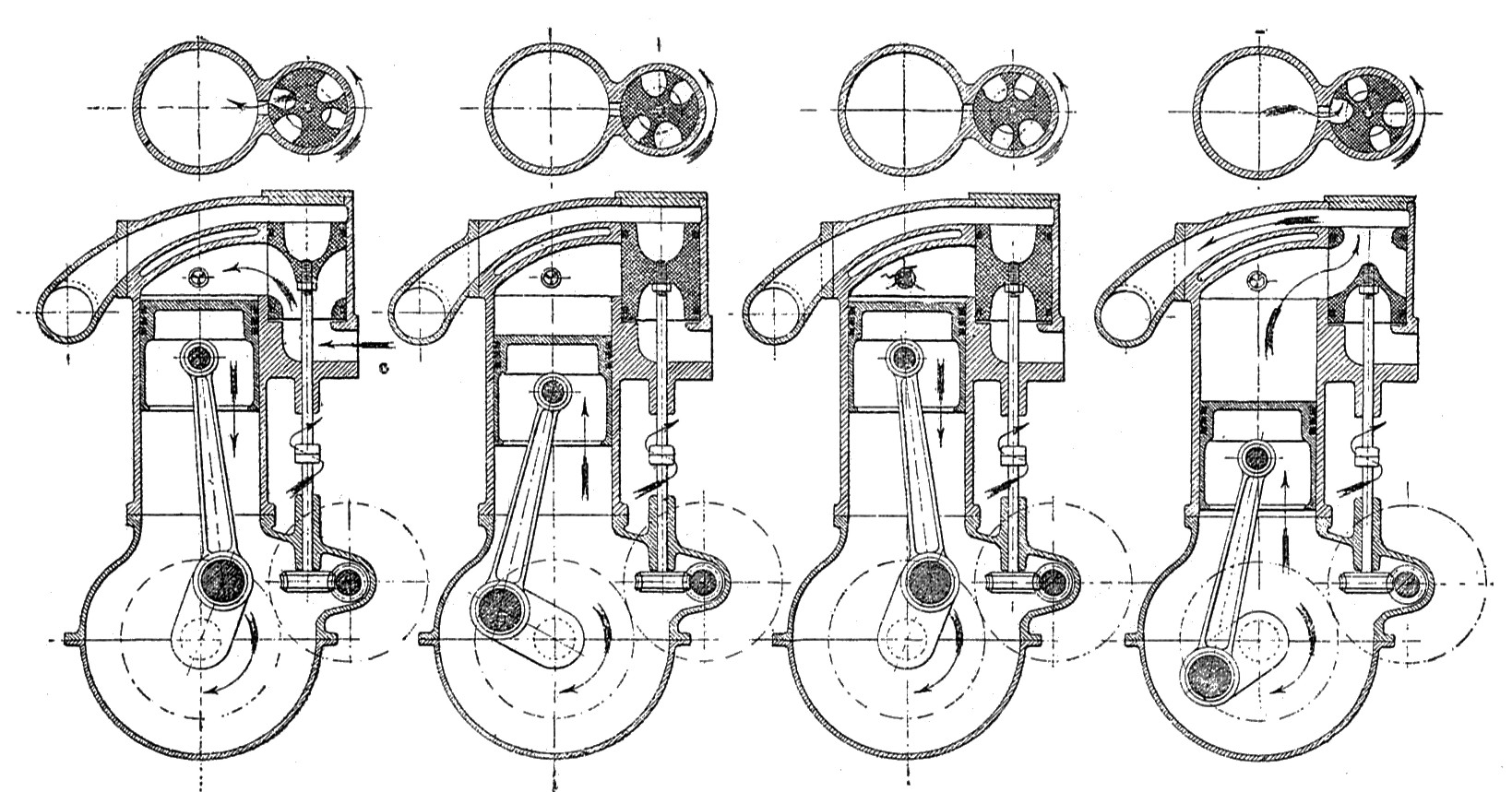
Engine stroke and valve position

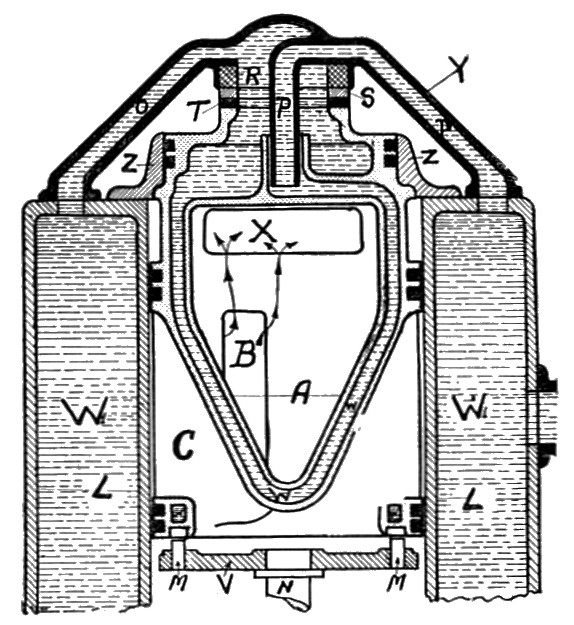
Internal water-cooling of the valve

Leo Villa began his career as a racing mechanic working on these rotary valve engines for the driver Giulio Foresti. He met Malcolm Campbell, when in 1923, Campbell took over the Itala and Ballot concessions in London. Seeing the publicity potential of racing them at Brooklands, Campbell also bought two of Foresti's race-prepared cars. Foresti and Villa delivered them in person from Paris to Campbell's house at Povey Cross. Impressed by Campbell's wealth and ambitions, Villa accepted an offer to become his permanent mechanic.

== Itala brand (2026) ==
In 2025, the rights to the Itala brand were purchased by DR Automobiles. Later, in 2026, the re-founded brand revealed the Itala 35, a model based on the GAC Trumpchi GS3 and styled by Italdesign.

== Bibliography ==
- Barzini, Luigi and L P De Castelvecchio. Peking to Paris 100th Anniversary Edition. Demontreville Press Inc, 2007.ISBN 0978956311
- Clutton, Cecil (1967). The 1907 & 1908 Racing Italas. Profile Publications. 61.

== See also ==
- List of Italian companies
- List of automobile companies founded by the Ceirano brothers
