= Fiat 4 HP =

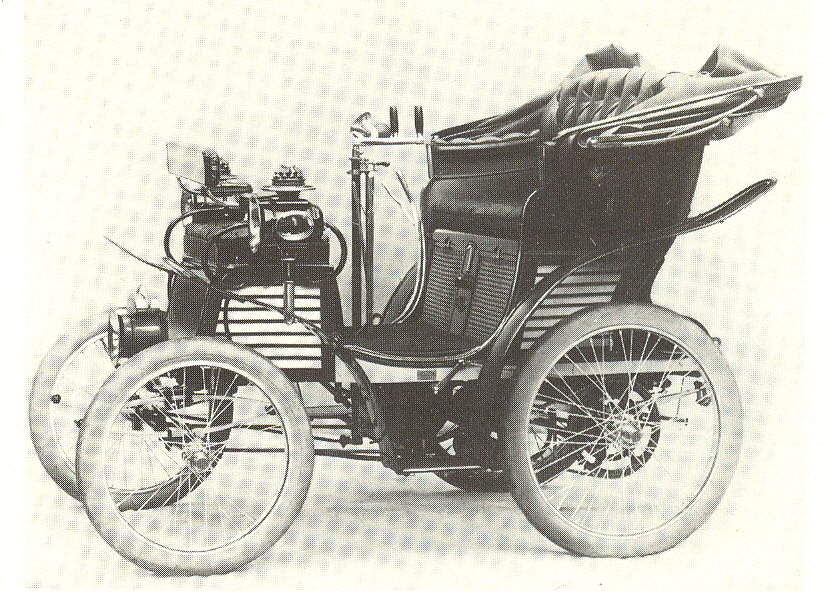

Overview
- Manufacturer: Fiat
- Also called: Fiat 3 ½ HP; Fiat 3 ½ CV
- Production: 1899–1900; 24 produced
- Assembly: Corso Dante plant, Turin, Italy
- Designer: Aristide Faccioli

Body and chassis
- Body style: vis à vis
- Layout: RR layout
- Related: Ceirano 5 HP

Powertrain
- Engine: straight-2 679 cc
- Transmission: 3-speed manual

Dimensions
- Wheelbase: 1,470 mm (58 in)
- Length: 2,300 mm (91 in)
- Width: 1,420 mm (56 in)
- Height: 1,450 mm (57 in)
- Curb weight: 680 kg (1,499 lb)

Chronology
- Successor: Fiat 6 HP

The Fiat 4 HP (also known as the 3½ HP or 3½ CV) was the first model of car produced by FIAT, from 1899 to 1900 based on a third party design.

== Background ==
The 4 HP is related to the Ceirano brothers—Giovanni, Ernesto and Matteo—who were an influential force in kick-starting the Italian automotive industry. In fact, they are variously responsible for creating companies including Ceirano GB & C, Itala, SCAT (Società Ceirano Automobili Torino) and SPA (Società Piemontese Automobili).

== Design ==
In 1888, after eight years apprenticeship at his father's watch-making business, Giovanni Ceirano started building Welleyes bicycles, so named because English names had more sales appeal in Italy. In October 1898, Giovanni then co-founded Ceirano GB & C and started producing the Welleyes motor car in 1899. Its coachwork was by Marcello Alessio.

In July 1899, the Welleyes' plant and patents were sold to Giovanni Agnelli who then produced the 4 HP, which became the first ever FIAT. The car had a water-cooled 0.7-liter (679 cc) 2-cylinder, rear-mounted engine producing 4.2 horsepower at 800 rpm, coupled with a three-speed gearbox without reversing gear. Its top speed was 35 kilometres per hour (22 mph). and it had a fuel consumption of 8 litres per 100 kilometres (35 mpg_{‑imp}; 29 mpg_{‑US}).

Giovanni Ceirano was employed by FIAT as the agent for Italy, however, within a year he left to establish "F.lli Ceirano", which became STAR (Società Torinese Rapid Cars). In 1904, Matteo Ceirano left Ceirano GB & C to establish Itala, to then leave in 1906 and also establish SPA (Società Piemontese Automobili) with chief designer, Alberto Ballacco. That same year, Giovanni Ceirano founded SCAT (Società Ceirano Automobili Torino).

== Production ==
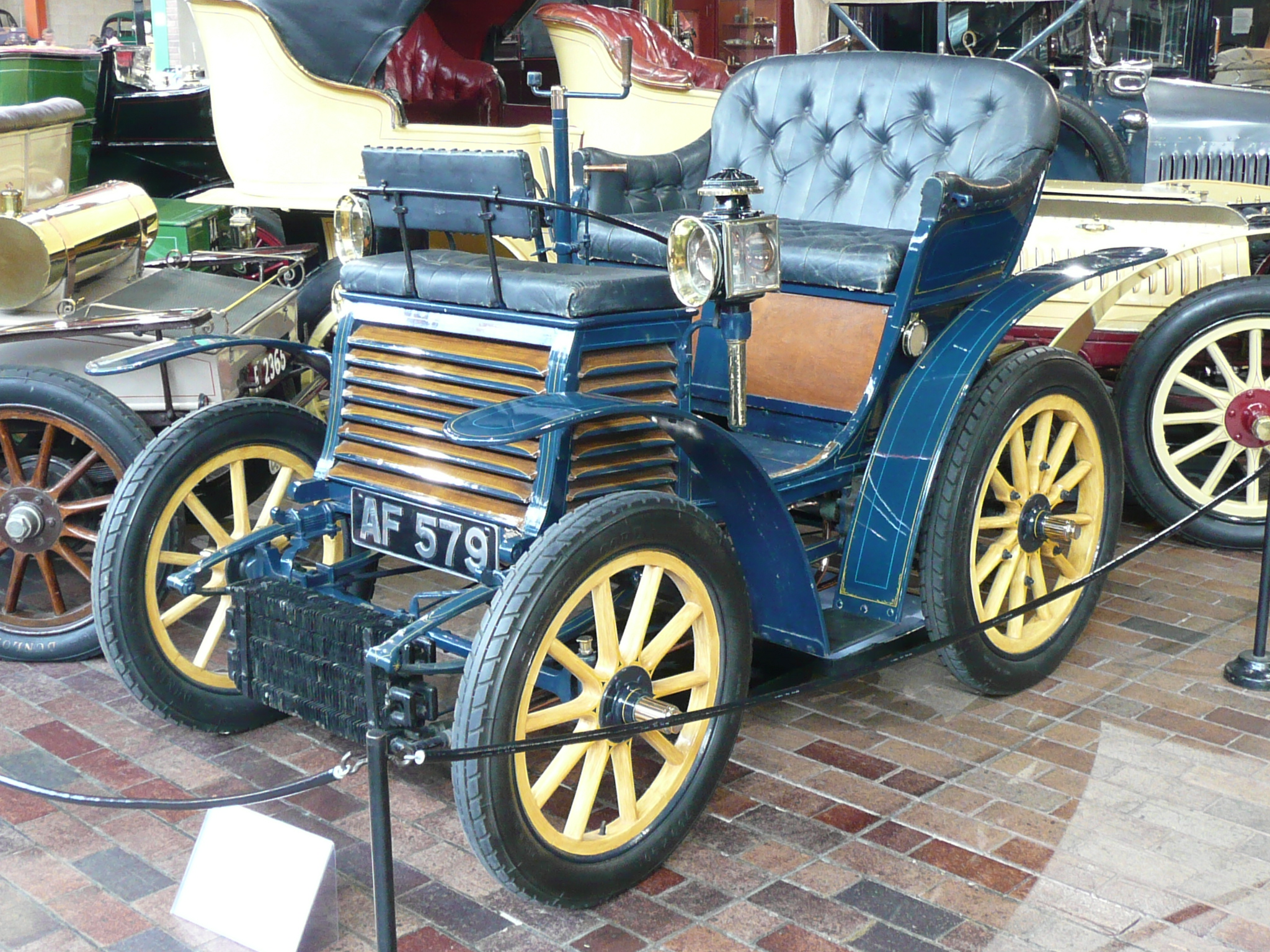
The FIAT 4 HP at the UK National Motor Museum

In total, FIAT produced 24 units (8 of which were in the first year).

Today, at least four of these first Fiats are in existence:

- two in Italy at the Automobile Museum of Turin and the Centro Storico Fiat, respectively
- one in the United Kingdom at the National Motor Museum
- one in the United States at the Ford Museum in Dearborn, Michigan.
