= Aurea (car) =

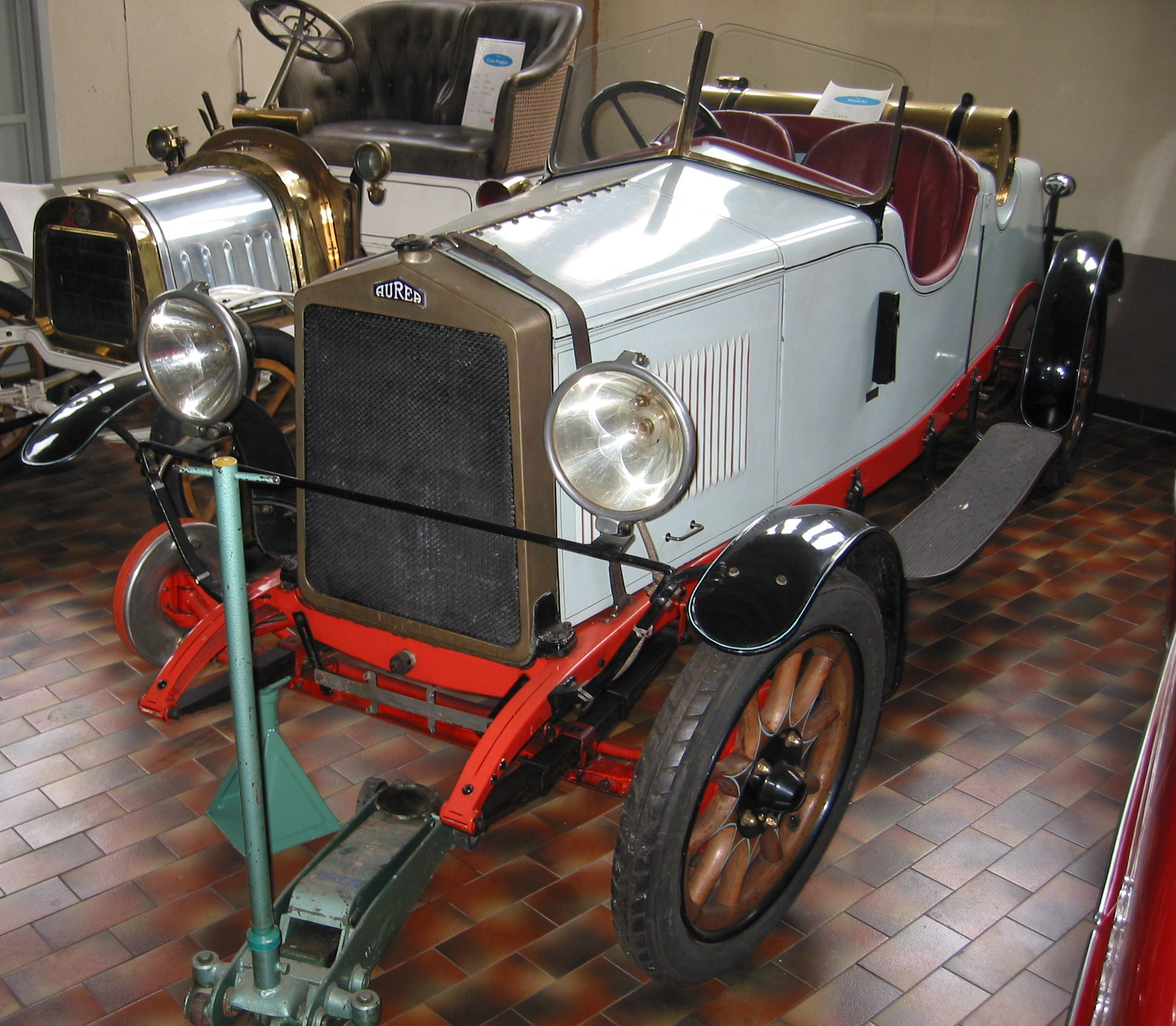
1925 Aurea

Aurea, Societa Italiana Ferrotaie (Turin 1920-1922), Fabbrica Anonima Torinese Automobili (Turin 1922-1933). Aurea was an Italian automobile manufactured in Turin from 1921 to 1930.

== History ==
Aurea built sidevalve and overhead valve four-cylinder cars with engines that started at 1460 cc in the S.V. version engine, but later were increased to 1479 cc in both S.V. and O.H.V. engine configurations. Only the "S" type MONZA factory racing version contained the overhead valve engine type engine. The cars were well-made, but fairly heavy. Regular production of Aureas stopped around 1926, but the company produced a few more cars from existing parts and maintained parts supply under for the vehicles under Ceirano's new ownership and management from late 1926 onwards. After the last Aurea vehicle assembly, the same factory was used to manufacture Ceirano commercial vehicles, particularly trucks.

== See also ==
- List of automobile companies founded by the Ceirano brothers
