= Cyril Snipe =

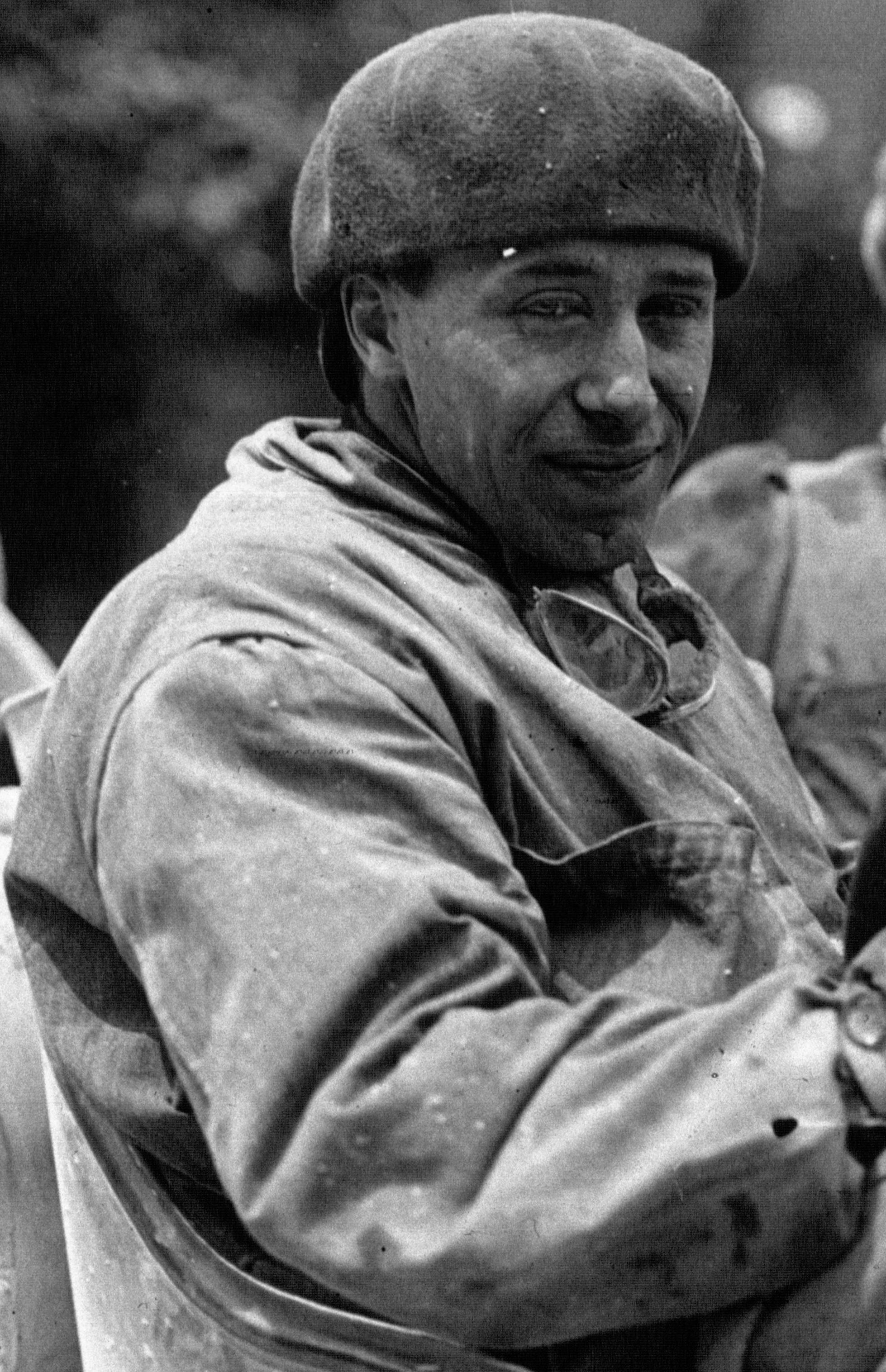
Cyril Snipe in 1912

Cyril Snipe (1888-1944) was a British motor racing driver who won the 1912 Targa Florio in Sicily driving an Italian SCAT motor car.

== Early life ==
Cyril Arthur Snipe was born at Conisborough, Yorkshire, in the first quarter of 1888 to Arthur W Snipe, a schoolmaster, and Fanny (née Banner). By the time of the 1901 census the family were living in Tamworth, Staffordshire. Snipe was the nephew of a Manchester car dealer, John Bennett of Newton-Bennett, who backed his early racing career.

== Motoring career ==
Newton and Bennett was an associate company of SCAT (Società Ceirano Automobili Torino), an automobile manufacturer from Turin, Italy, that was founded in 1906 by Giovanni Ceirano. Snipe reportedly worked at the Turin factory as a test driver.

In 1910 he achieved a class victory in the Modena sprint driving an (Società Piemontese Automobili) S.P.A., manufactured in Turin by Matteo Ceirano.

=== Targa Florio ===
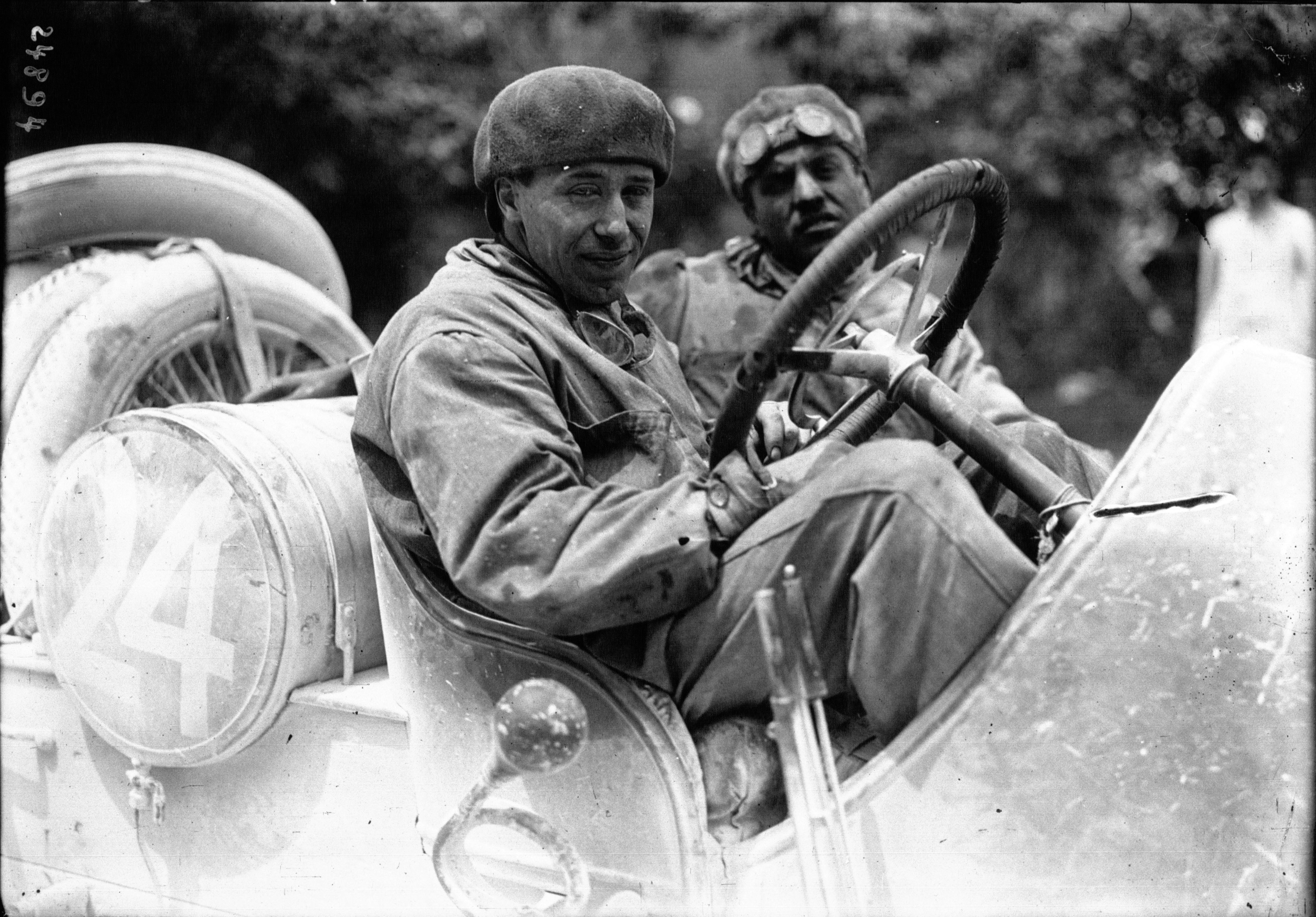
Snipe in his SCAT at the 1912 Targa Florio

Snipe won the Targa Florio (Giro di Sicilia) on 25 and 26 May 1912 when, driving a SCAT 25/35 with his co-driver Pedrini, they completed the 965 kilometre course around the island of Sicily in 24 hours 37 minutes 39 seconds. Snipe defeated a field of 26 cars, including Lancia, Isotta-Fraschini, Fiat and Alfa. The race passed through Palermo; Messina; Catania; Syracuse; Ragusa; Gela; Agrigento; Marsala; Trapani; and back to Palermo.

Snipe drove a SCAT again in the 1913 Targa Florio race but failed to finish.

In 1919 the British manufacture Eric-Campbell entered two cars in the tenth Targa Florio held on 23 November and comprising 4 laps of the 108 kilometre Madonie circuit. The drivers were Snipe and Jack Scales who would subsequently race for the Italian marque Chiribiri. l'Inglese Scalese (The Englishman Scales) in car number 23 retired after 1 lap due to a broken steering arm, whilst Snipe did not complete a single lap in car number 24.

== Family life ==
In 1911 Snipe married Blanche L Blainey in Salford, Greater Manchester but she died in 1918 in Portsmouth aged 28. Thus in 1922 he married Emily Hendrey (or Moreton) in Paddington.

His death was registered in Surrey in 1944 at the age of 55.
