= Targa Florio =

Open road endurance automobile race

Coordinates: 37°56′52″N 13°47′10″E

- Category: Endurance
- Country: Tour of Island of Sicily, Italy
- Inaugural season: 1906
- Folded: 1977
- Last Drivers' champion: (Italy) Raffaele Restivo (Italy) Alfonso Merendino
- Last Constructors' champion: (United Kingdom) Chevron
- Official website: www.targa-florio.it

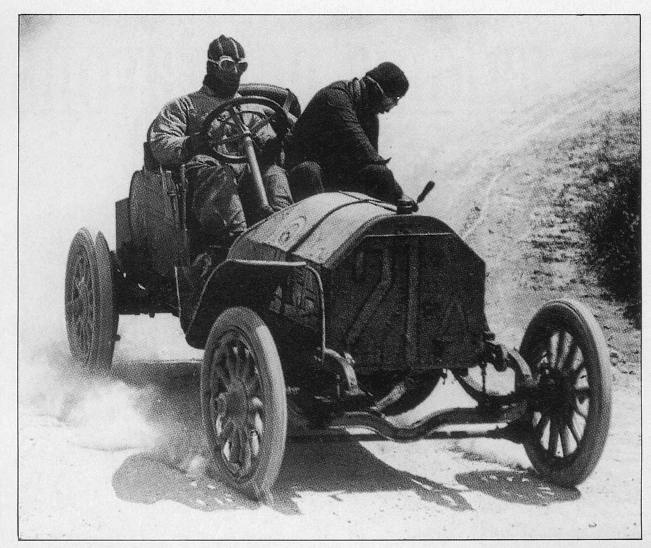
Alessandro Cagno (1883–1971), winner of first Targa Florio in 1906. Pictured at 1907 event.

The Targa Florio was a public road endurance automobile race held in the mountains of Sicily near the island's capital of Palermo. Founded in 1906, it was the oldest sports car racing event and was part of the World Sportscar Championship between 1955 and 1973. While the first races consisted of a whole tour of the island, the track length in the race's last decades was limited to the 72 km (45 mi) of the Circuito Piccolo delle Madonie, which was lapped 11 times.

After 1973, it was a national sports car event until it was discontinued in 1977 due to safety concerns. It has since been run as Targa Florio Rally, a rallying event, and is part of the Italian Rally Championship.

== History ==
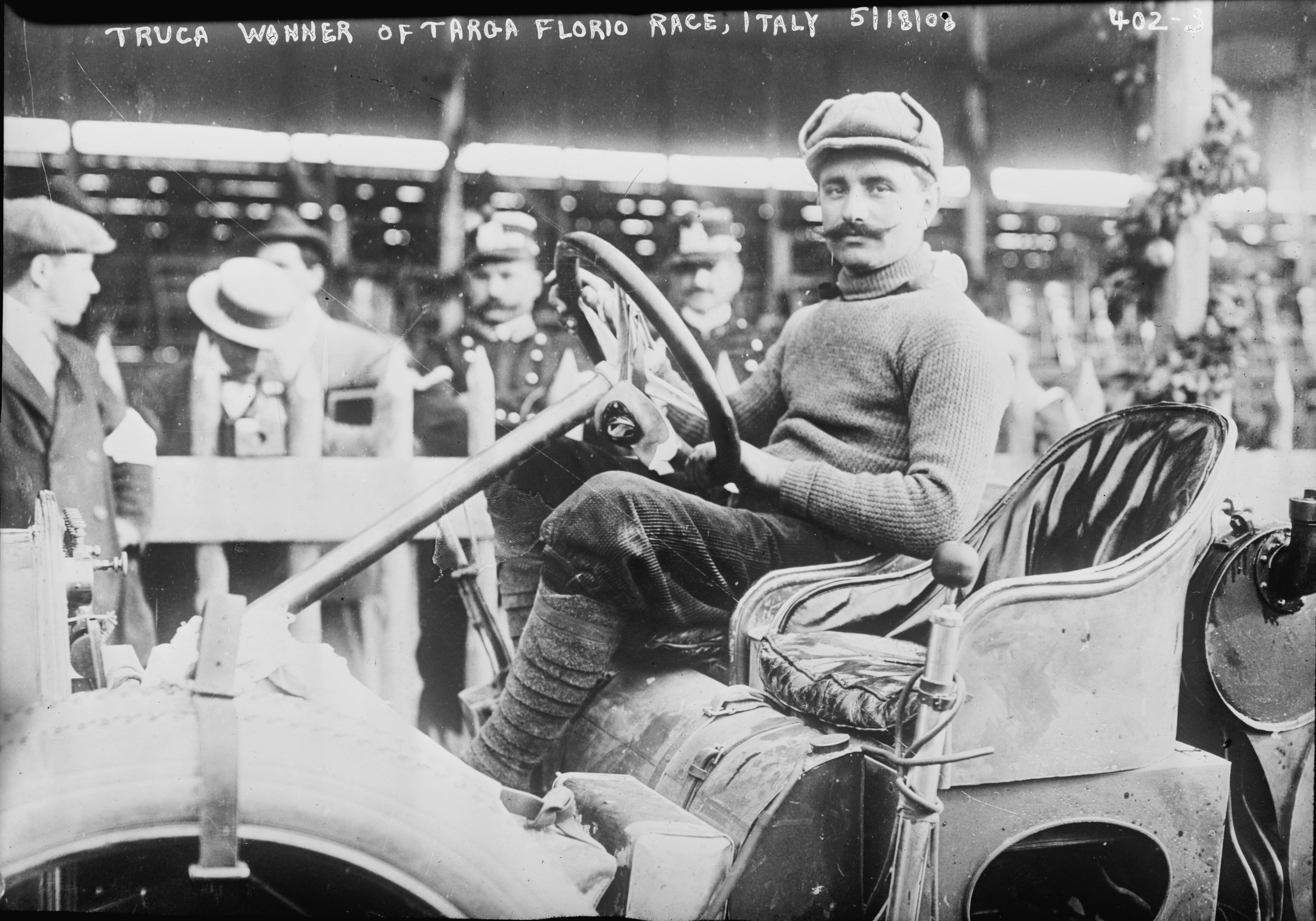
Vincenzo Trucco, driving an Isotta Fraschini, was the winner of the 1908 Targa Florio.

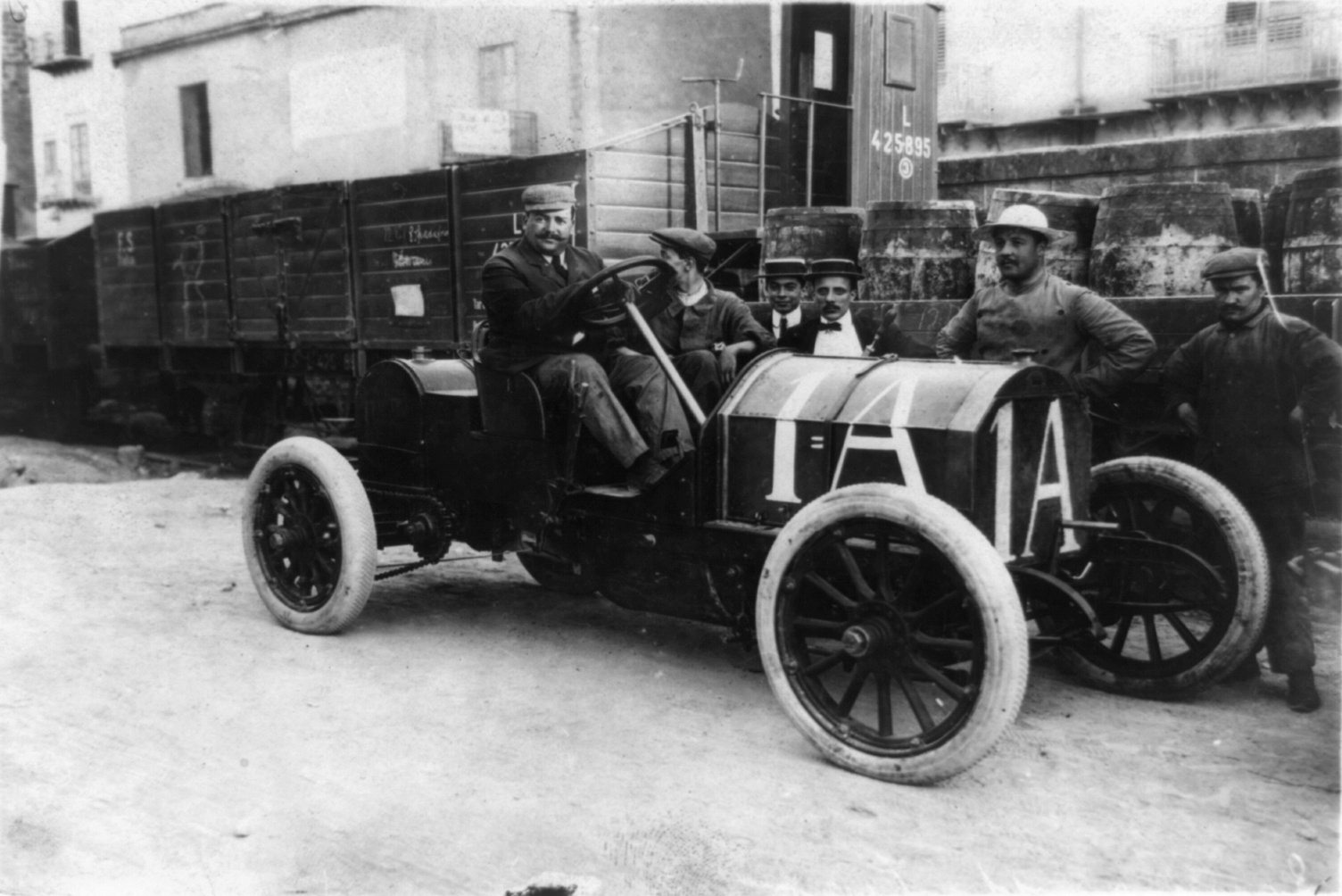
Vincenzo Lancia, driving a Fiat 50 HP, finished second.

The race was created in 1906 by the wealthy pioneer race driver and automobile enthusiast, Vincenzo Florio, who had started the Coppa Florio race in Brescia, Lombardy in 1900. The Targa also claimed to be a world event not to be missed. Renowned artists, such as Alexandre Charpentier and Leonardo Bistolfi, were commissioned to design medals. A magazine was initiated, Rapiditas, which aimed to enhance, with graphic and photographic reproductions of the race, the myth of the car and the typical character of modern life, speed.

One of the toughest competitions in Europe, the first Targa Florio covered 3 laps of a 92-mile (148 km) circuit, totaling 276 miles (444 km), traversing through winding bends and multiple hairpin curves on treacherous mountain roads, with around 2,000 corners per lap and over 3,600 feet (1,100 m) of elevation change, at heights where severe changes in climate frequently occurred. Alessandro Cagno won the inaugural 1906 race in nine hours, averaging 30 miles per hour (50 km/h).

By 1919, the Targa Florio course had been shortened to 67 miles (108 km) and had become one of Europe's most important races, as neither the 24 Hours of Le Mans nor the Mille Miglia had been established yet. Grand Prix races were still isolated events, not a series like today's F1.

The wins of Mercedes (not yet merged with Benz) in the 1920s made a big impression in Germany, especially that of German Christian Werner in 1924, as he was the first non-Italian winner since 1920. Rudolf Caracciola repeated a similar upset win at the Mille Miglia a couple of years later. In 1927, Eliska Junkova, one of the great female drivers in Grand Prix motor racing history, became the first woman to ever compete in the race.

In addition to the automobile event, a Targa Florio motociclistica was held from 1920 to 1930. Ernst Jakob Henne (1904-2005) won in 1928 on a BMW before moving to four wheel BMWs.

The 1931 race saw a one-off return to the Grande course after roads and bridges specifically unique to the Medio course near Polizzi Generosa had been destroyed by landslides during severe rainstorms; the 1932 event saw the first use of the Piccolo course after a road connecting Caltavuturo and Collesano was constructed on the direct orders of Benito Mussolini himself by request of Florio. That road leads down into the valley, crosses the river on a small bridge, and climbs the hillside on the eastern side to join the Polizzi-Collesano road at Bivio Polizzi. In the 2010s, the western part of the road was interrupted by landslides. Tazio Nuvolari won this last classic Targa organized by Vincenzo Florio.

By 1933, 50 year old Florio was ousted by politics and automobile club members, and the race named after him suffered a decline, with fewer participants. The mixture of Grand Prix cars and sportscars at the Targa could not continue for long. For the new kind of single-seat GP racers, the AIACR European Championship was introduced, dominated by German Silver Arrows. The 24 Hours of Le Mans race with its fast straights and big supercharged Bentleys defined sportscar endurance racing. Even within Italy, many events became more significant, like the Mille Miglia, or the Tripoli Grand Prix in Italian North Africa. Without the international contacts and influence of Florio, the Targa could not uphold an unchallenged slot in the calendars. The 20 May 1934 Moroccan Grand Prix was held on the same day. In 1935, the Automobile Club di Sicilia tried to erase the name of Florio and call it Targa Primavera Siciliana, but that failed. It was the last real Targa event in the mountains, won by a Alfa Romeo P3 "Type B" Grand Prix car, with Grand Prix drivers like Antonio Brivio or Louis Chiron.

In 1936, the club could not organise a proper Targa. With time running out, on 20 December 1936, they barely managed to have a few amateurs with small touring cars do two laps of the Piccolo course to put a 1936 Targa Florio entry into history books. From 1937 to 1940, a circuit race in Palermo was held for the Voiturette racing class, dominated by the Maserati 6CM. The last two rounds were won by Luigi Villoresi. In 1941, even the Floriopolis pit facilities were dismantled.

After the war, in 1948, young men like Antonio Pucci and Raimondo Lanza di Trabia managed to revive the Targa Florio, once again as a single lap around the island, won by a Ferrari 166 S of Clemente Biondetti after 12 hours. The 1949 saw a return of Florio to the organisation, but the race was held in March, in rain, and started at night, ending after over 13 hours. Still no permissions for a mountain road race were given in 1950, thus it was yet another big lap around the island, 10° Giro di Sicilia, over 12 hours. In 1951, Giro and Targa were two separate events, as the 72 kilometer long or short Piccolo course could finally be used again, for a Targa that lasted only 7+ hours. Italian veteran racer Franco Cortese won in a British Frazer Nash Le Mans Replica. While the Targa was re-established, it was mostly a national event by and for Italians. The next three years saw Lancia wins. Distance was set to 8 laps for 576 km in over 6 hours.

In 1953, the FIA World Sportscar Championship was introduced, with the Mille Miglia held in May being chosen as the Italian round each year. When the Carrera Panamericana was cancelled after the 1954 event, its mid-October slot in the 1955 World Sportscar Championship was taken over by the 1955 Targa Florio. Sicily was back in the focus of international racing. To fit into the Championship, which typically required races of 1000km or more, 14 laps in about 10 hours would have been necessary, nearly doubling distance and time, but a compromise was reached to do only 13 laps for 936 km. The additional second Italian round gave the Daimler-Benz factory team a late opportunity to beat Scuderia Ferrari, Jaguar and Maserati for the title, and for a third Mercedes Targa win since 1922. After having missed the first two WC rounds, and having pulled out of the fatal 1955 Le Mans 24h race, only two championship race wins had been scored by the Mercedes-Benz 300 SLR. In the sixth round, a 1–2 win was needed, to prevent competitors from scoring points for 2nd place. After three weeks of practise, and despite a number of incidents, the 300 SLRs of Stirling Moss/Peter Collins and Juan Manuel Fangio/Karl Kling finished after 9+ hours only minutes ahead of the best Ferrari and the 3rd SLR, thus securing the title.

The 1956 World Sportscar Championship had only five rounds, as Le Mans was excluded for limiting prototype engine capacity to only 2.5 liter rather than 3.0, and the Targa for Count Florio insisting on running 10 laps rather than only 8 as demanded by the CSI officials who were much more concerned now about safety. International entrants took part anyway, and the non-championship 1956 Targa Florio saw the first of many wins for Porsche.

Disaster struck at the 1957 Mille Miglia in which 12 people were killed. The Italian government decreed the end of the Mille Miglia and banned all motor racing on the public roads of Italy, which also affected the Targa Florio in that year. The race was cancelled, but in November a regularity contest was held as 1957 Targa Florio.

In the 1958 World Sportscar Championship, the Targa again became a round in the Championship, replacing the discontinued Mille Miglia as the Italian round of the Championship, run in May. Championship status was held until the 1973 World Sportscar Championship.

=== Course variants ===
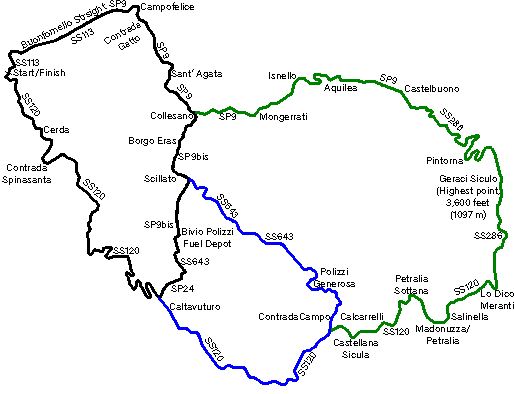
All the Targa Florio Madonie circuit variants Black: Piccolo circuit Blue: Medio circuit Green: Grande circuit

Several versions of the track were used. It started with a single lap of a 148 km (92 mi) circuit from 1906 to 1911 and 1931. From 1912 to 1914 a tour around the perimeter of Sicily was used, with a single lap of 975 kilometres (606 mi), lengthened to 1,080 kilometres (670 mi) from 1948 to 1950. The 146 km "Grande" circuit was then shortened twice, the first time to 108 km (67 mi), the version used from 1919 to 1930, and then to the 72 km (45 mi) circuit used from 1932 to 1936 and 1951 to 1977. From 1951 to 1958, the long coastal island tour variant was used for a separate event called the Giro di Sicilia (Lap of Sicily).

The start and finish took place at Cerda. The counter-clockwise lap lead from Caltavuturo and Collesano from an altitude over 600 metres (1,970 ft) down to sea level, where the cars raced from Campofelice di Roccella on the Buonfornello straight along the coast, a straight that was even longer than the Mulsanne Straight at the Circuit de la Sarthe in Le Mans. The longest version of the circuit went south through Caltavuturo (whereas the shortest version of the open-road circuit went east just before entry into Caltavuturo, through a mountainous section directly to Collesano) through an extended route through elevation changes, and climbed uphill through the nearby towns of Castellana, Sottana, Madonnuzza and Miranti, twisting around mountains up to the highest point- 1,100 metres (3,600 ft) at Geraci Siculo, dropping down 620 metres (2,030 ft) into Castelbuono, twisting around more mountains and passing through Isnello and the village of Mongerrati and then rejoined the most recent version of the track at Collesano. The second version of the track also went south through Caltavuturo and took a shortcut starting right before Castellana to Collesano via the town of Polizzi Generosa.

A closed circuit called Favorita Park in the Sicilian capital of Palermo was used from 1937 to 1940. Most of the roads used for all the variations of the circuits are still in use and can be driven on today, but some are affected by landslides and potholes. The Buonfornello straight was not upgraded to a motorway as the Autostrade motorway was built nearby.

The challenge of the Targa was unprecedented in its difficulty and the driving experience of any of the course variants was unlike any other circuit in the world other than perhaps that of the Nürburgring in Germany and (for motorcycles) and the much faster but similar Snaefell Mountain Course on the Isle of Man. All of the variants had 18 to 23 corners per mile (11 to 14 corners per kilometer)- the original Grande 146 km (91 mi) circuit had in the realm of 2,000 corners per lap, the 108 km (67 mi) Medio had about 1,300-1,400 corners per lap and the final iteration of the course, the 72 km (45 mi) Piccolo circuit had about 800-900 corners per lap. To put that into perspective, most purpose-built circuits have between 12 and 18 corners, and the longest purpose-built circuit in the world, the 13-mile Nürburgring Nordschleife, has about 180 corners. So learning any of the Targa Florio courses was extremely difficult and required, like most long circuits, at least 60 laps to learn the course- and unlike the purpose-built Nürburgring, the course had to be learned properly in public traffic, and one lap of even the Piccolo course would take over an hour to do in a road car- if there was little to no traffic. To even finish this punishing race required a very reliable car- and it being a slow, twisty circuit it was very hard on the gearbox, brakes and the suspension of a car. Some manufacturers and entrants, particularly non-Italian ones would sometimes outright skip the Targa because of the difficulty of learning the layout and were unsure if their cars could stand the brutal pace there. Some teams, like Mercedes and Porsche, arrived weeks in advance for preparation. Porsche factory drivers even had to watch films of the circuit in the offseason.

=== Lap speeds ===
Like a rally event (and events like the Isle of Man TT and the Mille Miglia), the race cars were started one by one every 15 seconds for a time trial, as a start from a full grid was not possible on the tight and twisty roads. Racing for positions made few sense as a car that caught up to another was already ahead in the classification.

Although the public road circuit used for the Targa was extremely challenging- it was a very different kind of circuit and race from any other race on the sportscar calendar. All of the circuit variations of the Targa had so many corners that lap speeds at the Targa never went higher than 80 mph (128 km/h), as opposed to Le Mans in France, where cars would average 150+ mph (240+ km/h) or the Nürburgring, where cars would average 110 mph (176 km/h). Helmut Marko set the lap record in 1972 in an Alfa Romeo 33TT3 at 33 min 41 s at an average of 128.253 km/h (79.693 mph) during an epic charge where he made up 2 minutes on Arturo Merzario and his Ferrari 312PB. The fastest ever was Leo Kinnunen in 1970, lapping in the Porsche 908/3 at 128.571 km/h (79.890 mph) or 33 min 36 seconds flat.

Due to the track's length, drivers practised in the week before the race in public traffic, often with their race cars fitted with license plates. Porsche factory drivers even had to watch onboard videos, a sickening experience for some. The lap record for the 146 km "Grande" circuit was 2 hours 3 min 54.8 seconds set by Achille Varzi in a Bugatti Type 51 at the 1931 race at an average speed of 70.7 km/h (43.931 mph). The lap record for the 108 km "Medio" circuit was 1 hour 21 min 21.6 seconds set by Varzi in an Alfa Romeo P2 at an average speed of 79.642 km/h (49.487 mph) at the 1930 race. The fastest completion around the short version of the island tour was done by Giovanni "Ernesto" Ceirano in a SCAT at the 1914 race, completed in 16 hours, 51 minutes and 31.6 seconds from May 24–25, 1914. The fastest completion of the long version of the island tour was by Mario and Franco Bornigia in an Alfa Romeo 6C 2500 Competizione, completed in 12 hours, 26 minutes and 33 seconds flat at the 1950 race at an average speed of 86.794 km/h (53.931 mph).

=== 1970s, safety and demise ===
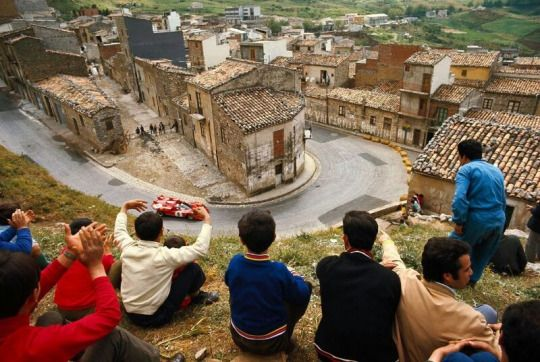
At the 1970 race, the Ferrari 512S of Nino Vaccarella/Ignazio Giunti navigates a tight corner in the town of Collesano.

In the late 1960s and early 1970s, race cars with up to 600 hp (450 kW) such as Nino Vaccarella's Ferrari 512S raced through small mountain villages while spectators sat or stood right next to, or even on, the road. Porsche, on the other hand, did not race its big and powerful 917K, but evolved rather the nimbler Porsche 908 into a shortened 908/03 Spyder derived from the hillclimbing cars.

Due to safety concerns, especially by Helmut Marko, who called the race "totally insane", the last Targa Florio as an international event was as part of the FIA 1973 World Sportscar Championship. Before and during this 1973 Targa Florio event, there were an unusually high number of accidents, two of which were fatal; one which privateer Charles Blyth crashed his Lancia Fulvia HF into a trailer at the end of the Buonfornello straight and was killed; and another where an Italian driver crashed his Alpine-Renault into a group of spectators, killing one. There were several other accidents during practice in which a total of seven spectators sustained injuries. The event was won by a Porsche 911 Carrera RS prototype as the proper prototype-sportcars of Alfa and Ferrari suffered crashes or other troubles, some being driven by F1-pilots like Jacky Ickx and Clay Regazzoni with hardly any Targa experience.

The Targa's international demise was compounded by widespread concern about the organizers' inability to properly maintain the race on such a massive circuit which was both race track and access road for spectators, and also regular living space of the local population. There were not enough marshals, most spectators sat too close to the roads, and also the international automotive governing body, the FIA, mandated safety walls on all circuits that hold FIA-mandated events from 1974 onwards. The 72-kilometre (45 mi) length of combined public roads made this impracticable, especially from a financial standpoint. The sport's growing professionalism was something the Targa's organizers simply could not keep up with. One example of this concern was when Briton Brian Redman crashed his Porsche 908/03 during the 1971 event 20 miles into the first lap. The steering on his car broke, and it hit a stone wall and caught fire. Redman had second-degree burns all over his body and it took 45 minutes for any medical help to reach Redman (while he was attended to by spectators who were trying to keep him cool by waving objects). The Porsche team did not know where he was for 12 hours until teammates Pedro Rodriguez and Richard Attwood found him in a local clinic in Cefalu. Also during this race Alain de Cadenet in a Lola was going down the Buonfornello straight and a piece of bodywork flew off a car in front of him and hit him on the head. He was knocked out cold; the Lola went off the road, crashed into a nearby wall, and caught fire. His life was saved not by marshals, but by an active Italian military serviceman who was watching the race from a location close to de Cadenet's crash and pulled him out of the wreck. De Cadenet was taken to the same clinic in Cefalu where Redman was, where he was badly burned and had lost the use of his left eye.

The Targa was continued as a national event for four years, before a crash in 1977 where hillclimbing specialist Gabriele Ciuti went off the road and crashed at the fast curves at the end of the Buonfornello straight after some of the bodywork flew off his BMW-powered Osella prototype. This accident killed two spectators and seriously injured five others (including Ciuti, who went into a coma, but survived), and effectively sealed the race's fate- it was never run in its original format ever again. After this accident the race was forcibly taken over by local police and was stopped on the 4th lap, and it also saw two other drivers having serious accidents; one of them was critically injured, but survived.

Although the Targa Florio was a rally-type race that took place on closed-off public mountain roads with (aside from straw bales and weak guardrails at some of the turns, the latter were installed by the island's government) practically no safety features, only 9 people – including spectators – died at the event over the 71 year and 61 race history using a total of 6 circuit configurations. This number is relatively small compared to other open road races like the Mille Miglia, where over a period of 30 years and 24 races 56 people lost their lives, and the Carrera Panamericana, where over a period of 5 years and 5 races 25 people were killed. This is probably due to the fact that the very twisty nature of the mountain roads used kept average lap speeds very low, never going above 80 mph (130 km/h), even with the very long straight at the northernmost end of the track. In comparison, most road circuits had average speeds anywhere between 110 mph (180 km/h) and 160 mph (260 km/h). Like most previously used street circuits throughout history, it is still possible to drive on all the roads used for every Targa Florio dating back to 1906.

== Legacy ==
After winning the race several times, Porsche named the hardtop convertible version of the 911 after the Targa. The name targa means plaque or plate, see targa top.

The Australian-made Leyland P76 had a special version named Targa Florio to commemorate victory by journalist-rallyist Evan Green on a Special Stage of the 1974 London-Sahara-Munich World Cup Rally which was held on the Targa Florio course.

Since 1992 the event has lent its name to a modern recreation, staged half-a-world away in the form of the famous road rally Targa Tasmania held on the island state of Tasmania, off the Southern coast of Australia. There are also the Targa New Zealand since 1995, the Targa Newfoundland since 2002 and Targa Great Barrier Reef since 2018 where it is held in the Far North section of Queensland.

2017 saw the 101st Anniversary of the Targa Florio, and the first time the event has left Italy. Held in Victoria, Australia, the event took place from November 29 to December 3 and featured over 150 cars..

== Winners ==
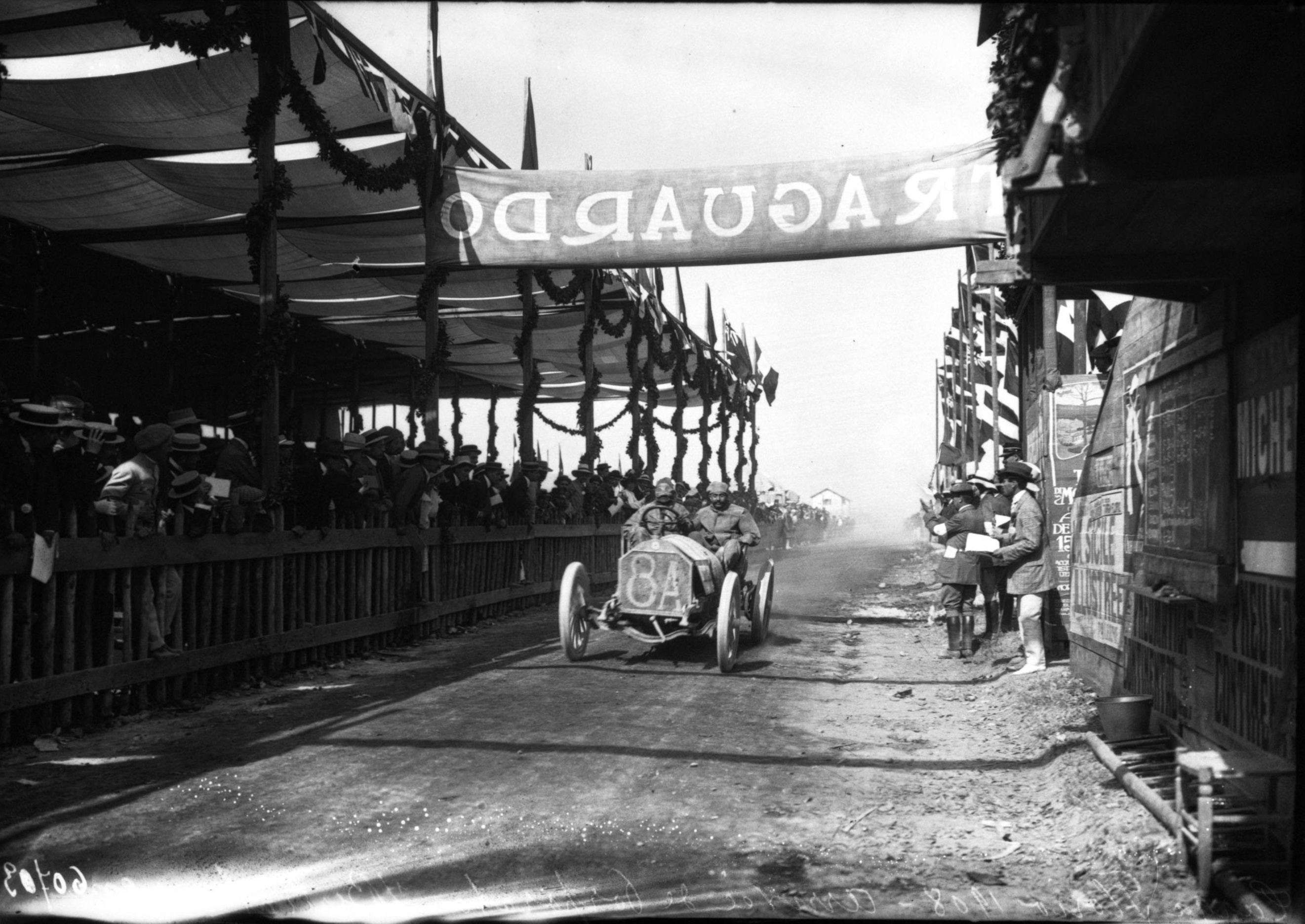
Jean Porporato finishing fourth at the 1908 race with Berliet.

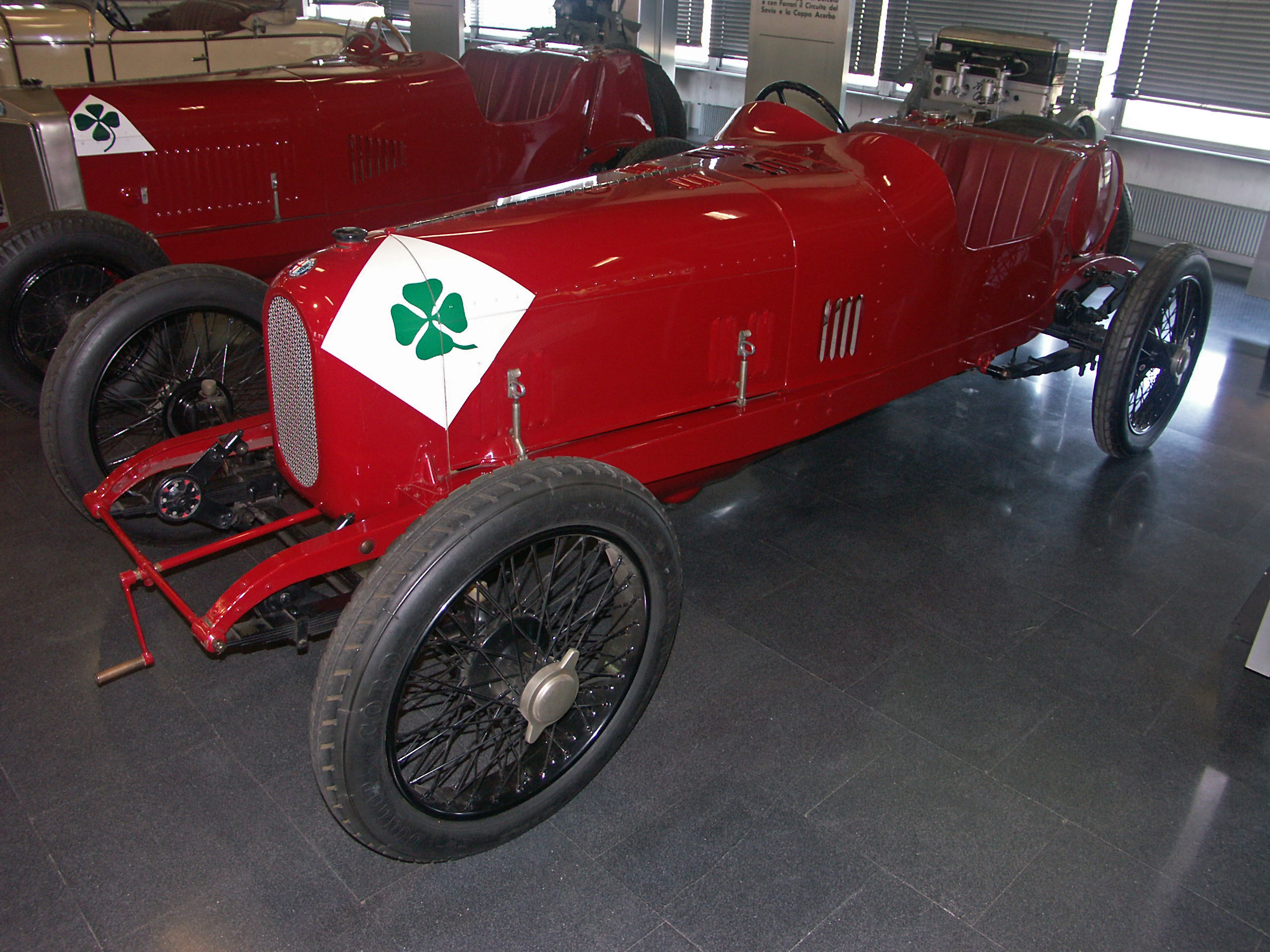
Alfa Romeo RL TF - winner in 1923.

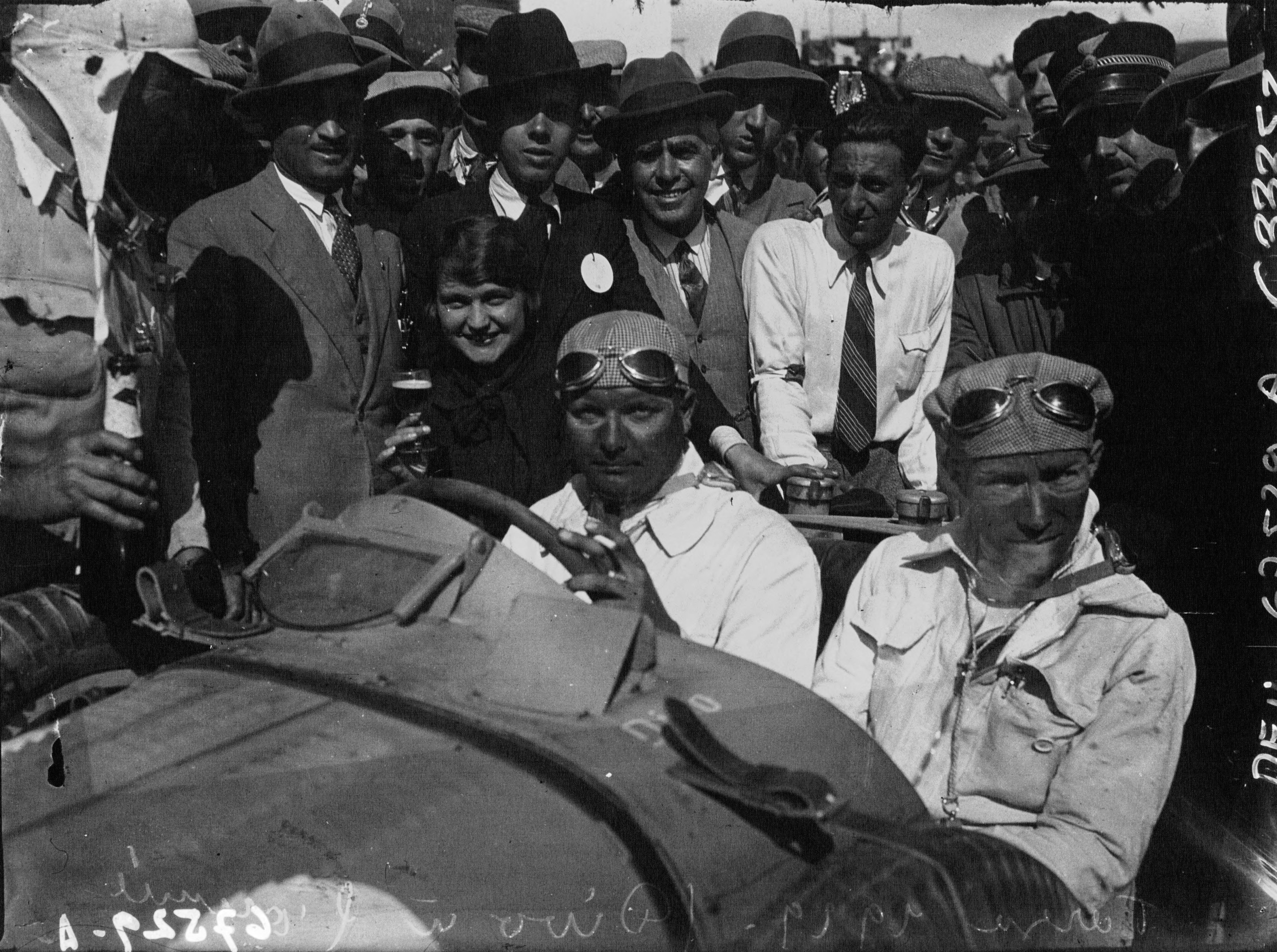
Albert Divo at the 1929 Targa Florio with Bugatti Type 35C.

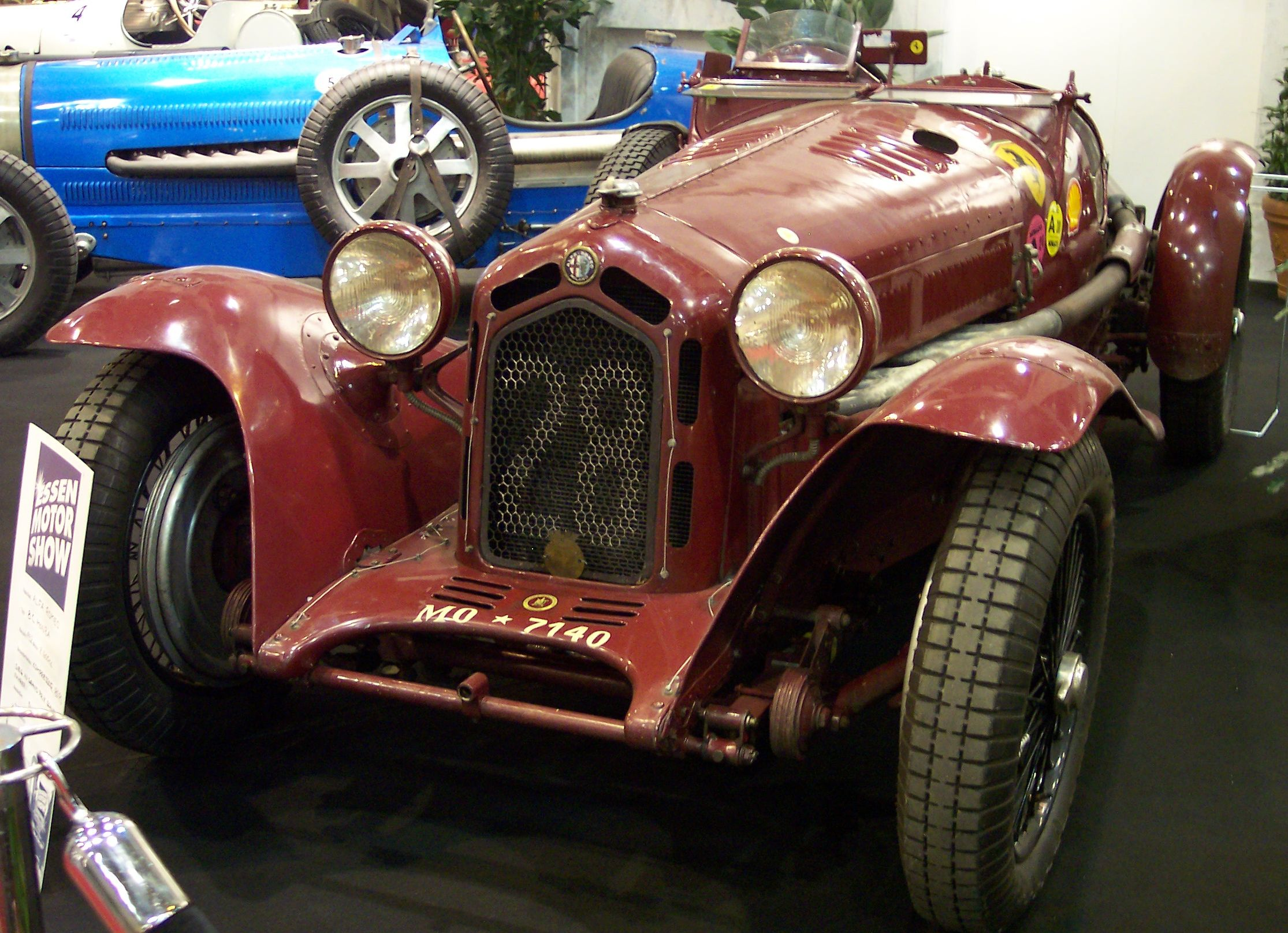
Alfa Romeo 8C winner in 1931, 1932 and 1933.

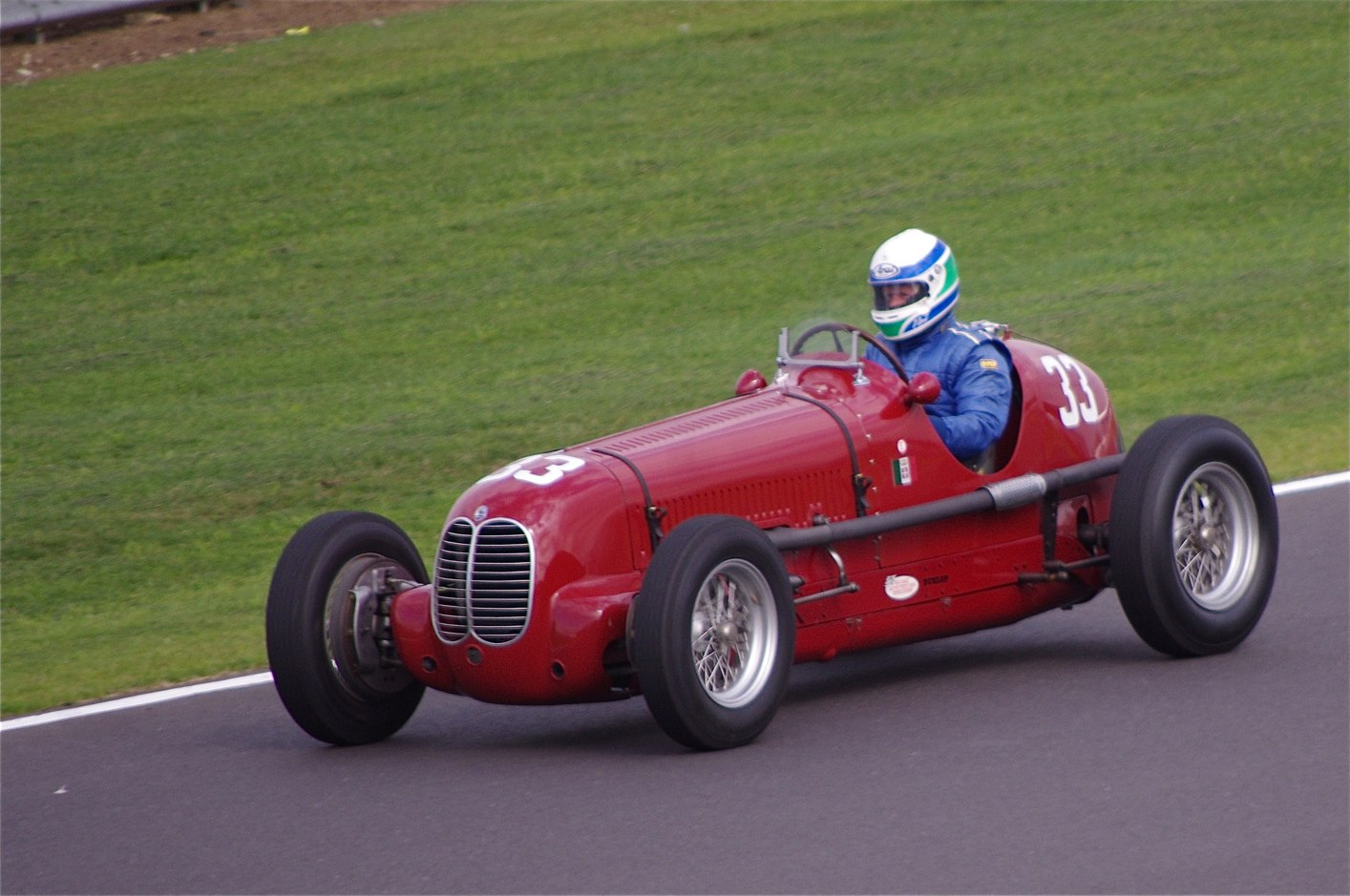
Maserati 6CM - winner in 1937–1939

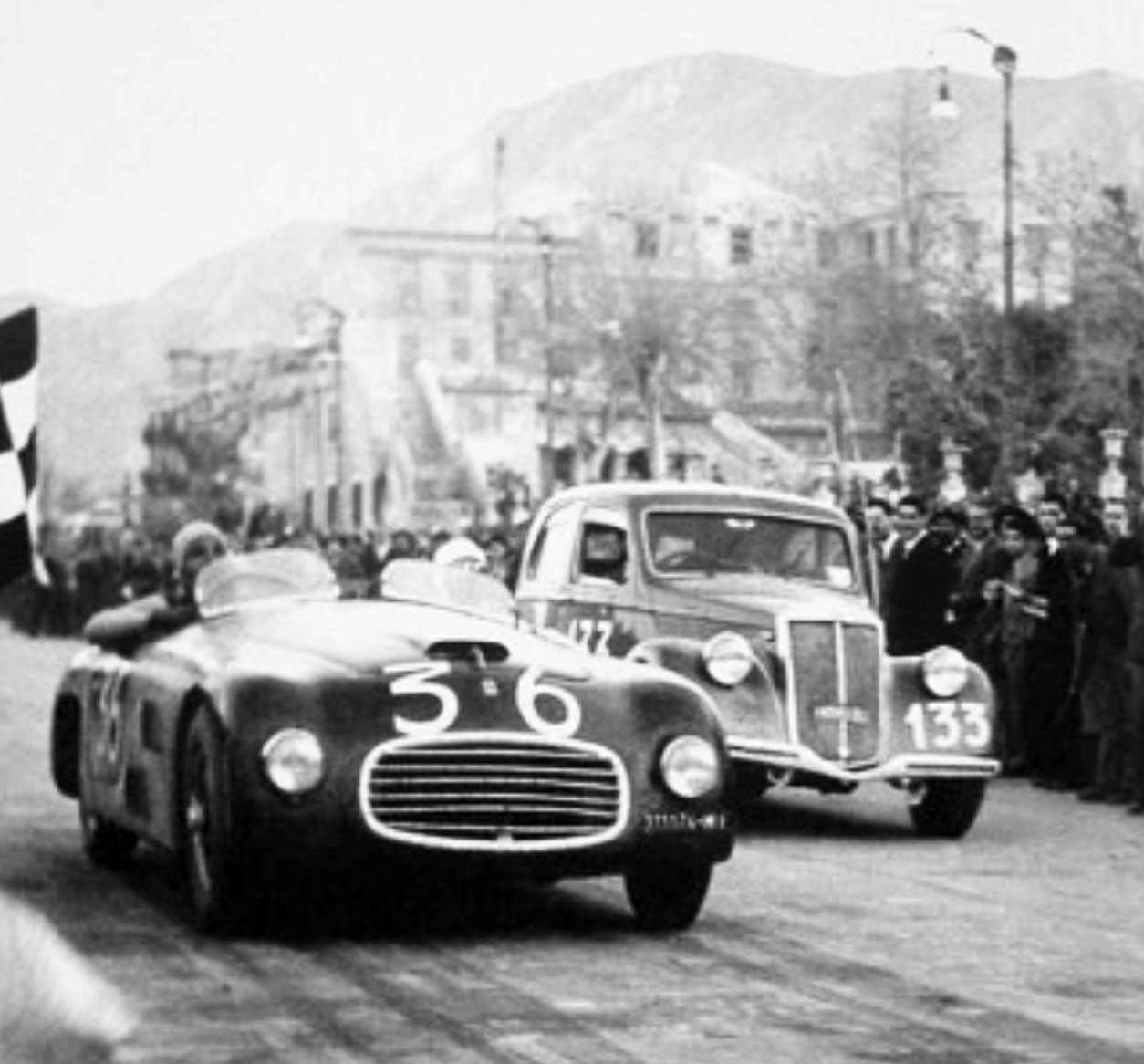
166 S (#001S) by Allemano winning its first race, Targa Florio (April 3, 1948), by Igor Troubetzkoy and Clemente Biondetti

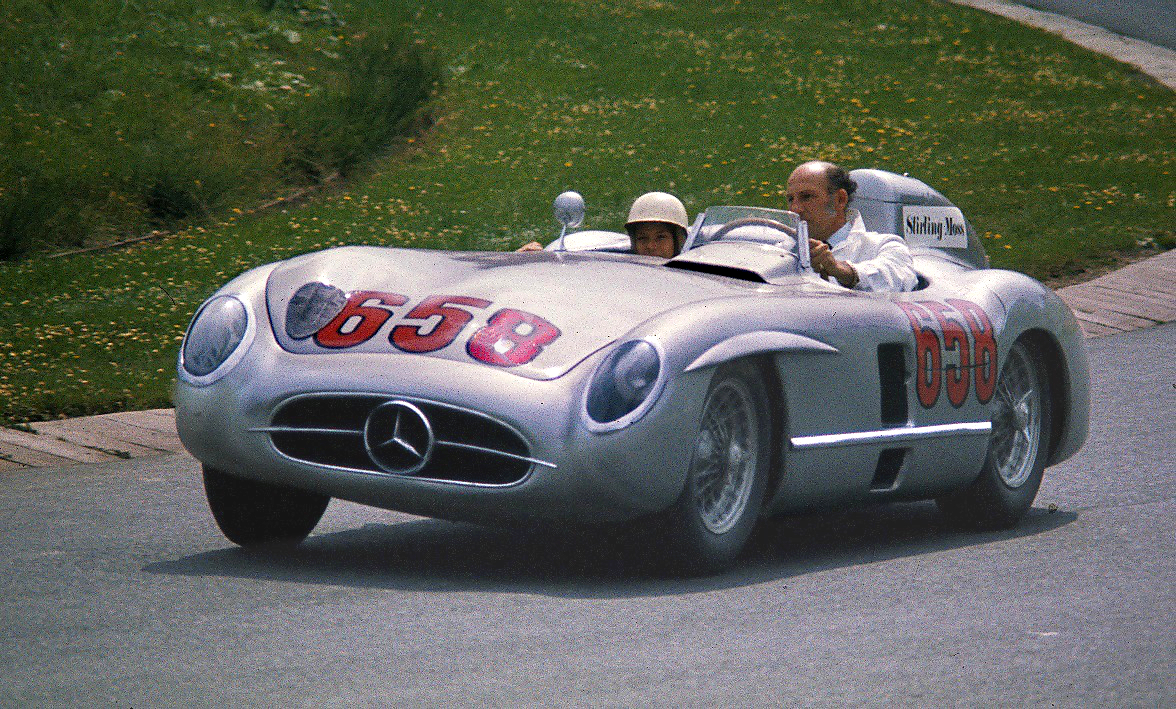
Mercedes-Benz 300 SLR similar to the 1955 winner driven by Stirling Moss

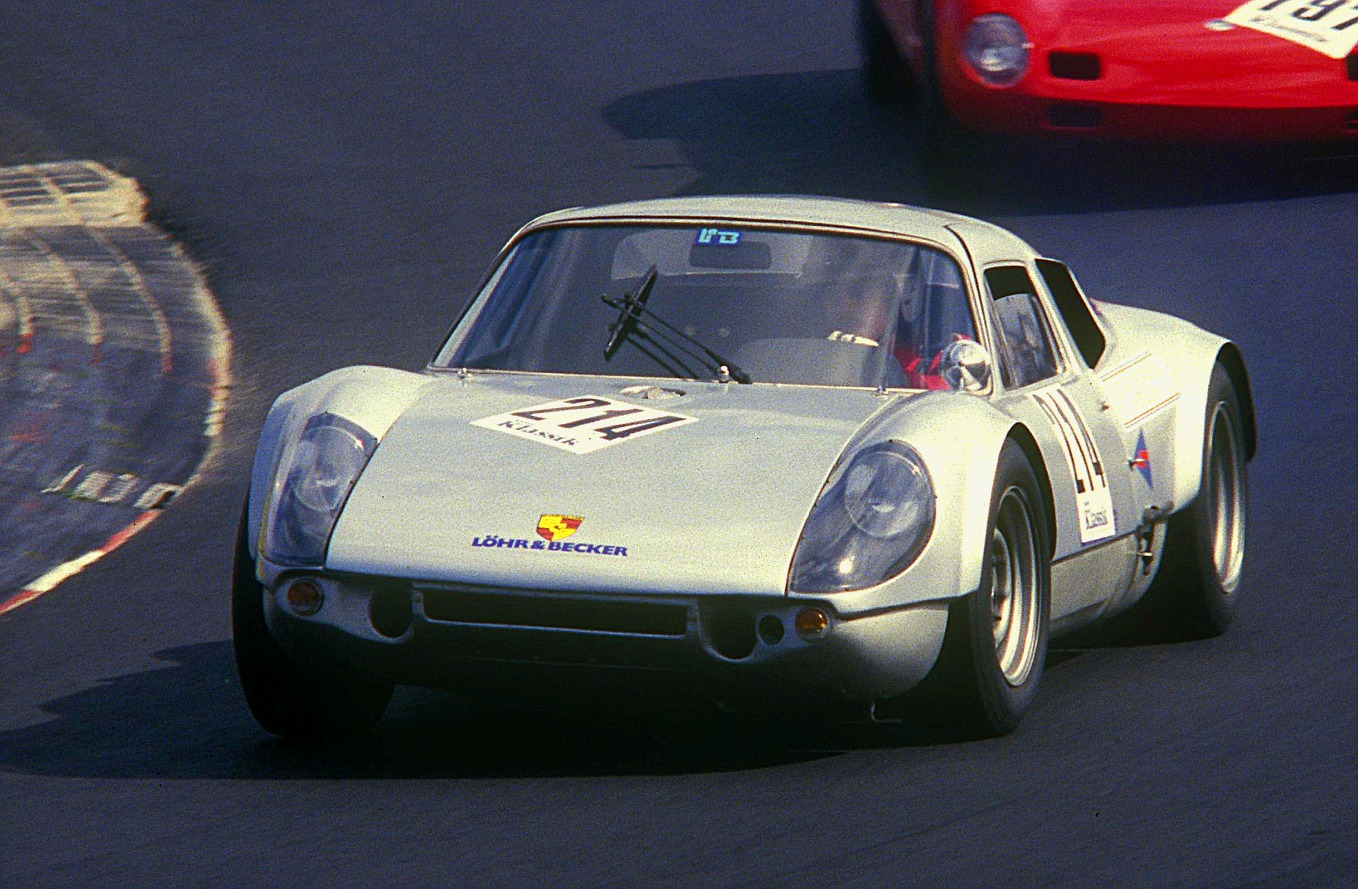
Porsche 904 similar to 1964 winner of Colin Davis and Antonio Pucci

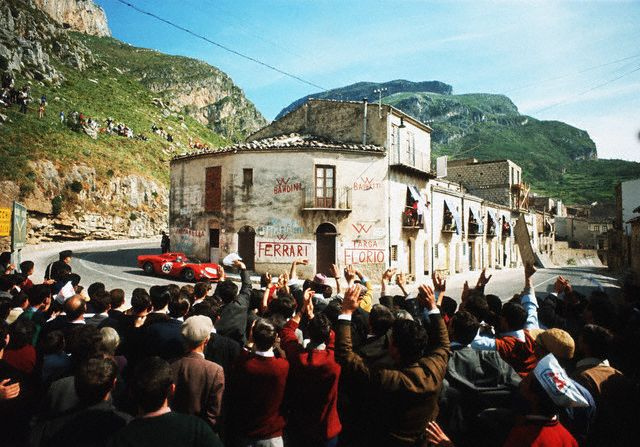
Targa Florio 1965, Collesano

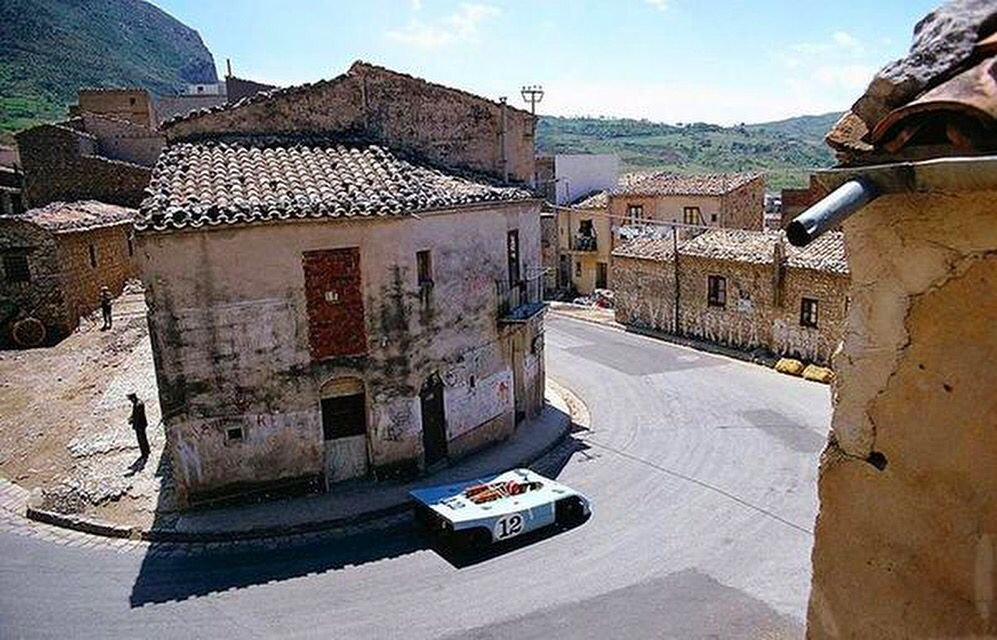
Porsche 908/3 driven by winners Jo Siffert and Brian Redman in 1970, going through a hairpin in Collesano with Siffert driving

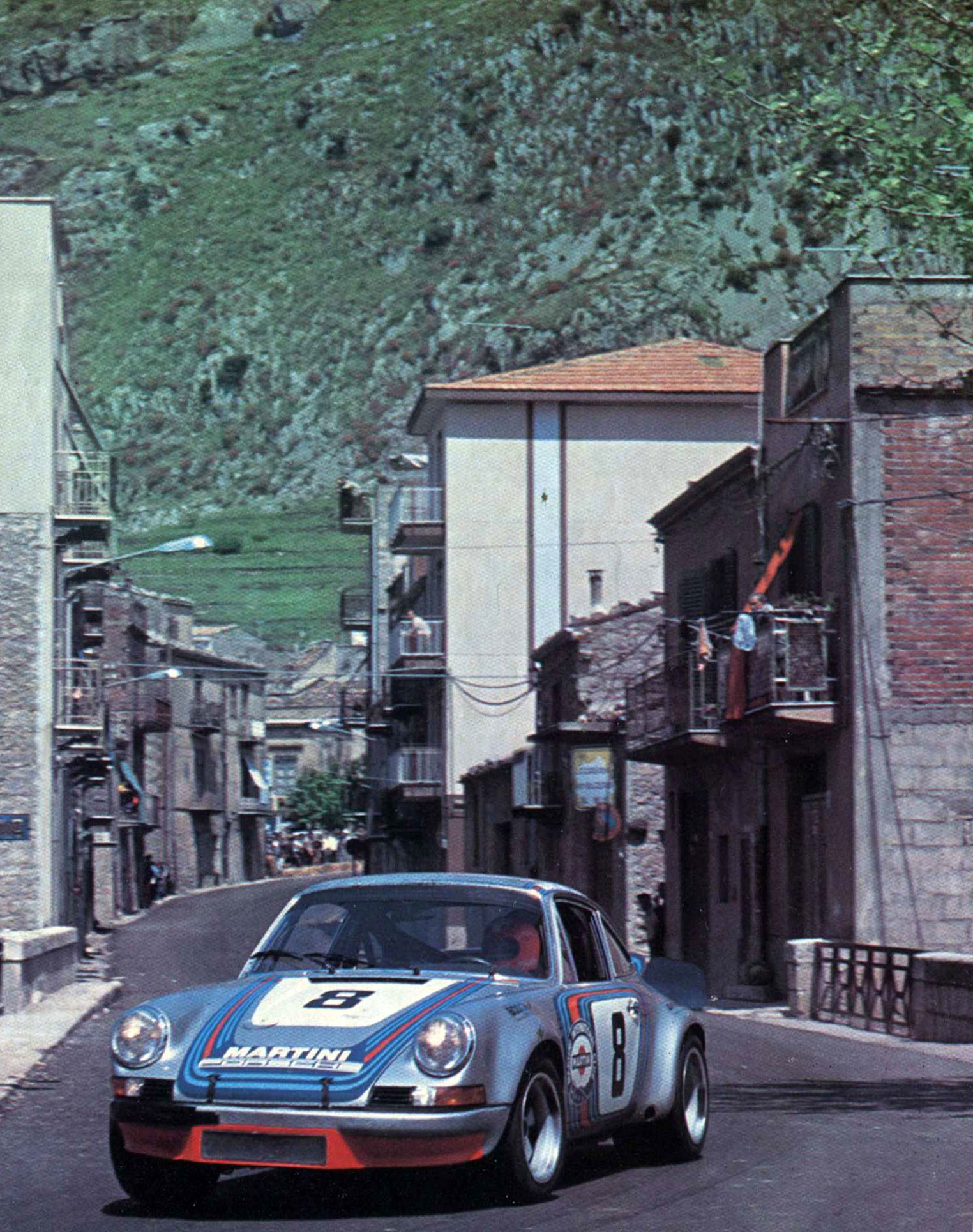
Porsche 911 Carrera RSR driven by Herbert Müller and Gijs van Lennep in 1973 in Collesano

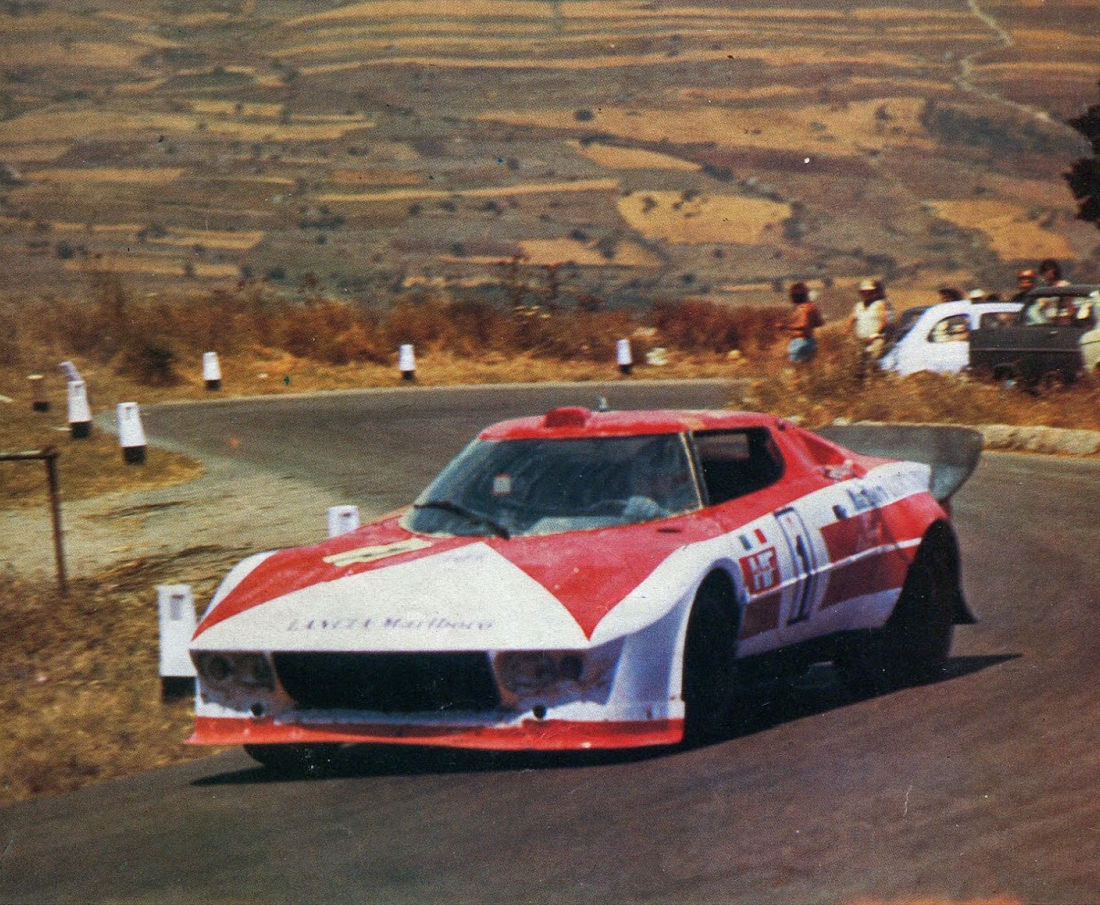
Lancia Stratos HF Prototype winner of the 1974 edition

Year	Winner	Car	Time	Distance (km)	Speed (km/h)	Laps	Course Variant
1906	(Italy) Alessandro Cagno	Itala 35/40 HP	9:32:22.0	446.469	46.80	3	Grande Circuit (146 km)
1907	(Italy) Felice Nazzaro	Fiat 28/40 HP	8:17:36.4	446.469	53.83	3	Grande Circuit (146 km)
1908	(Italy) Vincenzo Trucco	Isotta Fraschini 50 HP	7:49:26.0	446.469	57.06	3	Grande Circuit (146 km)
1909	(Italy) Francesco Ciuppa	S.P.A. 28/40 HP	2:43:19.2	148.823	54.67	1	Grande Circuit (146 km)
1910	(Italy) Franco Tullio Cariolato	Franco Automobili 35/50 HP	6:20:47.4	297.646	46.90	2	Grande Circuit (146 km)
1911	(Italy) Giovanni "Ernesto" Ceirano	SCAT 22/32 HP	9:32:22.4	446.469	46.80	3	Grande Circuit (146 km)
1912	(United Kingdom) Cyril Snipe	SCAT 25/35 HP	23:37:19.8	979.000	41.44	1	Island Tour (short) (979 km)
1913	(Italy) Felice Nazzaro	Nazzaro Tipo 2	19:18:40.6	979.000	50.70	1	Island Tour (short) (979 km)
1914	(Italy) Giovanni "Ernesto" Ceirano	SCAT 22/32	16:51:31.6	979.000	58.07	1	Island Tour (short) (979 km)
1919	(France) André Boillot	Peugeot EXS	7:51:01.8	432	55	4	Media Circuit (108 km)
1920	(Italy) Guido Meregalli	Nazzaro GP	8:27:23.8	432	50.924	4	Media Circuit (108 km)
1921	(Italy) Giulio Masetti	Fiat 451	7:25:05.2	432	58.236	4	Media Circuit (108 km)
1922	(Italy) Giulio Masetti	Mercedes GP/14	6:50:50.2	432	63.091	4	Media Circuit (108 km)
1923	(Italy) Ugo Sivocci	Alfa Romeo RL Targa Florio	7:18:00.2	432	59.177	4	Media Circuit (108 km)
1924	(Germany) Christian Werner	Mercedes Tipo Indy 2,0	6:32:37.4	432	66.010	4	Media Circuit (108 km)
1925	(Italy) Bartolomeo Costantini	Bugatti T35	7:32:27.2	540	71.609	5	Media Circuit (108 km)
1926	(Italy) Bartolomeo Costantini	Bugatti T35T	7:20:45.0	540	73.507	5	Media Circuit (108 km)
1927	(Italy) Emilio Materassi	Bugatti T35C	7:35:55.4	540	71.065	5	Media Circuit (108 km)
1928	(France) Albert Divo	Bugatti T35B	7:20:56.6	540	73.478	5	Media Circuit (108 km)
1929	(France) Albert Divo	Bugatti T35C	7:15:41.7	540	74.366	5	Media Circuit (108 km)
1930	(Italy) Achille Varzi	Alfa Romeo P2	6:55:16.6	540	78.010	5	Media Circuit (108 km)
1931	(Italy) Tazio Nuvolari	Alfa Romeo 8C-2300 Monza	9:00:27.0	584	64.834	4	Grande Circuit (146 km)
1932	(Italy) Tazio Nuvolari	Alfa Romeo 8C-2300 Monza	7:15:50.6	574	79.296	8	Piccolo Circuit (72 km)
1933	(Italy) Antonio Brivio	Alfa Romeo 8C-2300 Monza	6:35:03.0	504	76.729	7	Piccolo Circuit (72 km)
1934	(Italy) Achille Varzi	Alfa Romeo Tipo-B P3	6:14:26.8	432	69.222	6	Piccolo Circuit (72 km)
1935	(Italy) Antonio Brivio	Alfa Romeo Tipo-B P3	5:27:29.0	432	80.010	6	Piccolo Circuit (72 km)
1936	(Italy) Constantino Magistri	Lancia Augusta	2:08:47.2	144	67.088	2	Piccolo Circuit (72 km)
1937	(Italy) Giulio Severi	Maserati 6CM	2:55'49.0	315.6	107.704	60	Favorita Park (5.26 km)
1938	(Italy) Giovanni Rocco	Maserati 6CM	1:30'04.6	171.6	114.303	30	Favorita Park (5.26 km)
1939	(Italy) Luigi Villoresi	Maserati 6CM	1:40.15.4	228	136.445	40	Favorita Park (5.26 km)
1940	(Italy) Luigi Villoresi	Maserati 4CL	1:36.08.6	228	142.288	40	Favorita Park (5.26 km)
1948	(Italy) Clemente Biondetti (France) Igor Troubetzkoy	Ferrari 166 S	12:12'00.0	1080	88.866	1	Island Tour (long) (1080 km)
1949	(Italy) Clemente Biondetti (Italy) Aldo Benedetti	Ferrari 166 SC	13:15.09.4	1080	81.494	1	Island Tour (long) (1080 km)
1950	(Italy) Mario Bornigia (Italy) Giancarlo Bornigia	Alfa Romeo 6C 2500 Competizione	12:26.33.0	1080	86.794	1	Island Tour (long) (1080 km)
1951	(Italy) Franco Cortese	Frazer Nash	7:31.04.8	576	76.631	8	Piccolo Circuit (72 km)
1952	(Italy) Felice Bonetto	Lancia Aurelia B20	7:11.58.0	576	76.631	8	Piccolo Circuit (72 km)
1953	(Italy) Umberto Maglioli	Lancia D20 3000	7:08.35.8	576	80.635	8	Piccolo Circuit (72 km)
1954	(Italy) Piero Taruffi	Lancia D24	6:24.18.0	576	89.930	8	Piccolo Circuit (72 km)
1955	(United Kingdom) Stirling Moss (United Kingdom) Peter Collins	Mercedes-Benz 300 SLR	9:43.14.0	936	96.290	13	Piccolo Circuit (72 km)
1956	(Italy) Umberto Maglioli (Germany) Huschke von Hanstein	Porsche 550 1.5	7:54.52.6	720	90.770	10	Piccolo Circuit (72 km)
1957	(Italy) Fabio Colona	Fiat 600	regularity	359	—	5	Piccolo Circuit (72 km)
1958	(Italy) Luigi Musso (Belgium) Olivier Gendebien	Ferrari 250 TR 58	10:37.58.1	1008	94.801	14	Piccolo Circuit (72 km)
1959	(Germany) Edgar Barth (Germany) Wolfgang Seidel	Porsche 718 RSK 1.5	11:02.21.8	1008	91.309	14	Piccolo Circuit (72 km)
1960	(Sweden) Jo Bonnier (Germany) Hans Herrmann	Porsche 718 RS 60 1.6	7:33.08.2	720	95.320	10	Piccolo Circuit (72 km)
1961	(Germany) Wolfgang von Trips (Belgium) Olivier Gendebien	Ferrari 246 SP	6:57.39.4	720	103.433	10	Piccolo Circuit (72 km)
1962	(Belgium) Willy Mairesse (Mexico) Ricardo Rodriguez (Belgium) Olivier Gendebien	Ferrari 246 SP	7:02'56.3	720	102.143	10	Piccolo Circuit (72 km)
1963	(Sweden) Jo Bonnier (Italy) Carlo Maria Abate	Porsche 718 GTR 2.0	6:55.45.1	720	109.908	10	Piccolo Circuit (72 km)
1964	(United Kingdom) Colin Davis (Italy) Antonio Pucci	Porsche 904 GTS 2.0	7:10.53.3	720	100.258	10	Piccolo Circuit (72 km)
1965	(Italy) Nino Vaccarella (Italy) Lorenzo Bandini	Ferrari 275 P2	7:01:12.4	720	102.563	10	Piccolo Circuit (72 km)
1966	(Belgium) Willy Mairesse (Switzerland) Herbert Müller	Porsche Carrera 6 2.0	7:16:32.6	720	98.910	10	Piccolo Circuit (72 km)
1967	(Australia) Paul Hawkins (Germany) Rolf Stommelen	Porsche 910/8 2.2	6:37.01.0	720	108.812	10	Piccolo Circuit (72 km)
1968	(United Kingdom) Vic Elford (Italy) Umberto Maglioli	Porsche 907 2.2	6:28:47.9	720	111.112	10	Piccolo Circuit (72 km)
1969	(Germany) Gerhard Mitter (Germany) Udo Schütz	Porsche 908/02	6:07:45.3	720	117.469	10	Piccolo Circuit (72 km)
1970	(Switzerland) Jo Siffert (United Kingdom) Brian Redman	Porsche 908/03	6:35.30.0	792	120.152	11	Piccolo Circuit (72 km)
1971	(Italy) Nino Vaccarella (Netherlands) Toine Hezemans	Alfa Romeo 33/3	6:35:46.2	792	120.070	11	Piccolo Circuit (72 km)
1972	(Italy) Arturo Merzario (Italy) Sandro Munari	Ferrari 312PB	6:27:48.0	792	122.537	11	Piccolo Circuit (72 km)
1973	(Switzerland) Herbert Müller (Netherlands) Gijs van Lennep	Porsche 911 Carrera RSR 2.8	6:54:20.1	792	114.691	11	Piccolo Circuit (72 km)
1974	(France) Gérard Larrousse (Italy) Amilcare Ballestrieri	Lancia Stratos	4:35:02.6	576	114.883	8	Piccolo Circuit (72 km)
1975	(Italy) Nino Vaccarella (Italy) Arturo Merzario	Alfa Romeo 33TT12	4:59:16.7	576	120.895	8	Piccolo Circuit (72 km)
1976	(Italy) Eugenio Renna (Italy) Armando Floridia	Osella PA4-BMW	5:43:46.0	576	99.090	8	Piccolo Circuit (72 km)
1977	(Italy) Raffaele Restivo (Italy) Alfonso Merendino	Chevron B36-BMW	2:41:17.0	288	107.140	4	Piccolo Circuit (72 km)

The race in 1955 was a one-off replacement for the cancelled Carrera Panamericana, adding a second Italian event to the 1955 World Sportscar Championship. Following the 1957 Mille Miglia tragedy, the 1957 Targa was held only as a regularity test. Replacing the cancelled Mille Miglia, the Targa was from 1958 to 1973 part of the World Sportscar Championship seasons.

=== Wins by manufacturer ===
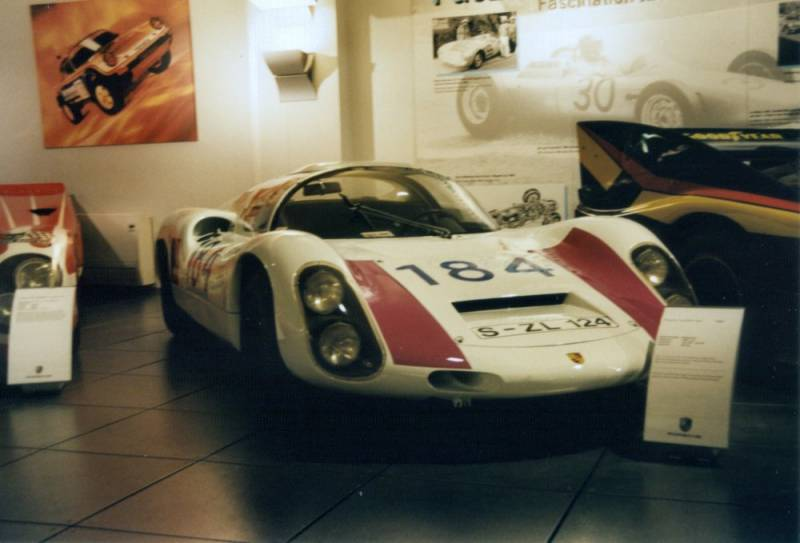
Porsche 910 2.0 coupé driven by Umberto Maglioli and Udo Schütz in 1967.

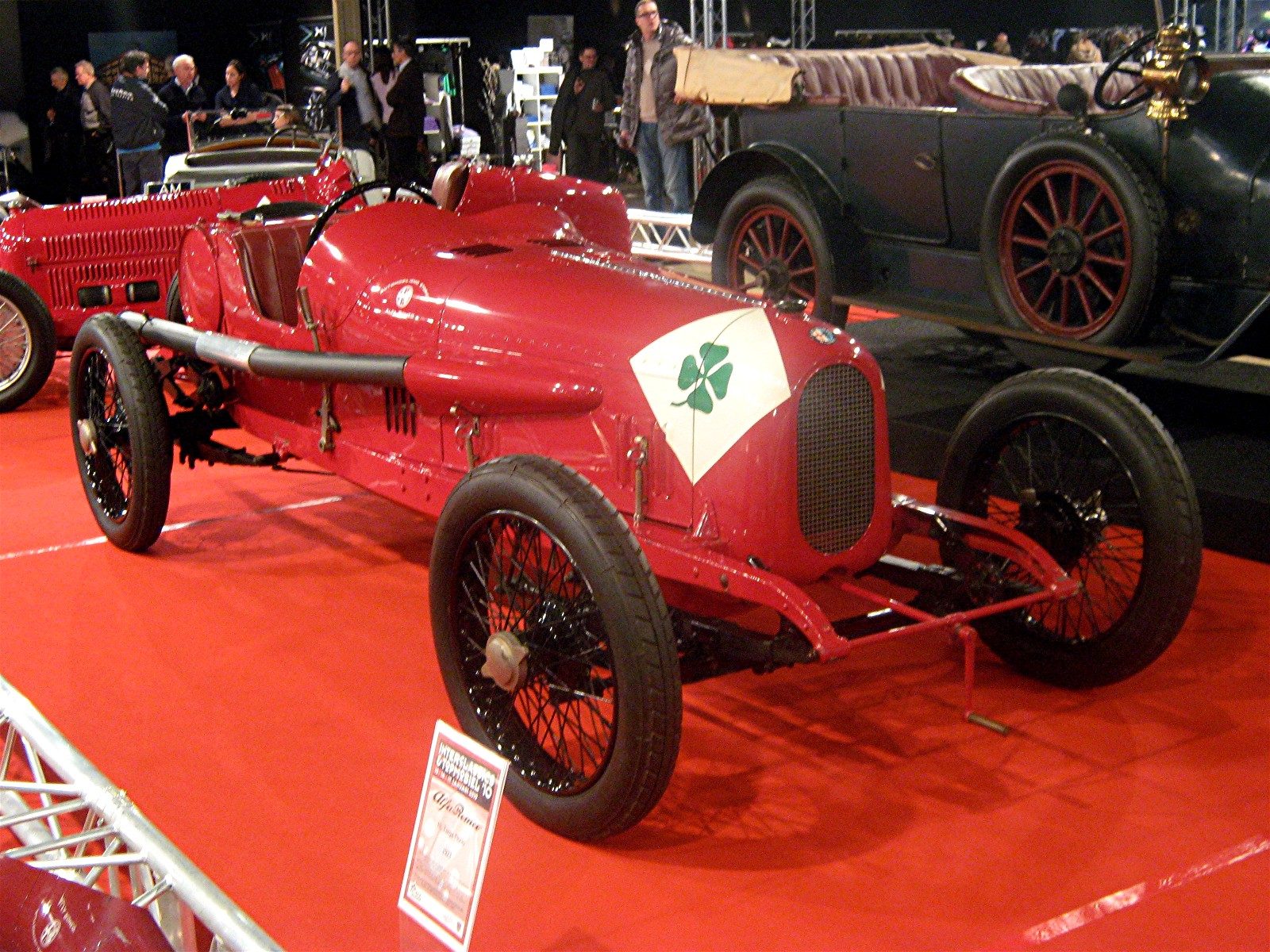
Alfa Romeo RL Targa Florio

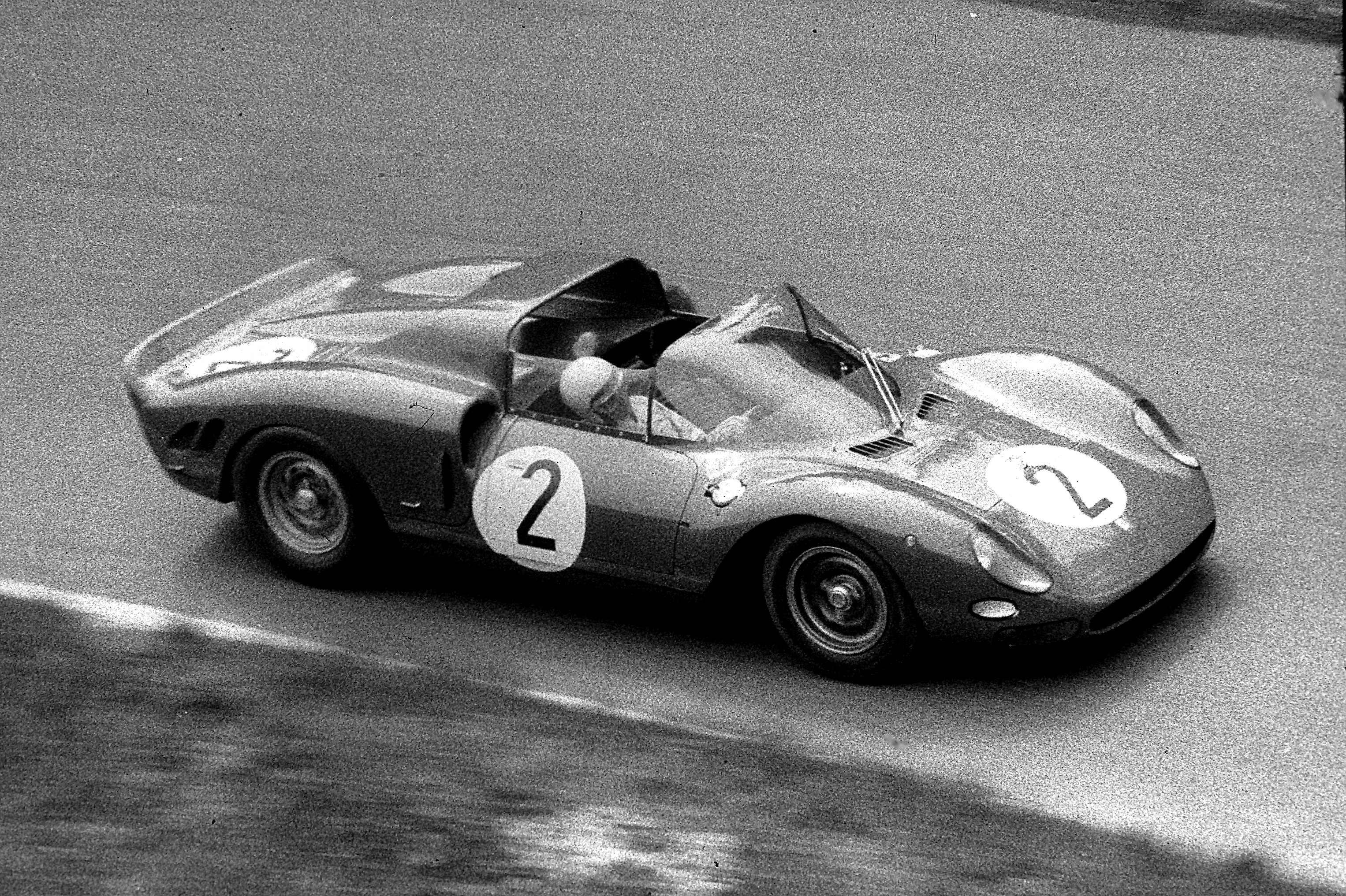
Ferrari 275 P2

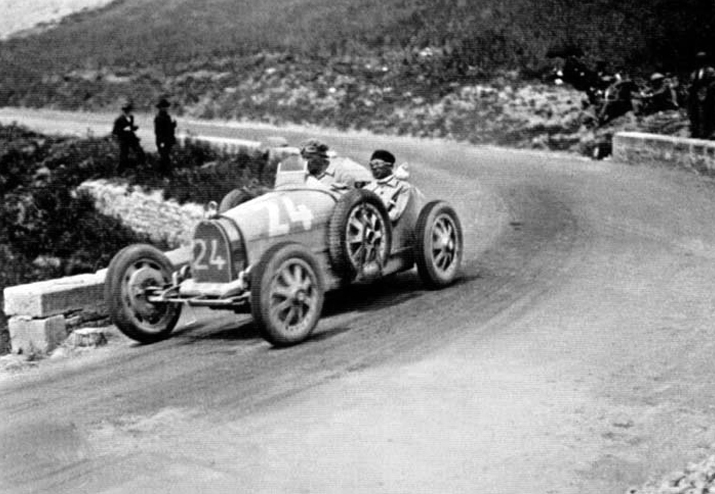
1927-Bugatti T35c driven by Materassi

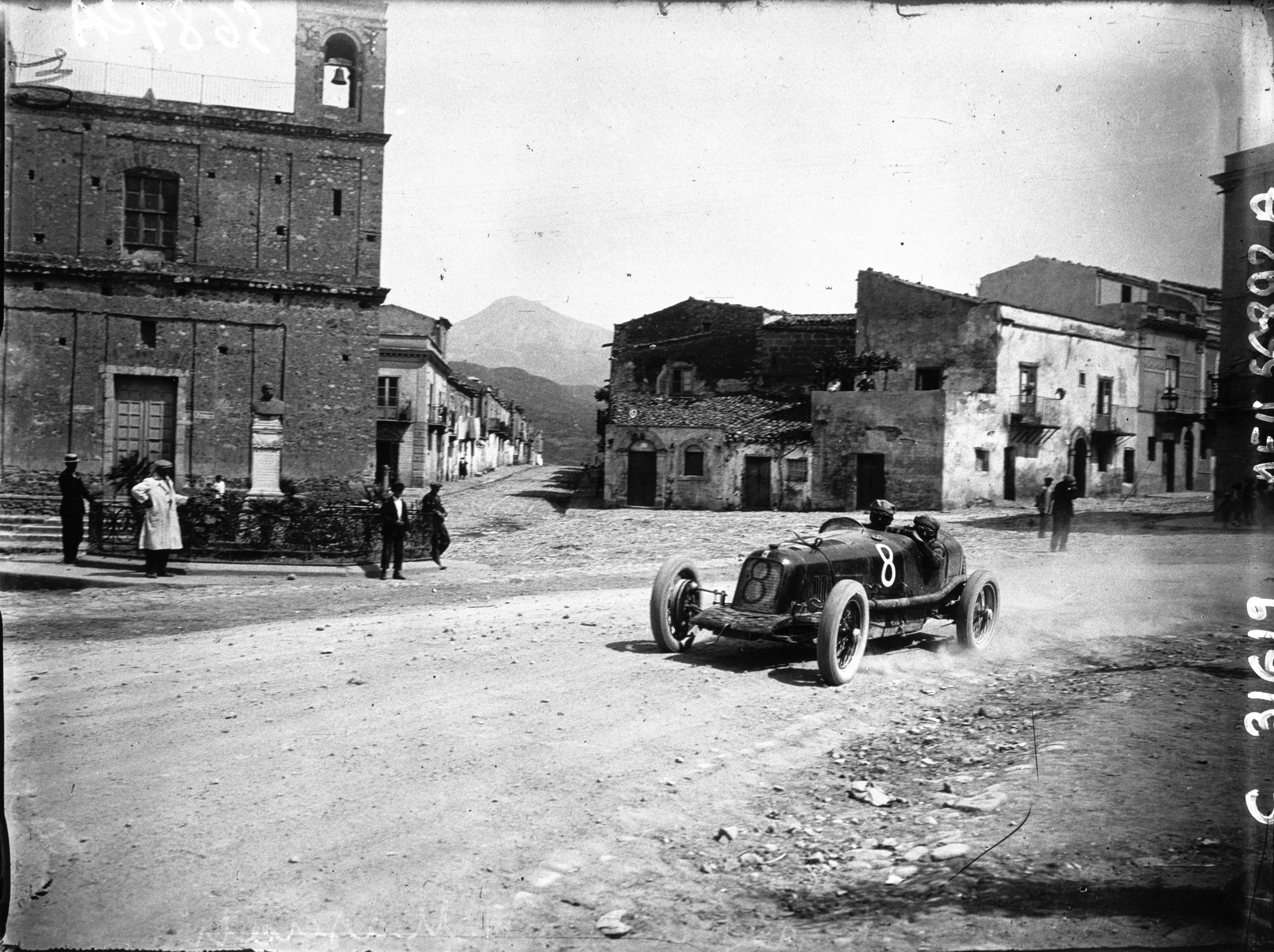
Maserati 26MM driven by Luigi Fagioli in 1928

The list below includes all car manufacturers who have attained a podium. The table does not include the results of the 1957 edition, which was held as a regularity race.

Pos.	Brand	1st place	2nd place	3rd place	Fastest laps
1	(Germany) Porsche	11	9	12	8
2	(Italy) Alfa Romeo	10	13	7	10
3	(Italy) Ferrari	7	6	4	7
4	(Italy) Lancia	5	7	5	4
5	(France) Bugatti	5	4	5	6
6	(Italy) Maserati	4	6	9	4
7	(Germany) Mercedes-Benz	3	2	1	4
8	(Italy) SCAT	3	0	0	0
9	(Italy) Fiat	2	3	3	2
10	(Italy) Nazzaro	2	0	0	0
11	(Italy) Itala	1	2	1	1
12	(Italy) Osella	1	1	1	2
13	(France) Peugeot	1	1	1	1
14	(United Kingdom) Chevron	1	1	0	0
15	(Italy) S.P.A.	1	0	1	1
16	(Italy) Franco	1	0	0	1
17	(Italy) Isotta Fraschini	1	0	0	0
17	(United Kingdom) Frazer-Nash	1	0	0	0
19	(France) Ballot	0	1	1	0
19	(Italy) Cisitalia	0	1	1	0
19	(Italy) De Vecchi	0	1	1	0
22	(Italy) Osca	0	1	0	1
23	(Italy) Aquila Italiana	0	1	0	0
23	(Switzerland) Sigma	0	1	0	0
25	(United Kingdom) Lola	0	0	1	1
26	(Italy) Abarth	0	0	1	0
26	(Italy) AMP	0	0	1	0
26	(France) Berliet	0	0	1	0
26	(France) Darracq	0	0	1	0
26	(Italy) Diatto	0	0	1	0
26	(Austria) Steyr	0	0	1	0
32	(United Kingdom) Aston Martin	0	0	0	1

== See also ==
- List of automobile races in Italy
- Targa Florio Rally
