= Newton-Bennett =

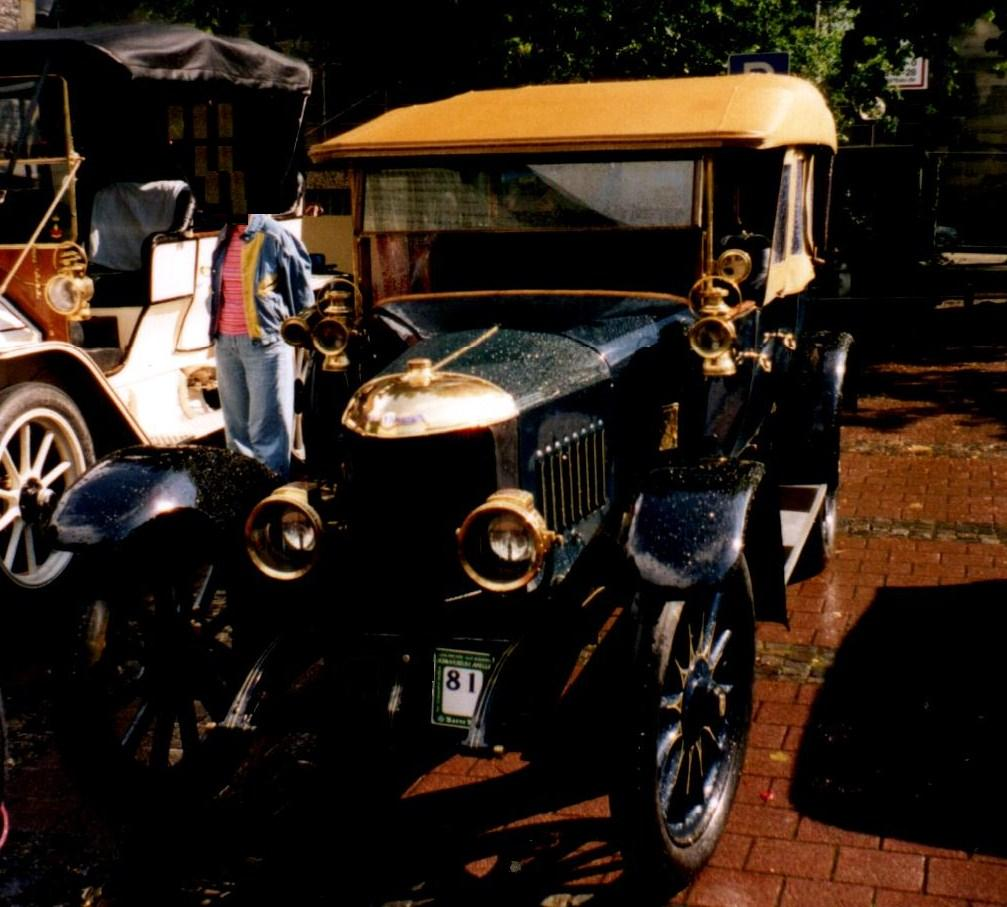
Image of the Car

The Newton-Bennett was a car advertised and sold by a Manchester, England, based company between 1911 and 1925, but made in Italy.

John Bennett was a Manchester car dealer selling locally made Belsize cars and holding agencies for several French makes. This merged with a similar company, Bennett and Carlisle, to become Newton-Bennett. As well as selling cars, they manufactured vehicle parts, and R.O. Harper was employed as works manager. In 1907 they became agents for the Italian SCAT and Harper was sent to Turin to help develop a car specifically to be sold by Newton-Bennett, but this never got beyond a prototype. Instead, they purchased a complete factory, also in Turin, that had made the VALT car. With Harper installed at the new factory, he designed a car which would be badged as a Newton-Bennett.

In 1914, the name changed to Newton but the outbreak of World War I and a large increase in import duties seem to have stopped production. In 1915 the factory was sold to Diatto.

A Newton car was advertised again post war as the Ten, this time with a smaller 1086 cc engine with twin overhead camshafts.

Between 500 and 1000 cars are thought to have been made. At least five cars are thought to survive.

== Newton-Bennett ==
Newton-Bennett

Overview
- Production: 1912-1915

Body and chassis
- Body style: two- or four-seat open. Saloon

Powertrain
- Engine: 2155 cc four-cylinder
- Transmission: 4-speed manual

Dimensions
- Wheelbase: 115 in (2,900 mm)
- Length: 168 in (4,300 mm)

The car had a 2155 cc four-cylinder, water-cooled, side-valve engine This was directly attached to a four-speed gearbox and then by shaft to the rear axle. A compressed air starter was fitted. The steel section chassis had half-elliptic leaf springs all round. The brakes followed the convention of the time, with the hand lever operating the rear drums and the foot pedal a transmission brake. Even though the cars were right hand drive, the gear change lever was on the driver's right side, as was the custom at the time. The car was distinguished by a sharply V-shaped radiator.

The cars were moved to England in chassis form and either supplied as such to buyers or had bodies built by Newton-Bennett. Most were four-seat open tourers but some two-seaters and closed saloons were also made. Some were exported directly from Italy.

== Newton Ten ==
Newton Ten

Overview
- Production: 1923-1925

Body and chassis
- Class: light car

Powertrain
- Engine: 1086 cc four-cylinder twin overhead cam
- Transmission: 4-speed manual

Dimensions
- Wheelbase: 94 in (2,400 mm) or 108 in (2,700 mm)
- Length: 126 in (3,200 mm) or 144 in (3,700 mm)

Chronology
- Successor: none

The car was available in two sizes, a short-wheelbase sports and standard model. The distinctive pre-war radiator design does not seem to have been carried through. The maker of the engine is not known, but it used Bosch electrics and a Claudel-Hobson carburettor. The conventional chassis with half elliptic leaf springs had four-wheel brakes.

It was advertised in chassis form at £395.

== See also ==
- Automobili Nazzaro - imported by Newton-Bennett
