= Antonio Pucci (racing driver) =

Italian racing driver

Antonio Pucci (1923, Petralia Sottana – 15 July 2009) was an Italian racing driver of the 1950s and 1960s. He was an official test driver for Porsche and won the Targa Florio in April 1964 with the English driver Colin Davis.
