= SCAT (automobile) =

Italian automobile manufacturer

S.C.A.T. Società Ceirano Automobili Torino
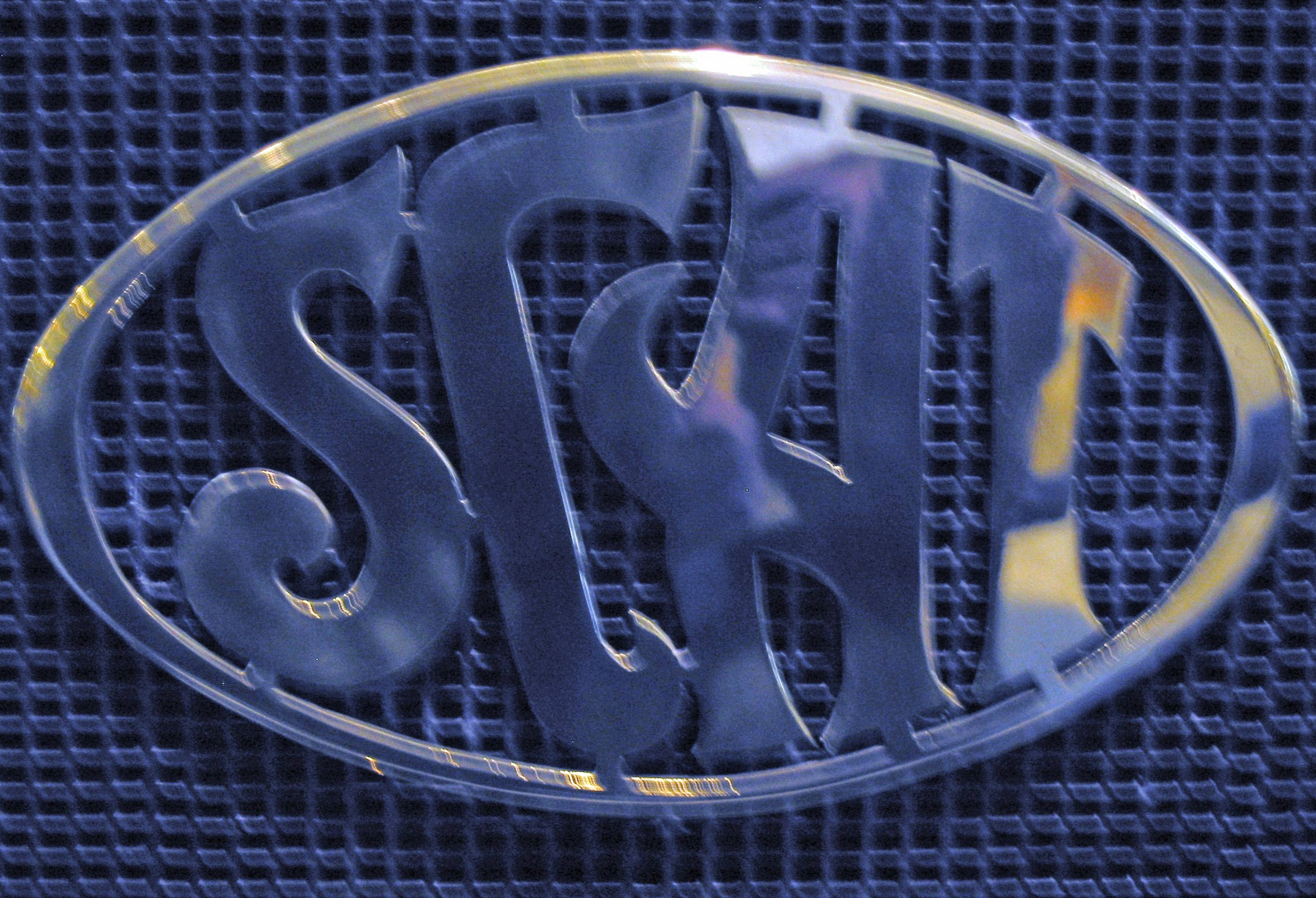
- Industry: Automotive
- Founded: 1906
- Defunct: 1929
- Fate: absorbed by Fiat in 1929, cars produced until 1932
- Headquarters: Turin, Italy
- Key people: Giovanni Battista Ceirano founder
- Products: Automobiles

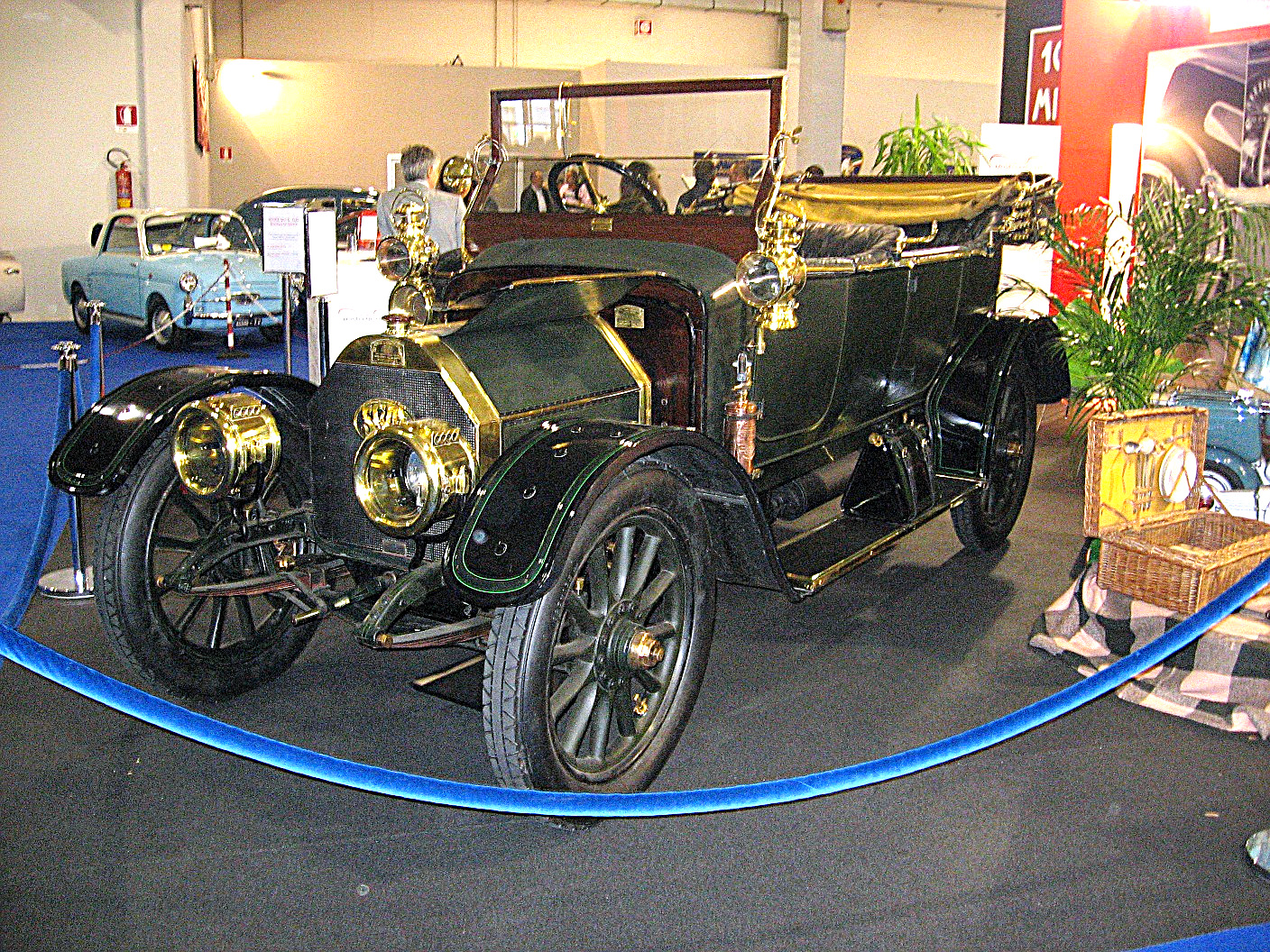
SCAT 15-20HP

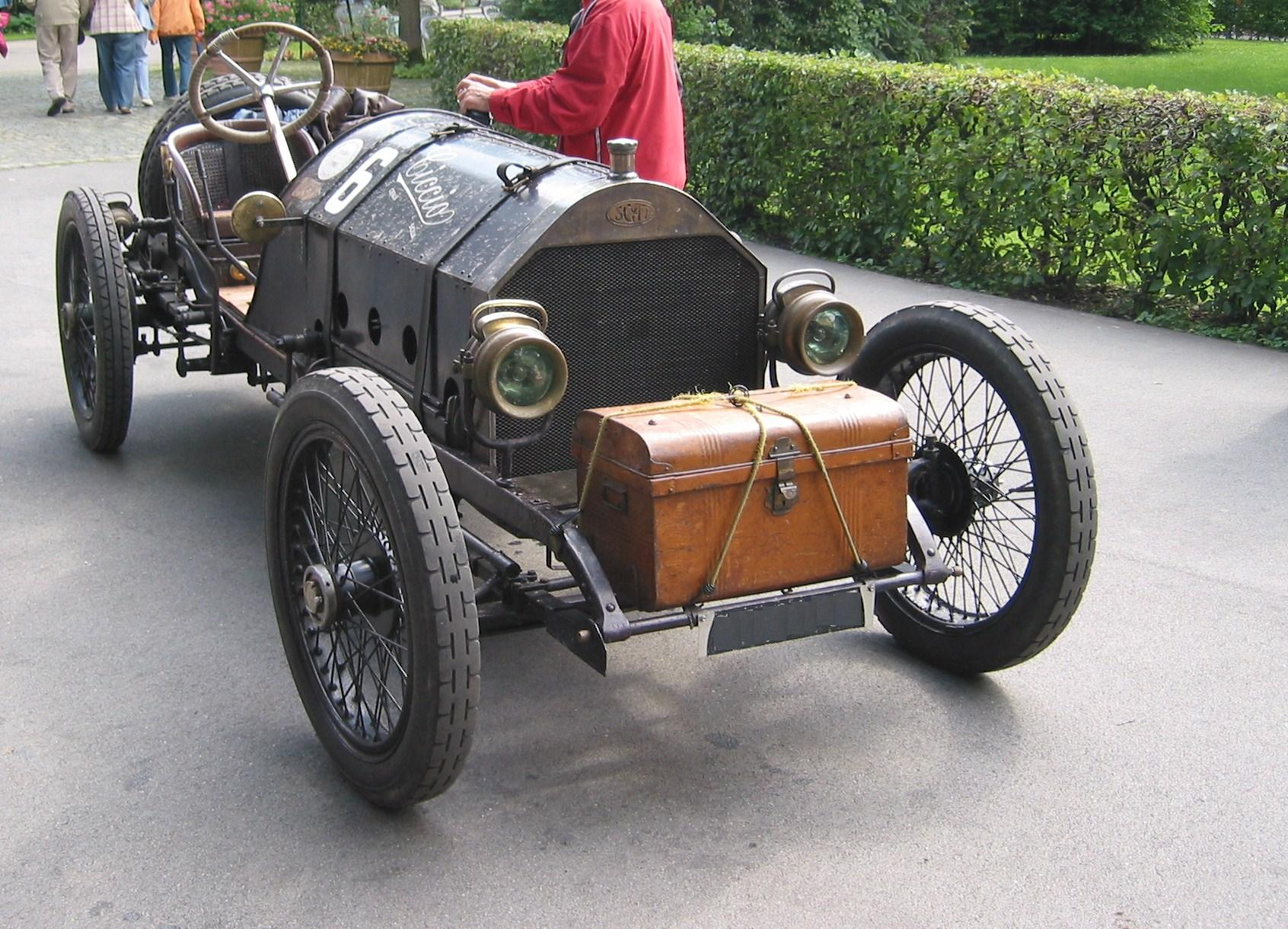
1911 S.C.A.T.

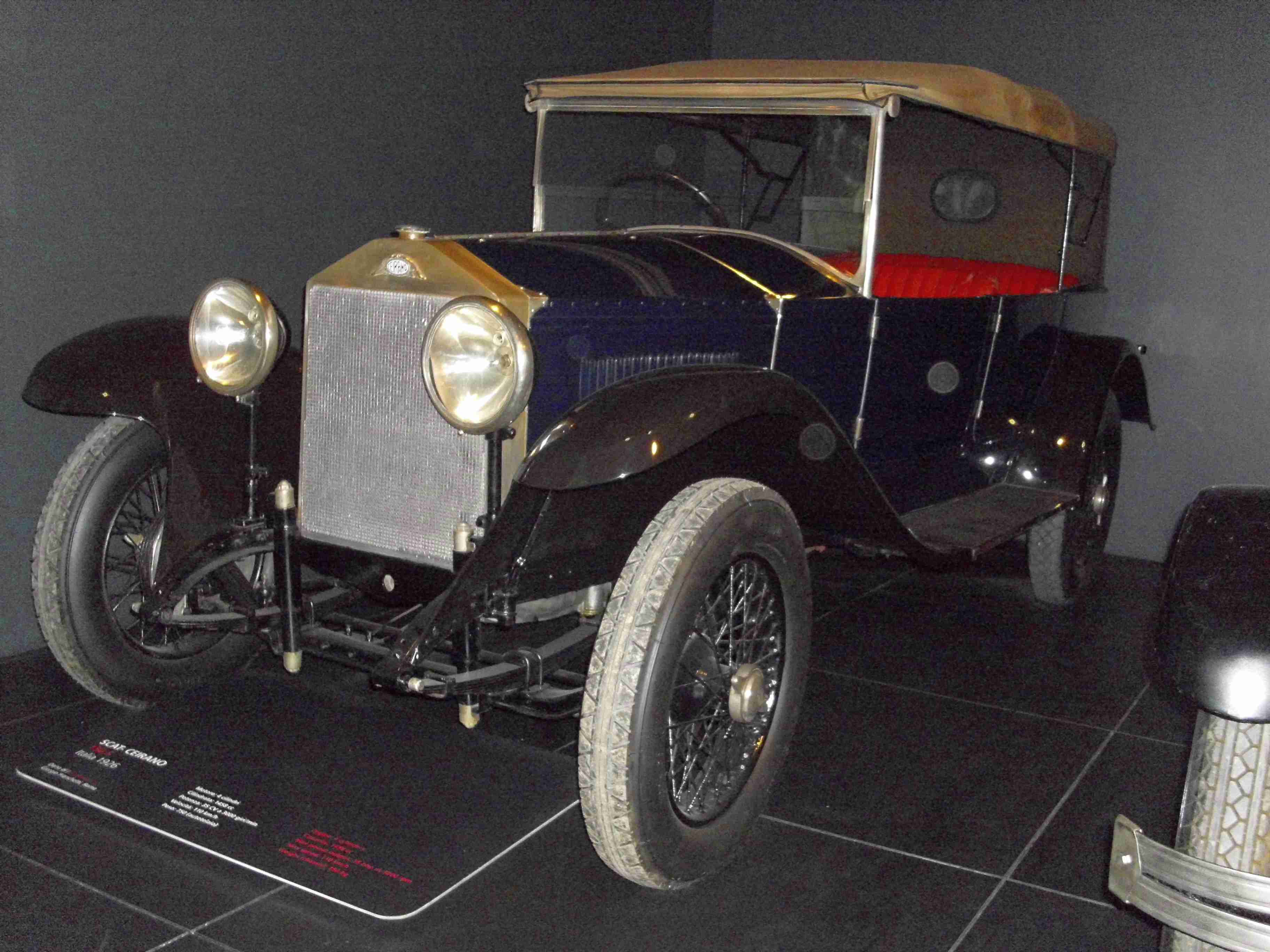
1926 SCAT-Ceirano

The SCAT (Società Ceirano Automobili Torino) was an Italian automobile manufacturer from Turin, founded in 1906 by Giovanni Battista Ceirano.

The company was active from 1906 to 1932 and achieved Targa Florio wins in 1911, 1912 and 1914. The first produced models were the 12 HP, the 16 HP and the 22 HP of 1909.

== Ceirano family background ==
The Ceirano brothers, Giovanni Battista, Giovanni, Ernesto and Matteo, were influential in the founding of the Italian auto industry, being variously responsible for: Ceirano; Welleyes (the technical basis of FIAT); Fratelli Ceirano; Società Torinese Automobili Rapid (STAR/Rapid); SCAT (Società Ceirano Automobili Torino); Itala and SPA (Società Piemontese Automobili). Giovanni's son Giovanni "Ernesto" was also influential, co-founding Ceirano Fabbrica Automobili (aka Giovanni Ceirano Fabbrica Automobili) and Fabrica Anonima Torinese Automobili (FATA).

In 1888, after eight years apprenticeship at his father's watch-making business, Giovanni Battista started building Welleyes bicycles, so named because English names had more sales appeal. In October 1898 Giovanni Battista and Matteo co-founded Ceirano GB & C and started producing the Welleyes motor car in 1899. In July 1899 the plant and patents were sold to Giovanni Agnelli and produced as the first FIATs - the Fiat 4 HP. Giovanni Battista was employed by Fiat as the agent for Italy, but within a year he left to found Fratelli Ceirano & C. which in 1903 became STAR building cars badged as 'Rapid'. In 1904 Matteo Ceirano left Ceirano GB & C to create his own brand - Itala. In 1906 Matteo left Itala to found SPA with chief designer, Alberto Ballacco. In 1906 Giovanni founded SCAT in Turin. In 1919 Giovanni and Giovanni "Ernesto" co-founded Ceirano Fabbrica Automobili (aka Giovanni Ceirano Fabbrica Automobili) and in 1922 they took control of FATA).

== Production ==
SCAT production before World War I:

- 1906 12/16 hp 2,724 cc > 1910 15/20 hp 2,951 cc
- 1907 16/20 hp 3,190 cc
- 1907 22/32 hp 3,770 cc > 1910 22/32 hp 4,398cc > 1912 25/35 hp 4,712 cc
- 1912 60/75 hp 6,285 cc
- 1914 12/18 hp 2,120 cc
- 1915 18/30 hp 3,563 cc
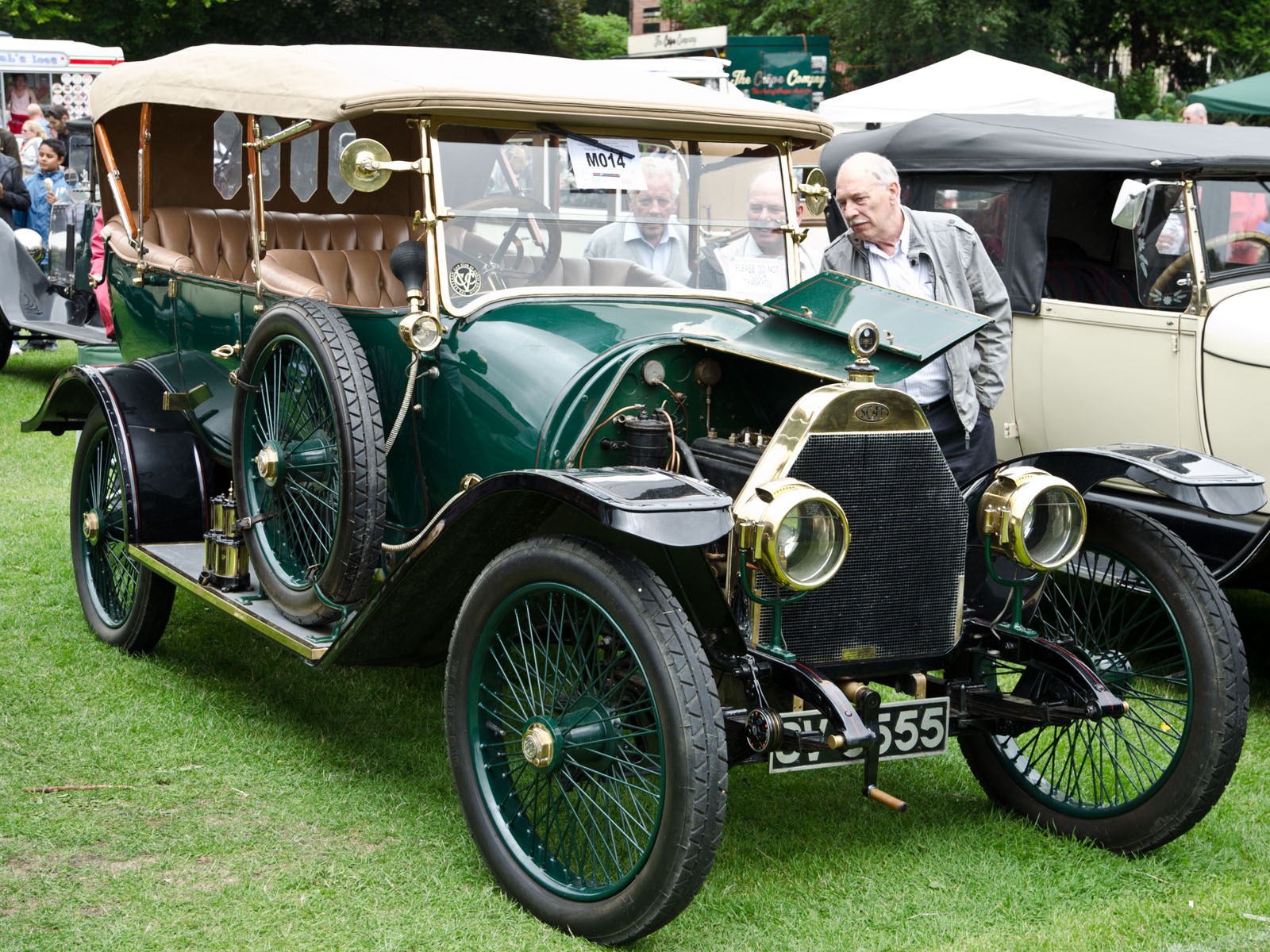
1913 torpedo

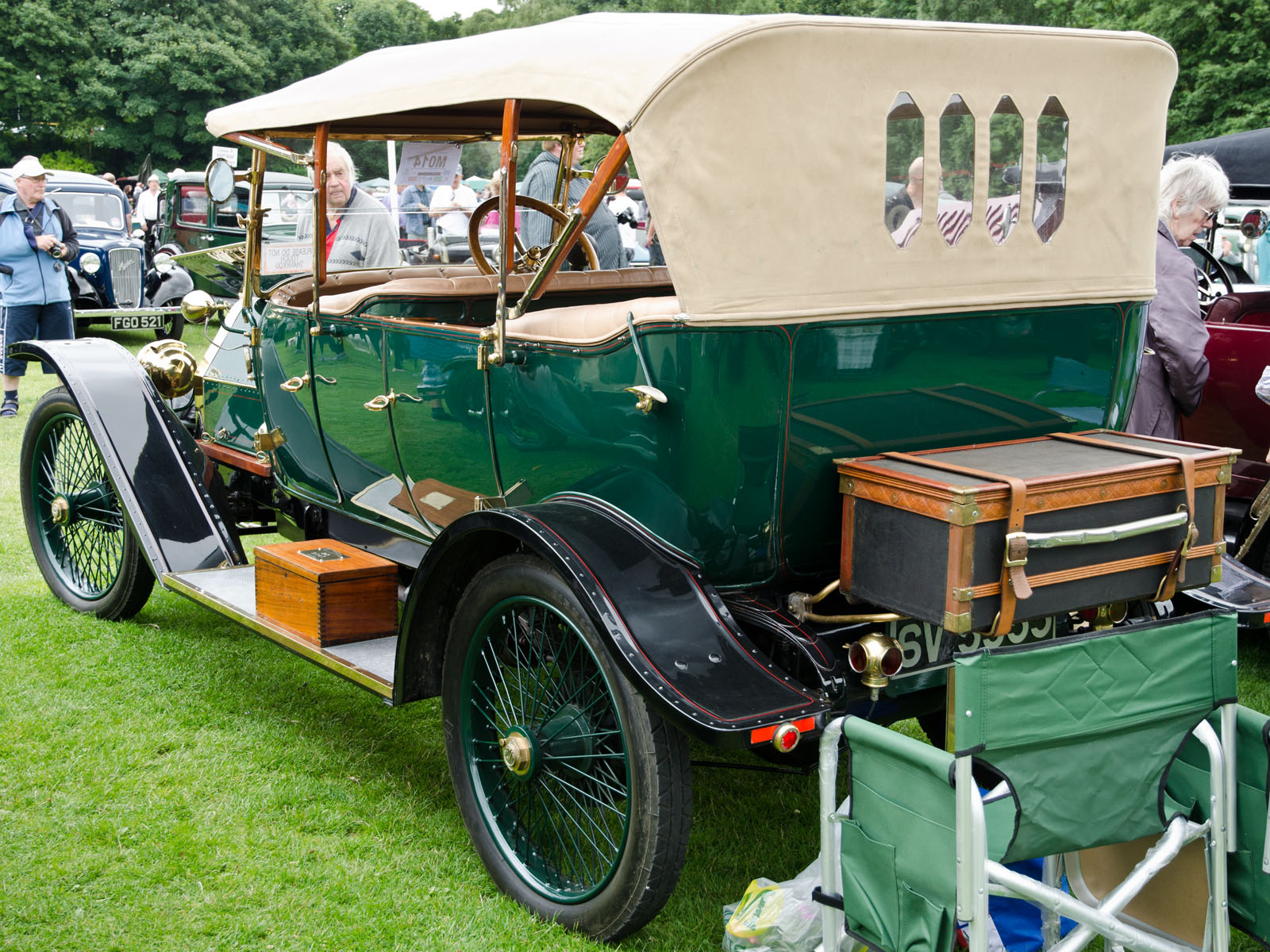

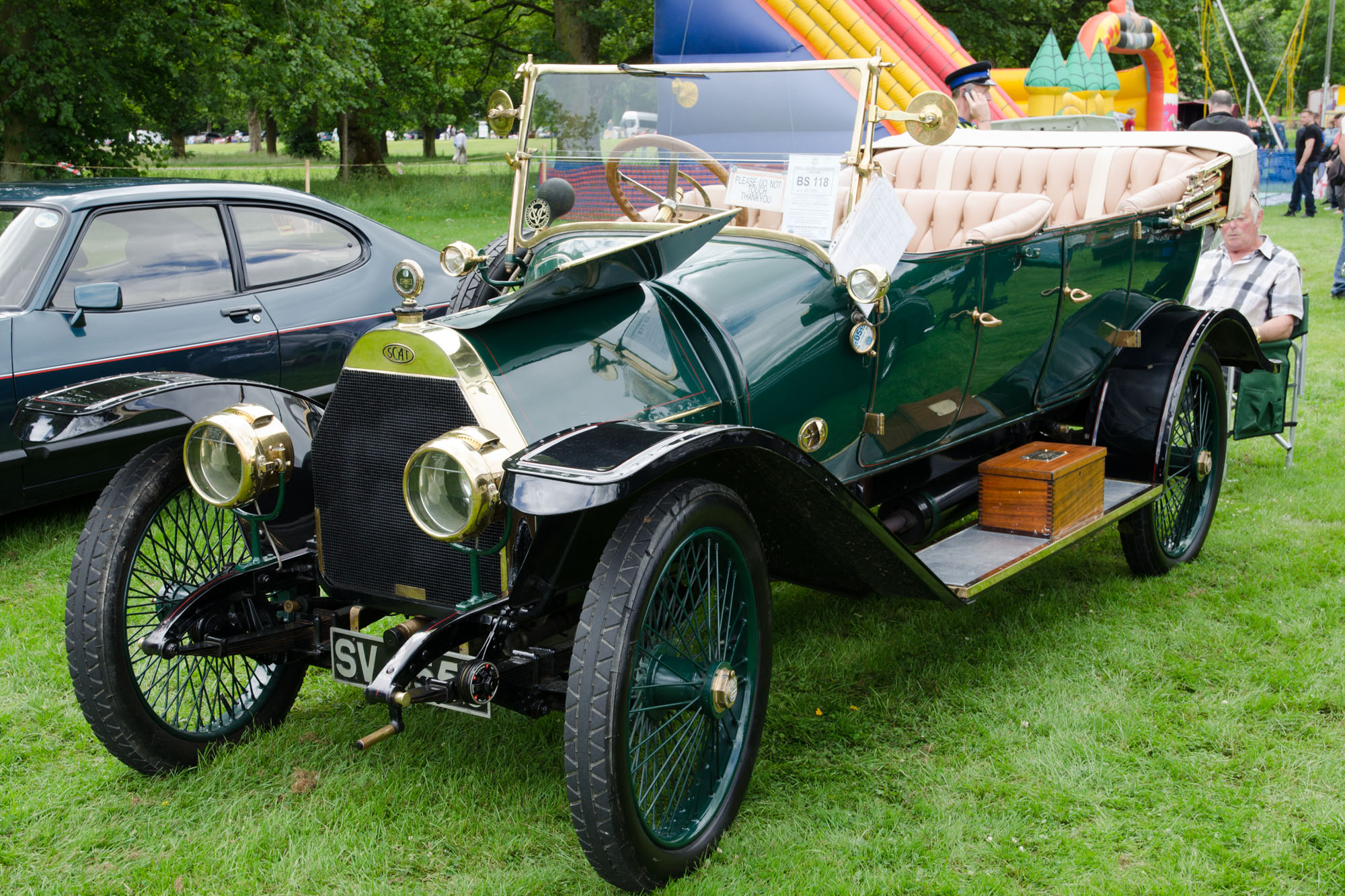

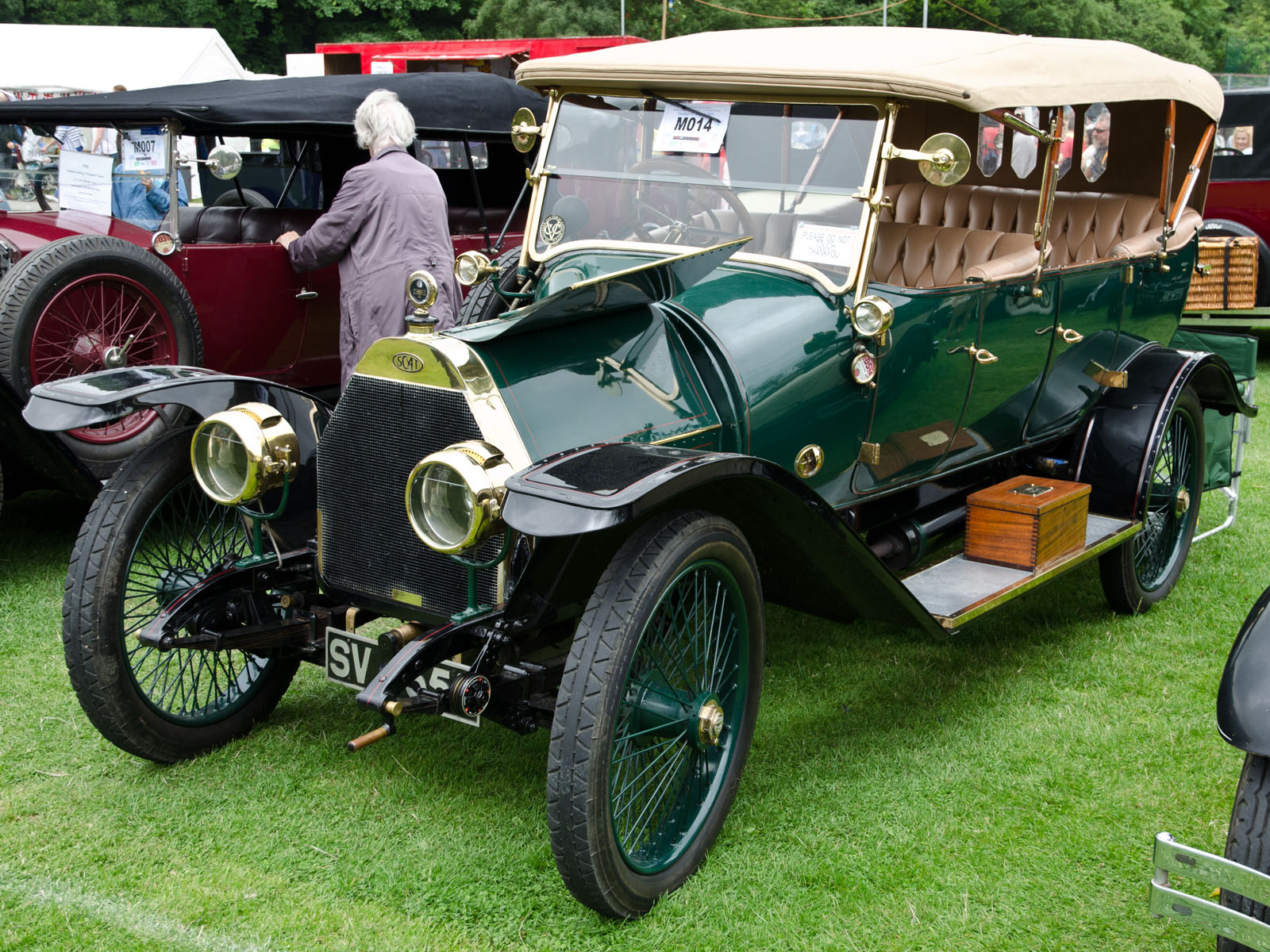

== Targa Florio ==
=== 1911 ===
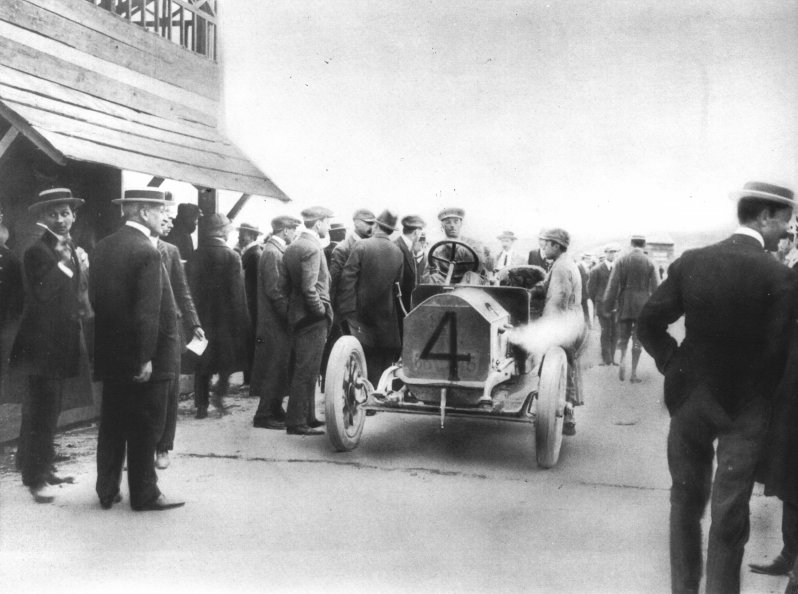
Ernesto Ceirano wins the 1911 Targa Florio in a Scat 22/32.

In 1911, Giovanni's brother Ernesto Ceirano won the Targa Florio driving the SCAT he completed the 3 laps of the Grande Circuit of the Targa Florio, covering the 446-kilometre (277 mi) in 9 hours 32 minutes 22 seconds, an average speed of 46.8 km/h.

=== 1912 ===
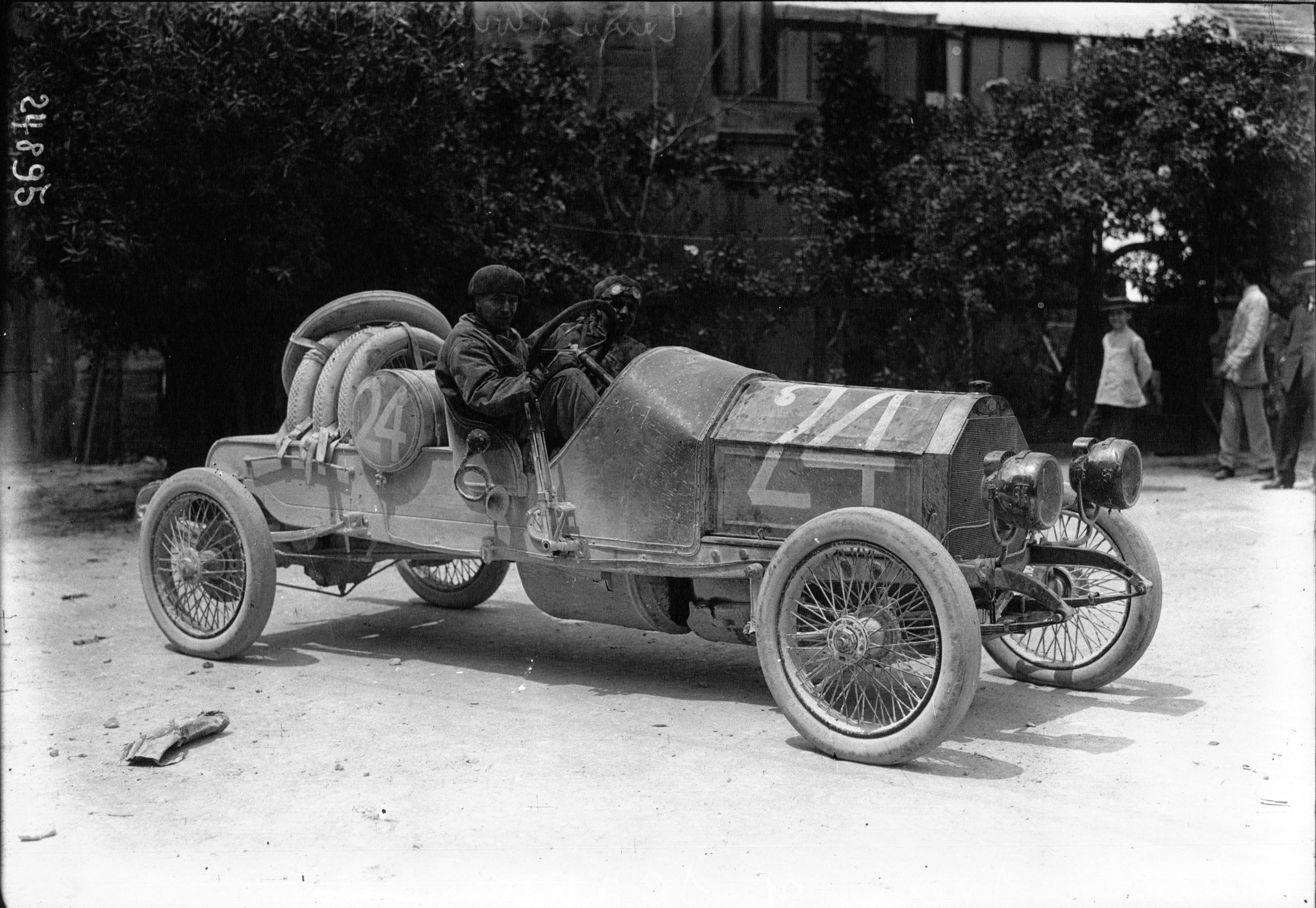
Cyril Snipe at the 1912 Targa Florio

British driver Cyril Snipe won the 1912 Targa Florio (Giro di Sicilia) on 25 and 26 May, driving a SCAT 25/35 with his co-driver Pedrini. They completed the 965 kilometre course around the island of Sicily in 24 hours 37 minutes 39 seconds, defeating a field of 26 cars which included Lancia, Isotta Fraschini, Fiat and A.L.F.A. The race passed through Palermo, Messina, Catania, Syracuse, Ragusa, Gela, Agrigento, Marsala, Trapani, and back to Palermo.

=== 1913 ===
Snipe drove a SCAT again in the 1913 Targa Florio race, but failed to finish.

=== 1914 ===
In 1914, Ernesto Ceirano drove a SCAT 22/32 to his second victory in the Targa Florio, completing a single 979 km lap of the island in 16 hours 51 minutes 31 seconds at an average speed of 58.07 km/h.

== Models ==
In the year 1911, 350 vehicles were manufactured.

19 models were produced by SCAT:

Start	End	Name	Engine	Cylinders	Capacity	Horsepower	Torque
1906	1909	SCAT 12-16 HP	Multi-block	Straight-four engine	2,724 cm^{3} (85 x 120)	12 hp (12 PS; 8.9 kW)	45 lb⋅ft (61 N⋅m)
1907	1909	SCAT 16-20 HP	Multi-block	Straight-four engine	3,190 cm^{3} (92 x 120)	16 hp (16 PS; 12 kW)	49.6 lb⋅ft (67.2 N⋅m)
1907	1909	SCAT 22-32 HP	Multi-block	Straight-four engine	3,770 cm^{3} (100 x 120)	22 hp (22 PS; 16 kW)	66 lb⋅ft (89 N⋅m)
1910	1911	SCAT 22-32 HP	Multi-block	Straight-four engine	4,398 cm^{3} (100 x 140)	22 hp (22 PS; 16 kW)	78 lb⋅ft (106 N⋅m)
1912	1914	SCAT 15-20 HP	Mono-block	Straight-four engine	2,951 cm^{3} (85 x 130)	15 hp (15 PS; 11 kW)	50 lb⋅ft (68 N⋅m)
1910	1911	SCAT 15-20 HP	Mono-block	Straight-four engine	2,724 cm^{3} (85 x 120)	15 hp (15 PS; 11 kW)	48.4 lb⋅ft (65.6 N⋅m)
1912	1920	SCAT 25-35 HP	Mono-block	Straight-four engine	4,712 cm^{3} (100 x 150)	25 hp (25 PS; 19 kW)	89 lb⋅ft (121 N⋅m)
1912	1915	SCAT 60-75 HP	Mono-block	Straight-four engine	6,284 cm^{3} (100 x 200)	60 hp (61 PS; 45 kW)	112 lb⋅ft (152 N⋅m)
1914	1920	SCAT 12-18 HP	Mono-block	Straight-four engine	2,120 cm^{3} (75 x 120)	12 hp (12 PS; 8.9 kW)	33.4 lb⋅ft (45.3 N⋅m)
1915	1916	SCAT 18-30 HP	Mono-block	Straight-four engine	3,563 cm^{3} (90 x 140)	18 hp (18 PS; 13 kW)	72 lb⋅ft (98 N⋅m)
1921	1921	SCAT 18-25 HP	Mono-block	Straight-four engine	2,120 cm^{3} (75 x 120)	18 hp (18 PS; 13 kW)	48 lb⋅ft (65 N⋅m)
1922	1922	SCAT 18-25 HP	Mono-block	Straight-four engine	2,220 cm^{3} (76 x 125)	18 hp (18 PS; 13 kW)	56 lb⋅ft (76 N⋅m)
1922	1922	SCAT 18-25 HP	Mono-block	Straight-four engine	2,218 cm^{3} (64 x 115)	18 hp (18 PS; 13 kW)	52 lb⋅ft (71 N⋅m)
1921	1921	SCAT 30-40 HP	Mono-block	Straight-four engine	4,712 cm^{3} (100 x 150)	30 hp (30 PS; 22 kW)	84 lb⋅ft (114 N⋅m)
1921	1921	SCAT 120 HP Corsa	Mono-block	Straight-four engine	9,236 cm^{3} (140 x 150)	120 hp (120 PS; 89 kW)	332 lb⋅ft (450 N⋅m)
1922	1922	SCAT 12-16 HP	Mono-block	Straight-four engine	1,551 cm^{3} (67 x 110)	12 hp (12 PS; 8.9 kW)	25 lb⋅ft (34 N⋅m)
1922	1922	SCAT 20-30 HP	Mono-block	Straight-four engine	2,951 cm^{3} (85 x 130)	20 hp (20 PS; 15 kW)	50 lb⋅ft (68 N⋅m)
1924	1928	SCAT Ceirano N 150 ("Ceiranina")	Mono-block	Straight-four engine	1,458 cm^{3} (65 x 110)	35 hp (35 PS; 26 kW)	34 lb⋅ft (46 N⋅m)
1924	1931	SCAT Ceirano S 150	Mono-block	Straight-four engine	1,458 cm^{3} (65 x 110)	41 hp (42 PS; 31 kW)	45 lb⋅ft (61 N⋅m)
1926	1928	SCAT Ceirano 250	Mono-block	Straight-four engine	2,297 cm^{3} (75 x 130)	47 hp (48 PS; 35 kW)	49 lb⋅ft (66 N⋅m)

== See also ==
- List of Italian companies
- List of automobile companies founded by the Ceirano brothers
