= List of Fiat vehicles =

Italian automobile manufacturer Fiat has produced numerous vehicles since its inception in 1899.

== Current models ==
Vehicles exclusive to Latin America

Body style	Model			Current generation			Vehicle description
Body style	Image	Name(s)	Introduction (cal. year)	Model code	Introduction (cal. year)	Update (facelift)	Vehicle description
Quadricycle		Topolino	2023		2023	–	Quadricycle, rebadged Citroën Ami.
Hatchback		500e (332)	2020	332	2020	–	A-segment battery-electric city car.
Hatchback		Argo	2018	358	2018	–	B-segment/subcompact hatchback mainly marketed in Latin America.
Hatchback		Grande Panda/Argo X	2024		2024	–	B-segment hatchback mainly marketed in Europe, it is also marketed as Argo X in Brazil.
Hatchback		Mobi	2016	341	2016	–	A-segment hatchback city car mainly marketed in Latin America.
Hatchback		Panda	1980	319	2011	–	A-segment hatchback city car mainly marketed in Europe.
Sedan		Cronos	2018	358S	2018	–	Sedan version of the Argo mainly marketed in Latin America.
Crossover SUV		600	2023	F364	2023	-	Subcompact crossover SUV. Battery electric version is available as the 600e.
Crossover SUV		Fastback	2022	376	2022	-	Subcompact coupe crossover SUV for the South American market based on the Pulse and Argo.
Crossover SUV		Grizzly / Grizzly Fastback	2026		2026	-	Subcompact crossover/coupe crossover SUV for the Europe market.
Crossover SUV		Pulse	2021	363	2021	–	Subcompact crossover SUV for the South American market based on the Argo.
MPV/ minivan		Doblò MPV/E-Doblò MPV/Qubo L	2000		2023	-	Passenger version of the Fiat Doblo. Also marketed as the Fiat Qubo L or the Doblo Panorama.
MPV/ minivan		Ulysse	1994 (nameplate)		2002	2022	Passenger version of the Fiat Scudo.
Van		Doblò	2000		2022	2024	Panel van, a rebadged Citroën Berlingo. Battery electric version is available as the E-Doblò.
Van		Ducato	1981	250	2006	2024	Light commercial van. Third generation is marketed by Ram as the ProMaster since 2013.
Van		Fiorino (327)	1977	327	2013	-	Panel van based on the Fiat Uno, only sold in Latin American countries.
Van		Scudo	1996		2007	2024	Panel van, a rebadged Citroën Jumpy.
Pickup		Scudo Pick Up	2016		2016	2024	Pickup version of the Scudo.
Pickup		Ducato Flatbed	1981		2006	2014	Pickup version of the Ducato.
Pickup		Strada	1996	281	2020	–	Four-door compact pickup mainly marketed in Latin America.
Pickup		Toro	2016	226	2016	2022	Four-door compact pickup larger than the Strada mainly marketed in Latin America.
Pickup		Titano	2023		2023	-	Mid-size pickup truck marketed in South America and Algeria, rebadged Peugeot Landtrek.
Three-wheeler		Tris	2025		2025	–	Three-wheeler mainly marketed in Africa and the Middle East.

=== Abarth ===
Body style	Model			Current generation			Vehicle description	
Body style	Image	Name(s)	Introduction (cal. year)	Model code	Introduction (cal. year)	Update/facelift	Vehicle description	
Body style	Hatchback		500e	2023		2023	–	High-performance hot hatch version of the 500e.
Body style	Crossover/SUV		Pulse	2022		2022	–	High-performance version of the Pulse.
Body style	Crossover/SUV		Fastback	2023		2023	–	High-performance version of the Fastback.
Body style	Crossover/SUV		600e	2024		2024	–	High-performance version of the new Fiat 600 Crossover.

== 1980–2021 ==
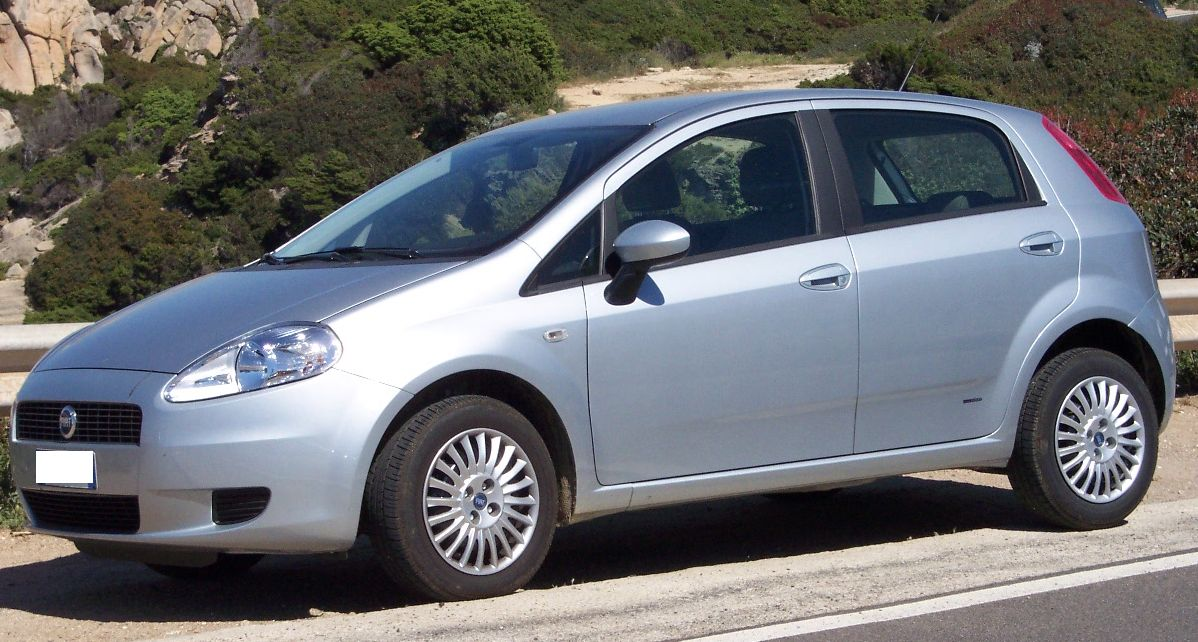
Grande Punto

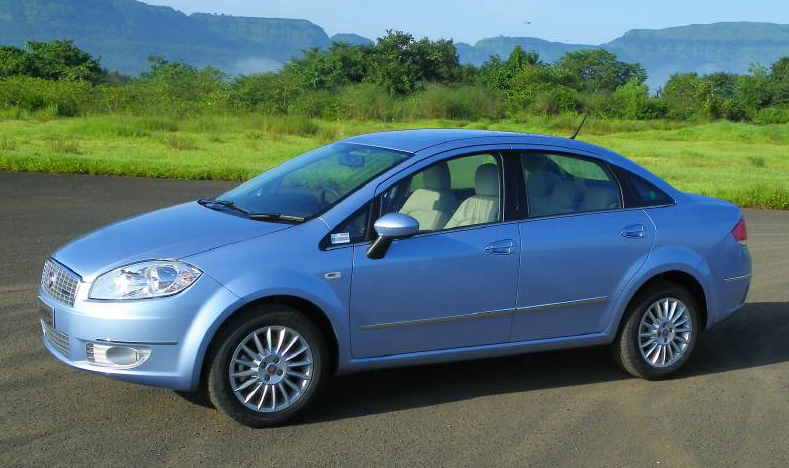
Fiat Linea

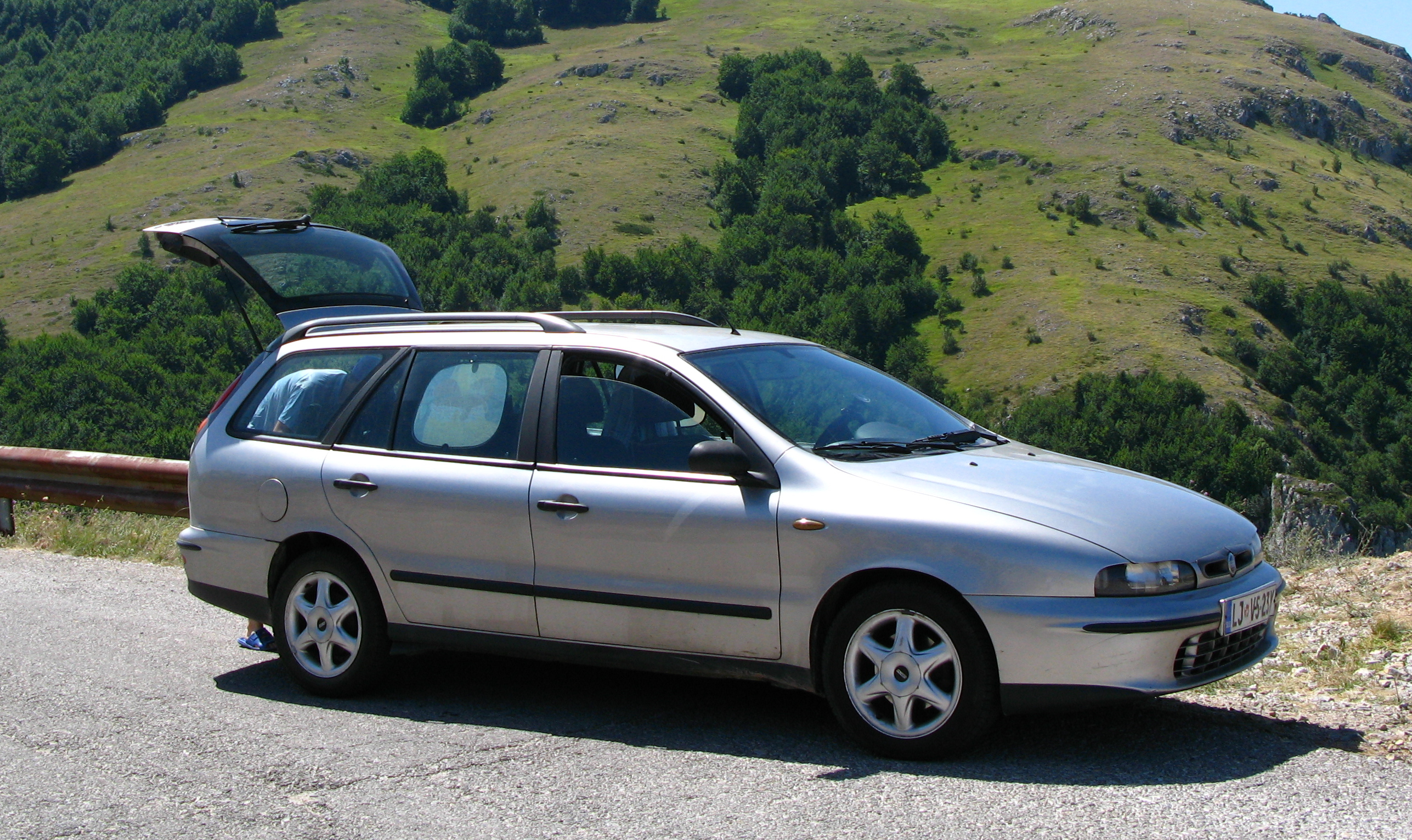
Fiat Marea Weekend JTD

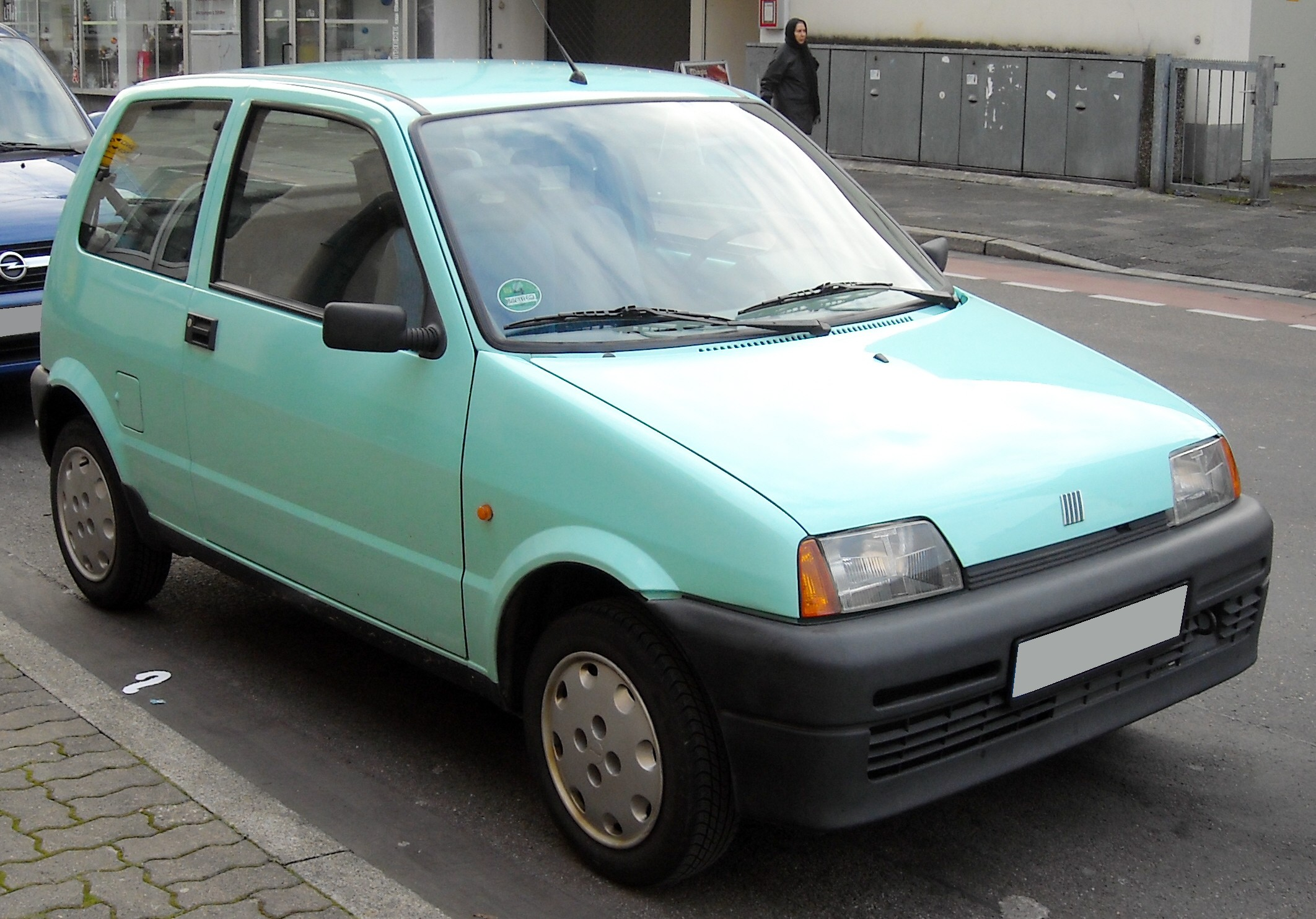
Fiat Cinquecento

- 2009–2018 Fiat 500 - Americas
- 2007–2024 Fiat 500
- 2014–2024 Fiat 500X
- 2016–2020 Fiat 500X - South America
- 2012–2022 Fiat 500L
- 2017–2020 Fiat 124 Spider
- 2002–2012 Fiat Albea
- 1981–1985 Fiat Argenta
- 1995–2005 Fiat Barchetta
- 2007–2014 Fiat Bravo
- 1995–2001 Fiat Bravo/Brava
- 2000–2002 Fiat Brava - South America
- 1991–1998 Fiat Cinquecento
- 1980–1987 Fiat City - South America
- 1993–2000 Fiat Coupé
- 1998–1999 Fiat Coupé - South America
- 1985–1996 Fiat Croma
- 2005–2010 Fiat Croma II
- 1985–2000 Fiat Duna/Prêmio/Elba
- 1997–2016 Fiat Ducato II - South America
- 2011–2022 Fiat Doblò Work Up
- 1977–1988 Fiat Fiorino I - South America
- 1988–2013 Fiat Fiorino II - South America
- 1988–1998 Fiat Fiorino pickup - South America
- 2011–2017 Fiat Freemont - South America
- 2007–2024 Fiat Fiorino - Europe
- 2012–2018 Fiat Grand Siena
- 2012–2018 Fiat Grand Siena - South America
- 2005–2018 Fiat Grande Punto
- 2003–2012 Fiat Idea
- 2005–2016 Fiat Idea - South America
- 2007–2016 Fiat Linea
- 1996–2002 Fiat Marea
- 1998–2010 Fiat Multipla
- 1983–1985 Fiat Oggi
- 2012–2017 Fiat Ottimo
- 1996–2016 Fiat Palio
- 2016–2019 Fiat Fullback
- 1997–2019 Fiat Palio Weekend / Weekend - South America
- 1986–2003 Fiat Panda II
- 1980–1986 Fiat Panorama
- 1993–2018 Fiat Punto
- 2007–2024 Fiat Qubo
- 1983–1990 Fiat Regata
- 2005–2014 Fiat Sedici
- 1997–2010 Fiat Seicento
- 1996–2016 Fiat Scudo
- 1996–2016 Fiat Siena
- 2001–2007 Fiat Stilo
- 1997–2020 Fiat Strada I - South America
- 1990–1997 Fiat Tempra
- 1988–1995 Fiat Tipo
- 2015–2026 Fiat Tipo (2015)
- 2016–2020 Fiat Talento
- 1994–2010 Fiat Ulysse
- 1983–1995 Fiat Uno
- 2010–2021 Fiat Uno II - South America
- 1984–2014 Fiat Uno/Mille - South America
- 2012–2017 Fiat Viaggio

== 1950–1979 ==
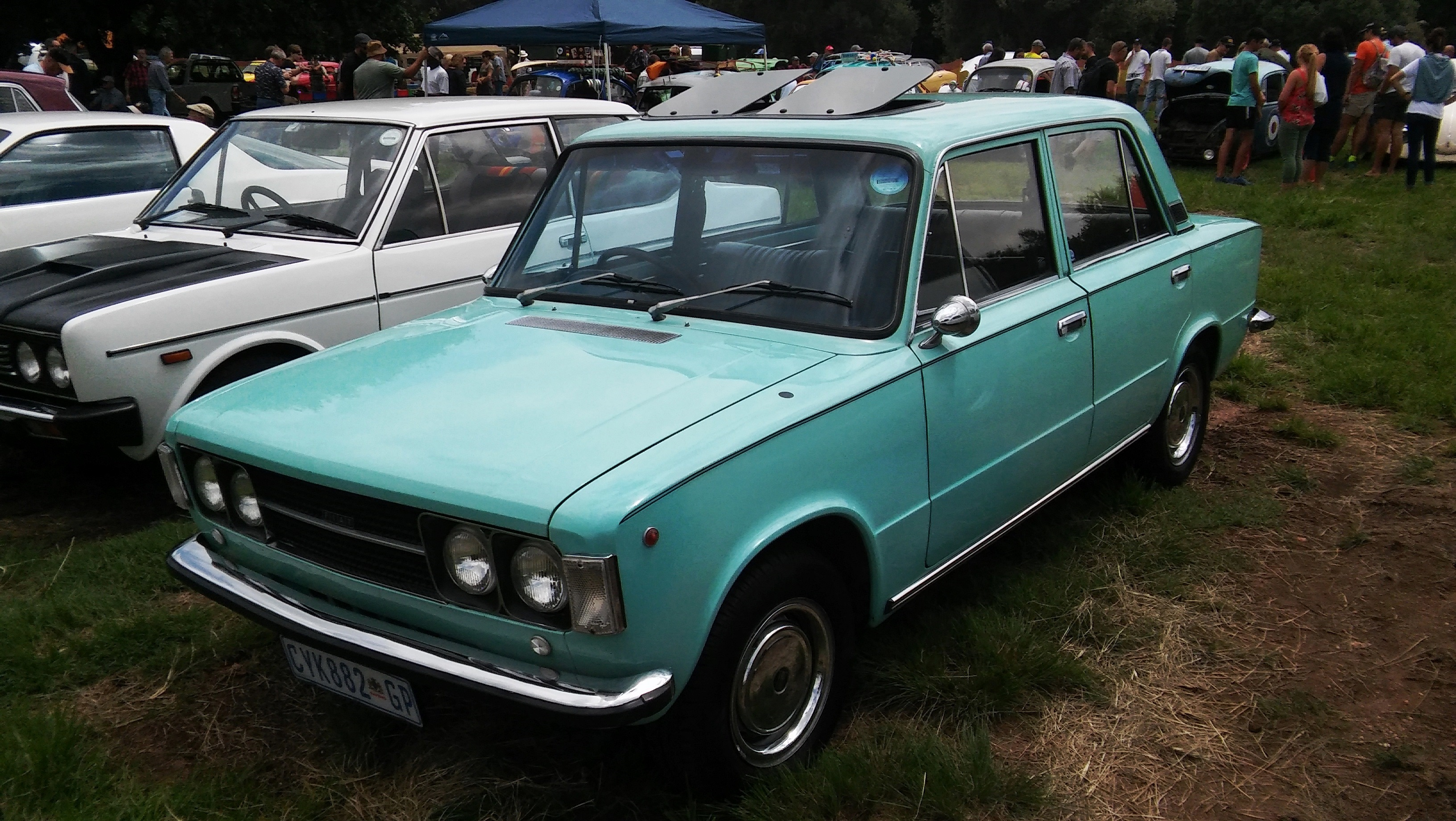
Fiat 124 Special T 1600

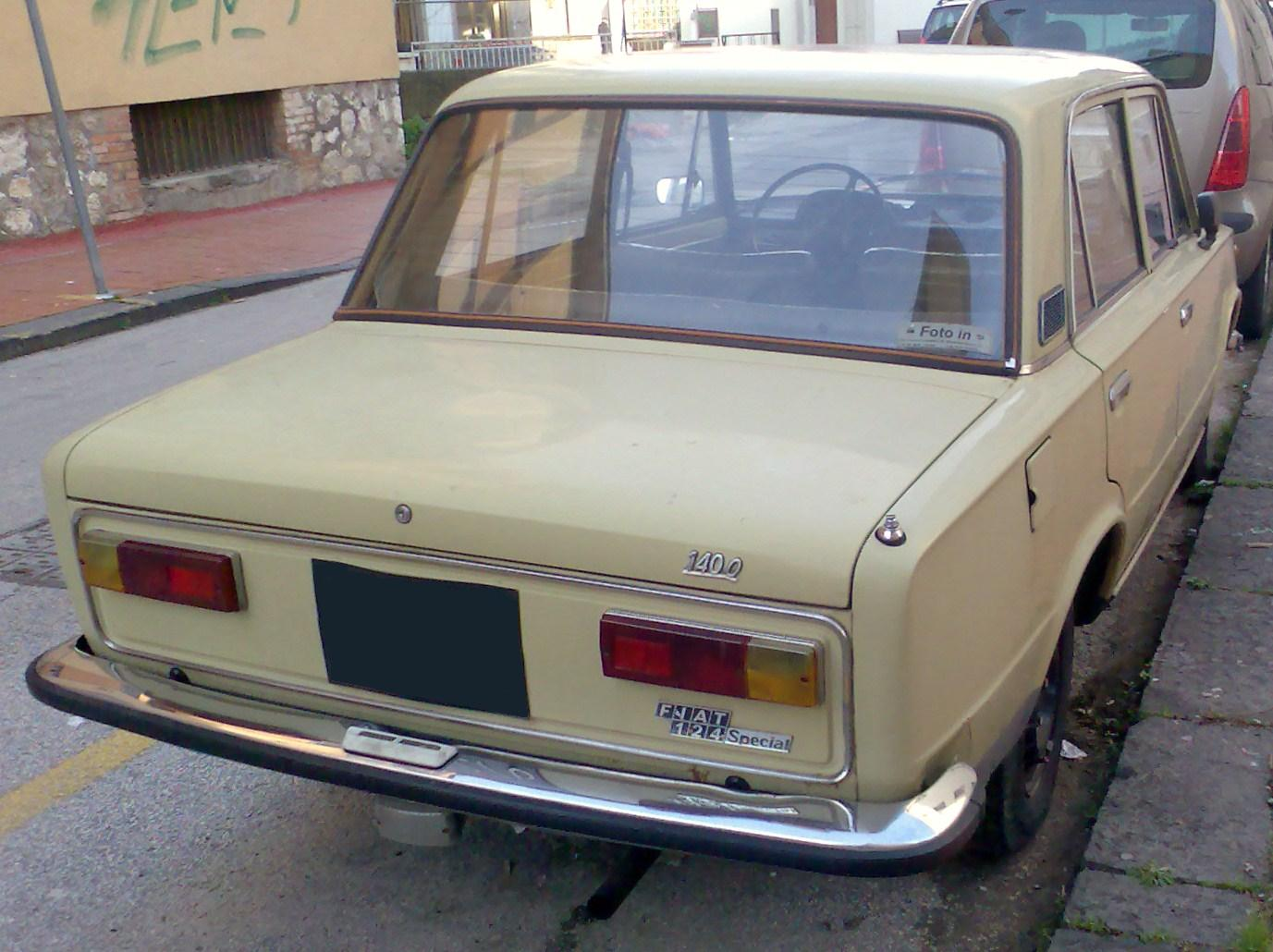
Fiat 124 Special 1400

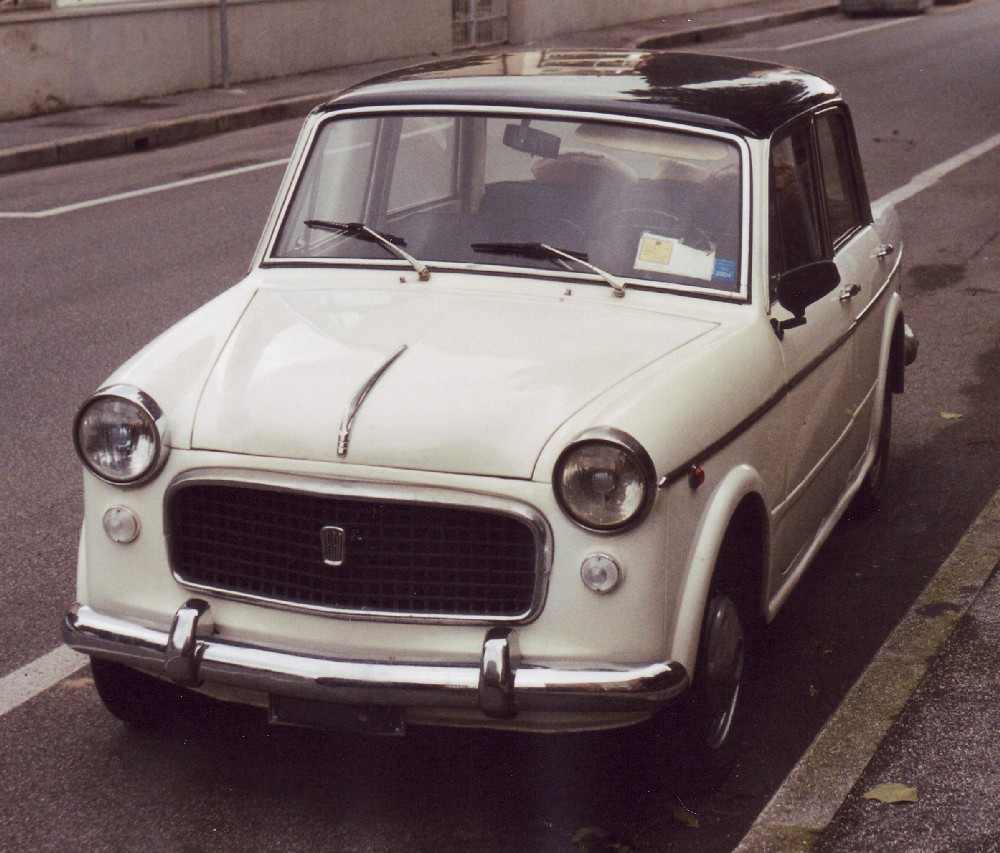
Fiat 1100/103

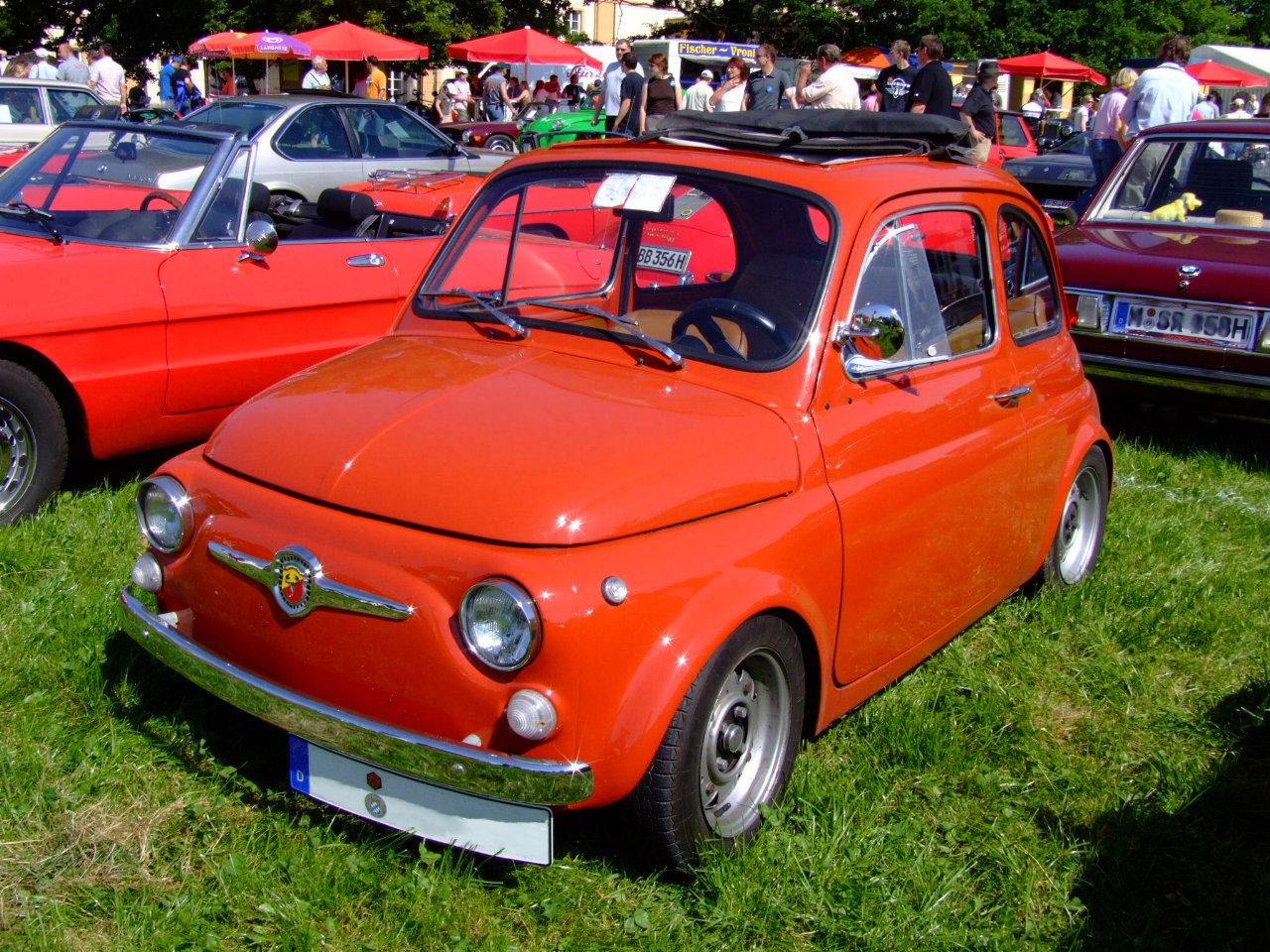
Fiat 500

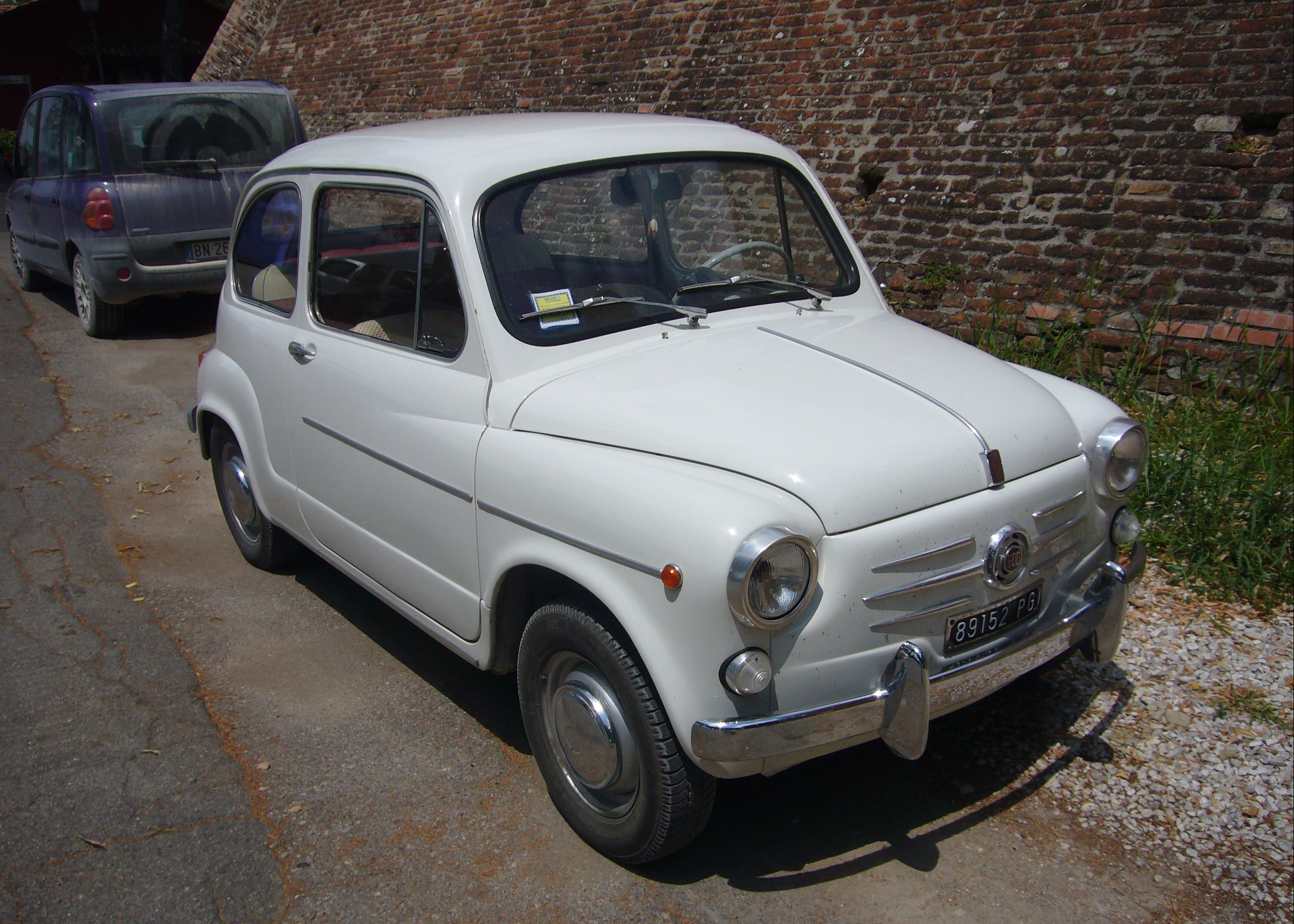
Fiat 600 D

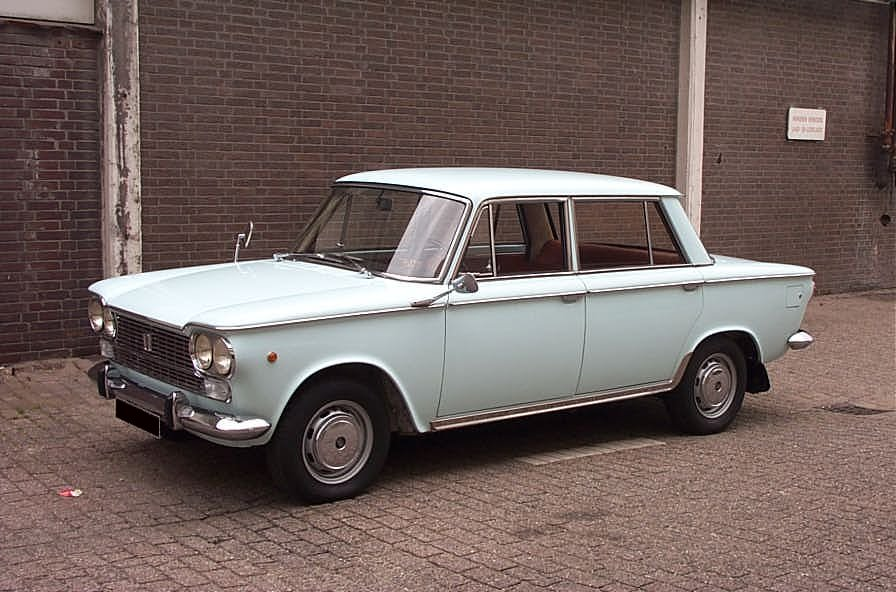
Fiat 1500

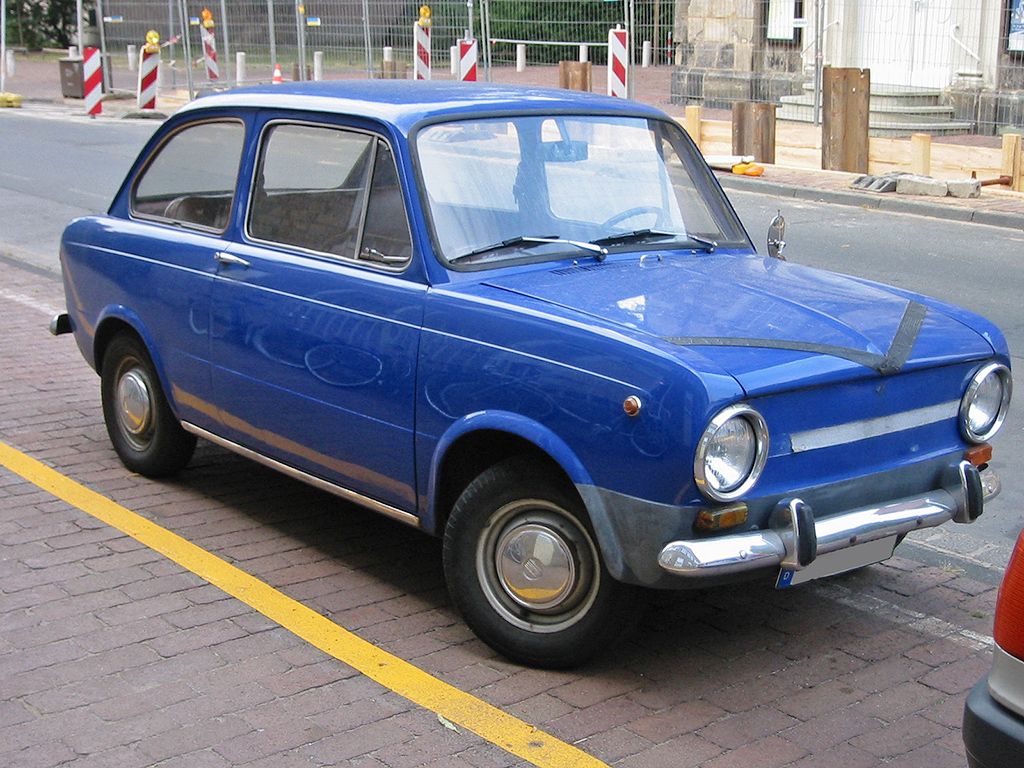
Fiat 850

- 1950–1958 Fiat 1400
- 1951–1973 Fiat Campagnola
- 1952–1954 Fiat 8V
- 1952–1958 Fiat 1900
- 1953–1969 Fiat 1100/103
- 1955–1969 Fiat 600
- 1957–1961 Fiat 1200
- 1957–1975 Fiat 500
- 1959–1966 Fiat 1200/1500/1600 Cabriolet
- 1959–1968 Fiat 1800
- 1959–1961 Fiat 2100
- 1961–1967 Fiat 1300
- 1961–1967 Fiat 1500
- 1961–1969 Fiat 2300
- 1964–1973 Fiat 850
- 1966–1974 Fiat 124
- 1967–1975 Fiat 124 Sport Coupé
- 1966–1985 Fiat 124 Sport Spider
- 1966–1973 Fiat Dino
- 1967–1972 Fiat 125
- 1969–1985 Fiat 128
- 1969–1977 Fiat 130
- 1971–1983 Fiat 127
- 1972–2000 Fiat 126
- 1972–1981 Fiat 132
- 1972–1982 Fiat X1/9
- 1974–1984 Fiat 131
- 1974–1982 Fiat 133
- 1976–1987 Fiat 147
- 1978–1988 Fiat Ritmo/Strada

== 1920–1939 ==
- 1920–1925 Fiat 510
- 1921–1923 Fiat 520 "Superfiat"
- 1923–1926 Fiat 502
- 1922–1927 Fiat 519
- 1925–1929 Fiat 509
- 1926–1927 Fiat 503
- 1926–1927 Fiat 507
- 1926–1928 Fiat 512
- 1927–1930 Fiat 520
- 1928–1931 Fiat 521
- 1928–1931 Fiat 525
- 1929–1932 Fiat 514
- 1931–1935 Fiat 515
- 1931–1933 Fiat 522
- 1931–1934 Fiat 524
- 1932–1937 Fiat 508 Balilla
- 1933–1938 Fiat 518 Ardita
- 1934–1936 Fiat 527
- 1935–1950 Fiat 1500
- 1936–1955 Fiat 500 "Topolino"
- 1937–1939 Fiat 508 C
- 1938–1944 Fiat 2800
- 1939–1953 Fiat 1100

== 1899–1919 ==
- 1899–1900 Fiat 4 HP
- 1900–1901 Fiat 6 HP
- 1901 Fiat 8 HP
- 1901 Fiat 10 HP
- 1901–1902 Fiat 12 HP
- 1903–1906 Fiat 16-20 HP
- 1901–1905 Fiat 24-32 HP
- 1904–1906 Fiat 60 HP
- 1905–1908 Fiat Brevetti
- 1908–1910 Fiat 1
- 1912–1915 Fiat Zero
- 1912–1920 Fiat 2B
- 1915–1920 Fiat 70
- 1919–1926 Fiat 501
- 1919–1925 Fiat 505

== Light commercial vehicles ==
- 1957–1971 Fiat 1100 T
- 1965–1983 Fiat 238
- 1965–1974 Fiat 241
- 1974–1987 Fiat 242
- 1976–1985 Fiat 900T
- 1978–1983 Fiat Daily
- 1977–2007 Fiat Fiorino
- 1979–2001 Fiat Marengo
- 1985–2000 Fiat Penny

== Fiat (PRODUCT)RED Models ==
Fiat has partnered up with (PRODUCT)^{RED} to produce the (500)RED. It is based on the Fiat 500e.
