= Carrozzeria Garavini =

Italian car design firm and coachbuilder

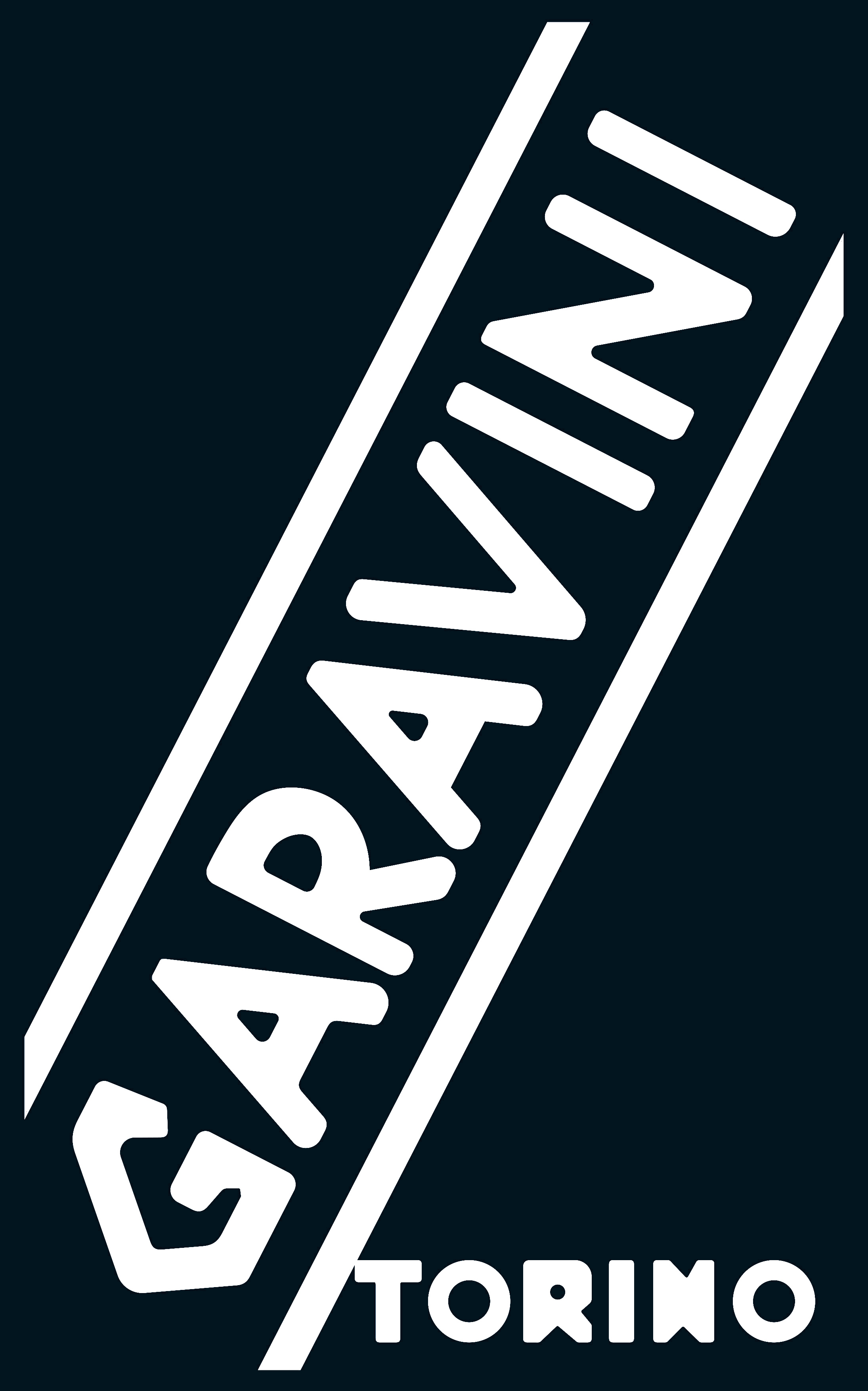
- Type: SA
- Industry: Automotive
- Founded: Turin, Italy (1908)
- Founder: Eusebio Garavini
- Key people: Eusebio Garavini (Founder)
- Services: custom-built vehicles
- Website: https://www.garavinitorino.it/en

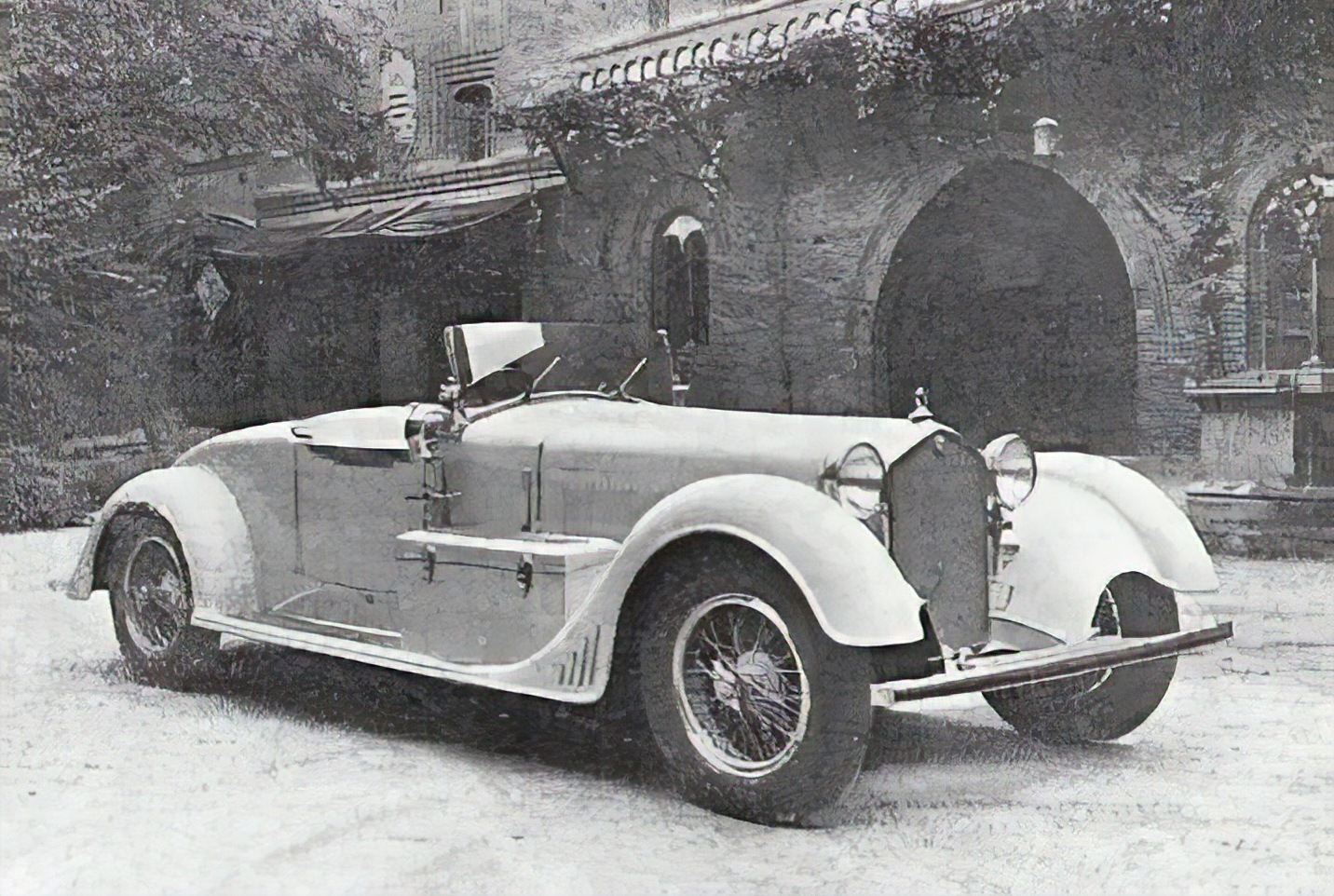
Alfa Romeo 6C 1750 Garavani

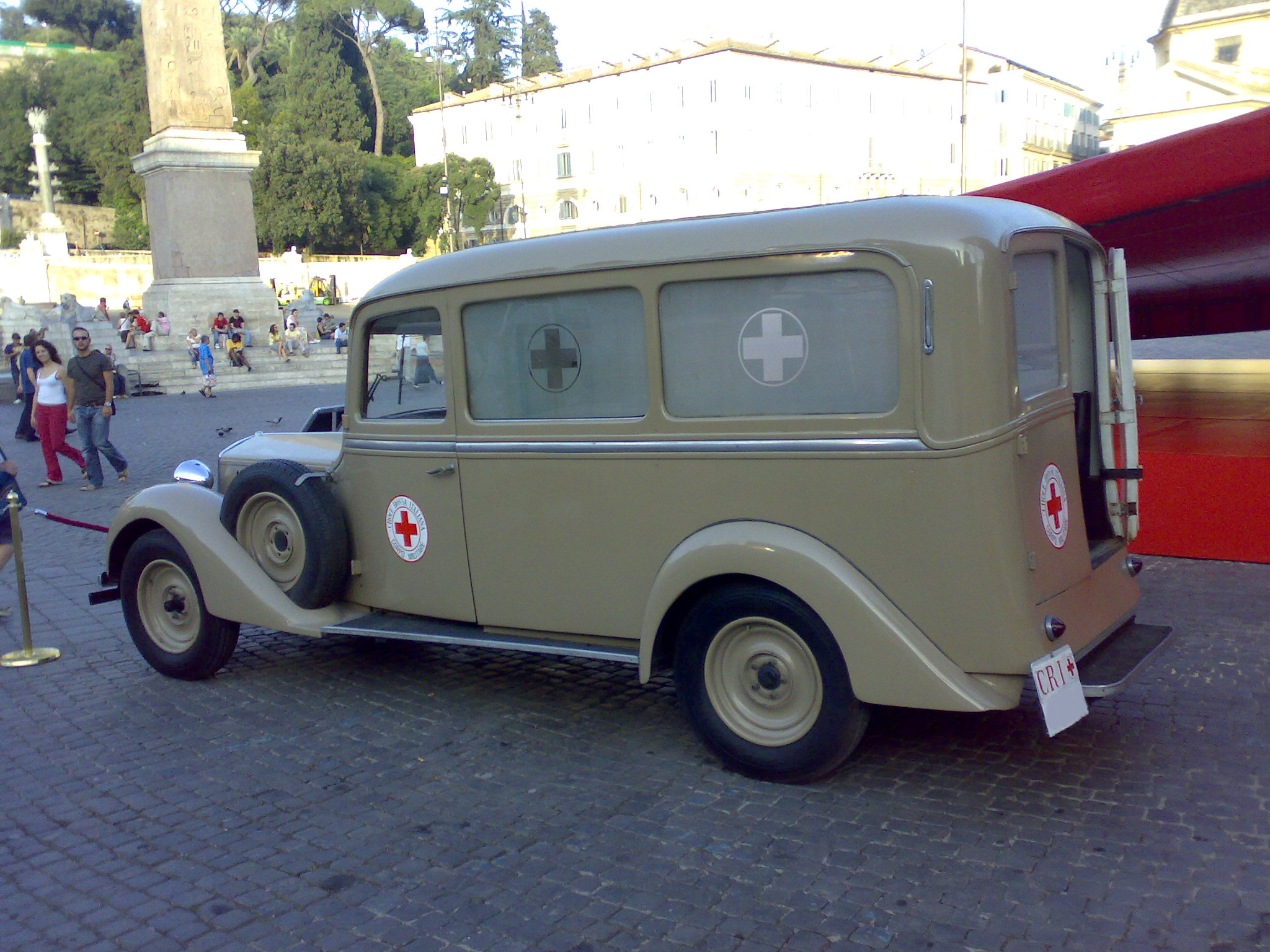
Bianchi S9 ambulance by Garavani

Carrozzeria Garavini was an Italian coachbuilding company based in Turin, Italy.

== History ==
The Carrozzeria Garavini was founded in Turin in 1908 by Eusebio Garavini under the name "Carrozzeria Piemonte".

Eusebio Garavini was born in 1881. In 1899 he was working for Diatto company. In 1908 he managed to tie a co-work agreement with Diatto. In the first years of activity he set up exclusively the frames produced by Diatto and soon the two companies merged into "Diatto and Garavini". In 1914 the "Garavini SA" was born, followed by the "Garavini Carrozzeria Stabilimenti" in 1933.

The company suffered massive damage during the First World War, but managed to build some luxury cars for Itala, Isotta Fraschini, Alfa Romeo, Fiat, OM and Bugatti, as well as numerous ambulances and buses.

In 1927, Garavini patented the "Pluemelastica" and "Plumacciaio" systems, an alternative to the famous patent "Weyman elastic body", to solve the problem of the poor rigidity of the frames and because of the bad roads, stressed the bodywork to the point of damage. It was therefore necessary to anchor the body in a more elastic way, which also reducing the noise level.

In 1947 Aldo Garavini took over the company after his father's death. Concentrating on buses and despite recognition, orders and awards the Viberti and Garavani stopped its work in 1958.

== Main car models by Garavini ==
- Alfa Romeo 6C 1750
- Alfa Romeo 6C 1750 Saloon
- Alfa Romeo 6C 1750 Spider Albatros
- Alfa Romeo 6C 1750 Sport Bateau
- Alfa Romeo 6C 2500
- Alfa Romeo 8C 2300
- Diatto Tipo 30
- Fiat 500
- Fiat 508
- Fiat 508 Balilla
- Fiat 510
- Fiat 514 Victoria
- Fiat 521
- Fiat 525
- Isotta Fraschini Tipo 8
- Itala Tipo 50
- Itala Model 61
- Lancia Appia
- Lancia Artena
- Lancia Astura
- Lancia Augusta
- Rolls-Royce New Phantom
- Rapid Coupé
