= List of Stellantis vehicles =

Stellantis and its predecessors have created numerous vehicles under different brand identities.

- List of Alfa Romeo concept cars
- List of Chrysler vehicles
- List of Citroën vehicles
- List of Dodge vehicles
- List of Dodge concept vehicles
- List of Fiat passenger cars
- List of Jeep vehicles
- List of Lancia concept cars
- List of Maserati vehicles
- List of Opel vehicles
- List of Peugeot vehicles
- List of Vauxhall vehicles
