= Ansaldi =

Ansaldi was an Italian automobile manufacturer founded in Turin in 1904 by Michele Ansaldi an engineer, designer, and industrialist. The only car they produced was sold as the F.I.A.T. Brevetti after the company was taken over in 1905.

In 1904 the Ansaldi automobile company in Turin manufactured a small car with a Fiat 10/12 HP engine. It featured the world's first 'pre-formed' chassis, plus a drive shaft and differential unit with bevelled gears and universal joints.

In 1905 Fiat bought Ansaldi and launched the car as the Fiat-Ansaldi 10-12 HP. In 1906 it was renamed the Fiat Societa-Brevetti, and 1,600 were produced by 1912 with the Fiat Brevetti 2.

== See also ==
- Ceirano GB & C
- Itala, car manufacturer based in Turin from 1904–1934, started in 1903 by Matteo Ceirano and five partners.
