= Fiat 60 HP =

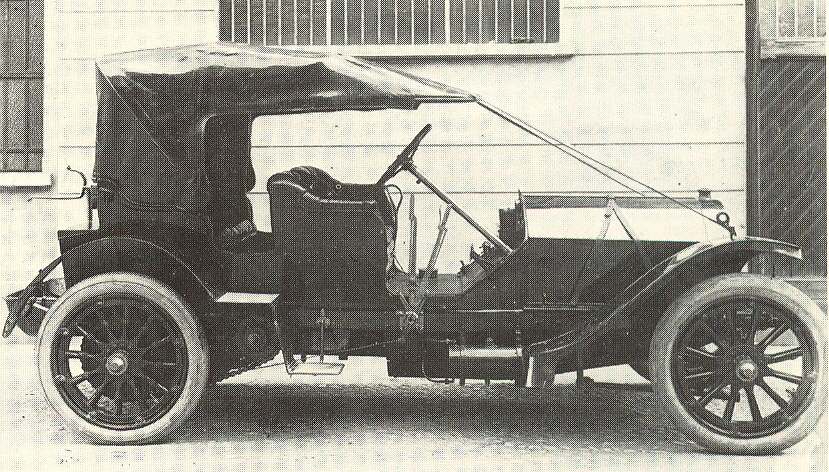

Overview
- Manufacturer: Fiat
- Production: 1904–1906; 86 produced

Body and chassis
- Class: Luxury car
- Layout: FR layout

Powertrain
- Engine: 10,563 cc I4; 11,040 cc I6
- Transmission: 4-speed manual

Dimensions
- Length: 4,750 mm (187 in)
- Width: 1,550 mm (61 in)
- Height: 2,550 mm (100 in)
- Curb weight: 1,750 kg (3,858 lb)

Chronology
- Predecessor: Fiat 24-32 HP
- Successor: Fiat 16-20 HP

The Fiat 60 HP is an automobile produced by Italian manufacturer Fiat from 1904 to 1906. It competed in races such as the Paris–Madrid race of 1903, (driven by Vincenzo Lancia and Luigi Storero) and the Circuit des Ardennes, along with other races and hill climbs.

The 60 HP was the first car to feature Fiat's all new pressed steel chassis. At the top of the range was Turin’s answer to the Mercedes Sixty, a 10.6 litre four cylinder monster - Motoring historian Michael Sedgwick referring to the Fiat 60 HP in his book FIAT.

Many of these cars went off to rich export markets, including the USA. They were popular among wealthy socialites of the time. Featuring a honeycomb radiator (under licence by Mercedes) these cars were at the forefront of technology – many period articles praised its advanced oiling system.

Designed to a high standard in every detail, it was welcomed by American coachbuilders such as Quimby and Demarest. To facilitate their work, this car was offered with 2 different wheelbases, normal and long. It was originally equipped with a 4-cylinder engine block 60 h.p which was later replaced with a bi-tri-6-cylinder engine block 50/60 h.p and was manufactured at the plant in Corso Dante.
