= Fiat 24-32 HP =

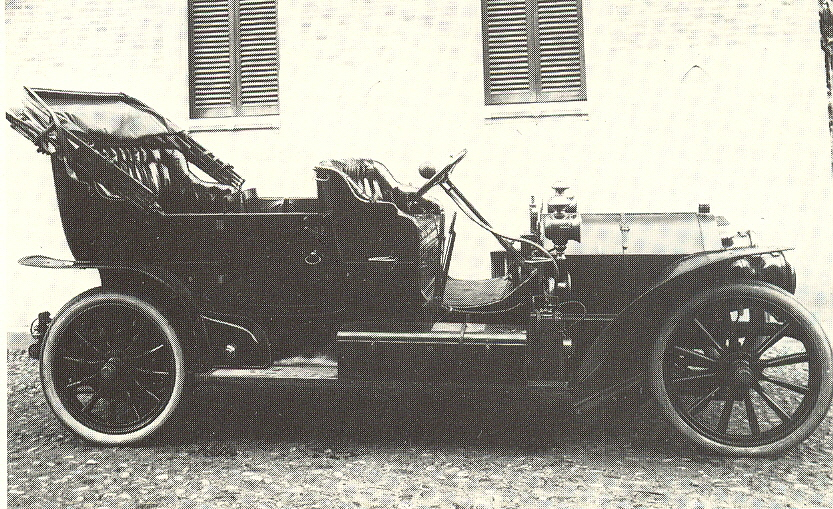

Overview
- Manufacturer: Fiat
- Production: 1901–1905 around 400 produced
- Assembly: Corso Dante plant, Turin, Italy

Body and chassis
- Class: Luxury car
- Layout: FR layout

Powertrain
- Engine: 6371 cc straight-4 6902 cc straight-4 7363 cc straight-4
- Transmission: 4-speed manual

Dimensions
- Length: 4,000 mm (157 in)-4,380 mm (172 in)
- Width: 1,430 mm (56 in)
- Height: 2,350 mm (93 in)
- Curb weight: 1,700 kg (3,748 lb)

Chronology
- Predecessor: Fiat 12 HP
- Successor: Fiat 16-20 HP

The Fiat 24-32 HP was introduced by the Italian automobile manufacturer Fiat in 1901. The car was designed to allow coachbuilders to make various bodies to fit. It was offered with three different wheelbases, short, medium and long.

It was equipped with a 4-cylinder engine:

- 1st series with a 6371 cc engine - 32 hp
- 2nd series in 1904 with a 6902 cc engine - 32 hp
- 3rd series in 1905 with a 7363 cc engine - 32 hp

More than 400 were made in the Corso Dante plant in Turin.

The Fiat 24-32 HP featured some important technological innovations: it was the first sedan car to use a "Landaulet" body type and was the first car to have an accelerator pedal and a gearbox with four forward gears. The road model could achieve a top speed of 75 kilometres per hour (47 mph).

In 1902, Fiat introduced a racing version of the 24 HP, The 24 HP Corsa. This was the first car ever to be specially designed for racing rather than derived from a series production automobile. The Corsa had a full steel chassis rather than the wood chassis that dominated at the time, and a twin-engine block 7238 cc developing 40 hp. Weighing in at just 450 kilograms (992 lb), it ran at speeds in excess of 100 kilometres per hour (62 mph), a very high speed in those days. This car dominated its competitors from its first release into competition. The car won the Côte-Superga Sassi race, near Turin, on June 29 and July 27, 1902, with Vincenzo Lancia driving, and the Susa - Col du Mont-Cenis race at an average speed of 44.16 kilometres per hour (27.44 mph).
