= Fiat 6 HP =

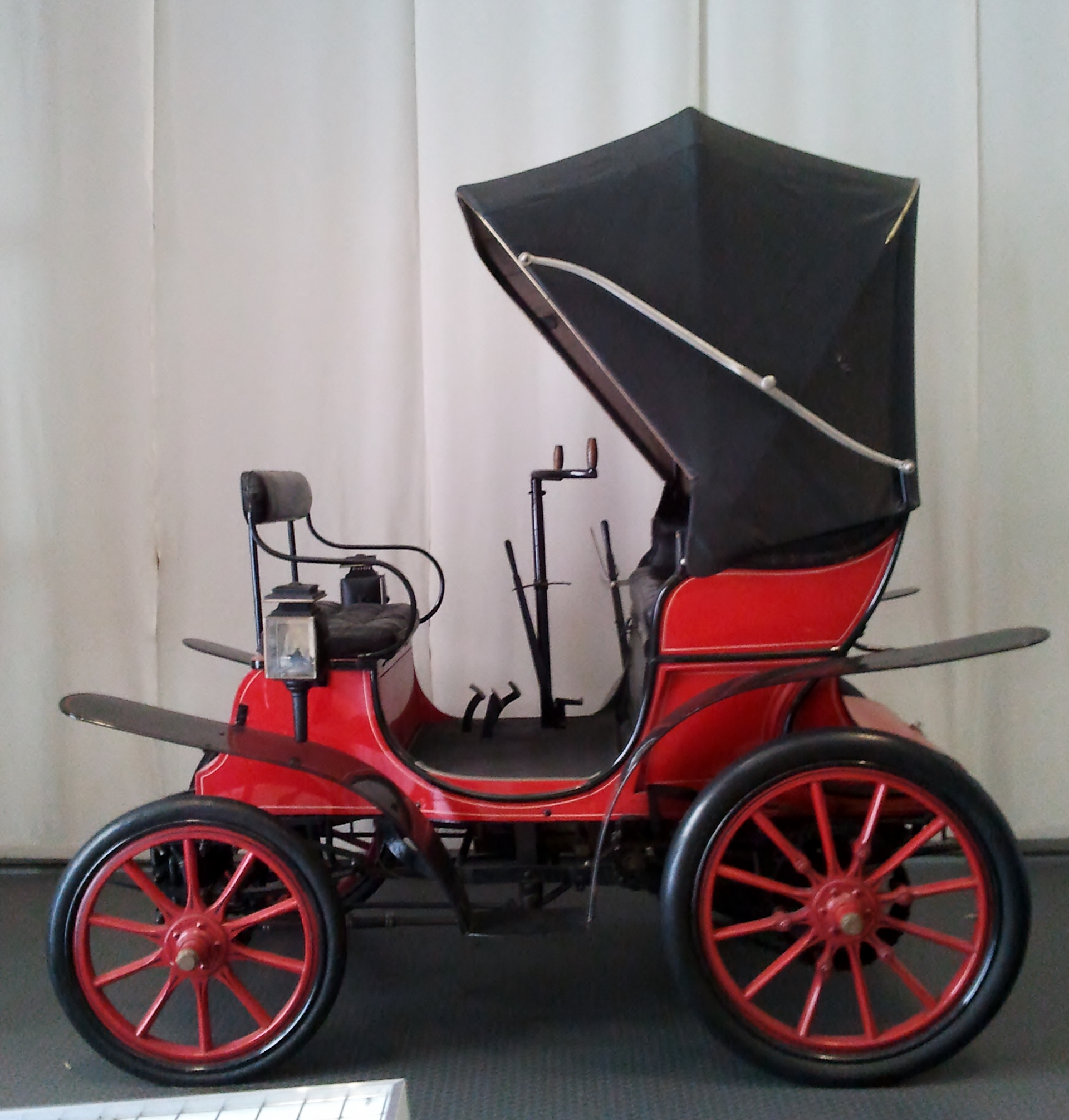

Overview
- Manufacturer: Fiat
- Production: 1900–1901; 20 produced
- Designer: Aristide Faccioli

Body and chassis
- Body style: Phaeton
- Layout: RWD

Powertrain
- Engine: straight-2 1082 cc
- Transmission: 3-speed manual

Dimensions
- Wheelbase: 1,750 mm (69 in)
- Length: 2,810 mm (111 in)
- Width: 1,450 mm (57 in)
- Height: 1,620 mm (64 in)
- Curb weight: 1,000 kg (2,205 lb)

Chronology
- Predecessor: Fiat 3½ HP
- Successor: Fiat 8 HP

The Fiat 6 HP is a car produced by the Italian manufacturer Fiat from 1900 to 1901. The 6 HP was introduced after Fiat's original Fiat 4 HP, and, alongside the increased horsepower, the vehicle was changed from the original with its reverse gear and uses rear-wheel drive. Fiat also produced a special racing model, the 6 HP Corsa. The Corsa was driven in competition by noted drivers, including Vincenzo Lancia and Felice Nazzaro. This version was the first racing car produced by Fiat.
