= Samochód pancerny wz. 29 =

Polish armored car

Samochód Pancerny wzór 29
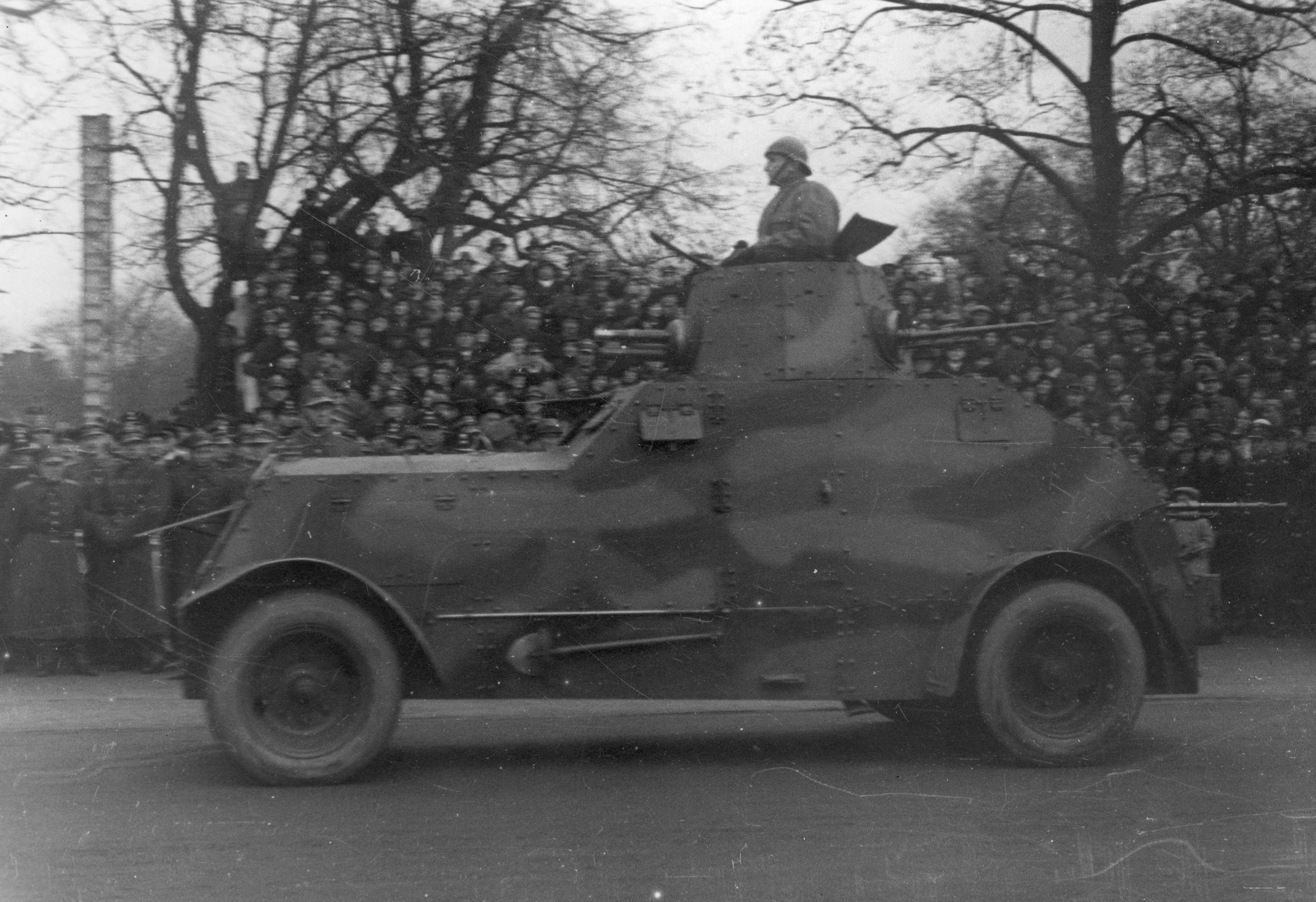
- Type: Armored car
- Place of origin: Poland

Production history
- Designer: Rudolf Gundlach
- Designed: 1929
- No. built: 10 to 13

Specifications
- Mass: 4.8 t
- Length: with MG: 5.49 without MG: 5.15 m
- Width: 1.85 m
- Height: 2.48 m
- Crew: 4 (driver, backward driver, commander/gunner, rear gunner)
- Armor: 4–10 mm
- Main armament: 37 mm SA-18 Puteaux L/21 gun
- Secondary armament: 2 x 7.92 mm wz. 25 Hotchkiss machine guns
- Engine: Ursus-2A 4-cylinder gasoline 35 hp (26 kW)
- Power/weight: 7.3 hp/tonne
- Suspension: wheels, 4 x 2
- Operational range: 380 km
- Maximum speed: 35 km/h

Samochód Pancerny wzór 29 ("armoured car year 1929 model"), commonly known as Ursus or CWS, was a Polish interwar heavy armored car. A handful of these vehicles saw combat during the Polish-German War of 1939.

== History and description ==
The car was designed in 1929 by Rudolf Gundlach. The vehicle was based on the chassis of the Ursus A truck (Italian S.P.A. 25C modified by Ursus Mechanical Works in Warsaw), the armored body was built by CWS, Warsaw. The initial armament consisted of the French 37 mm low-velocity gun in the turret front, 7.92 mm machine guns in the turret left-rear and right-rear at 120 degrees to the gun (all operated by the commander), and another 7.92 mm MG in the hull rear (operated by the rear gunner). Although this arrangement helped to achieve good balance of the turret, it was awkward to use. In the mid-1930s the right turret machine gun was removed. The car carried 96 rounds for the main gun and 4,032 MG rounds in 16 252-round belts.The vehicle was sufficiently armed and armored for the late 1920s, but was underpowered, lacked all-wheel drive (which led to poor off-road mobility) and had high silhouette. Because of these shortcomings, only between 10 and 13 cars were built.

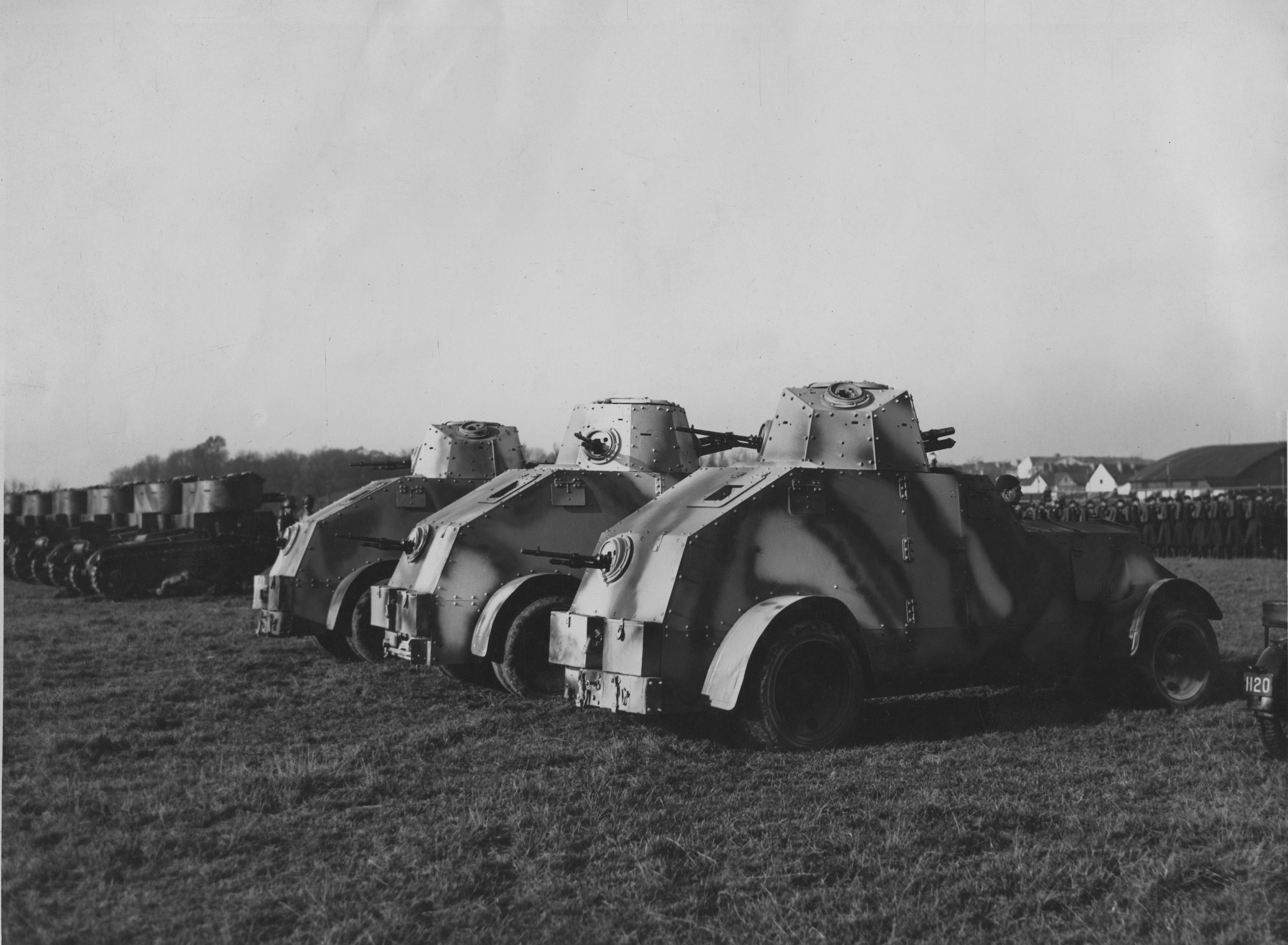
Armoured cars wz. 29

== Combat history ==
Although obsolete by 1939, the car was still in service at the outbreak of the Second World War. 8 vehicles were assigned to the 11th armoured battalion of the Mazowiecka Cavalry Brigade, Army Modlin, as a reconnaissance unit. The vehicles were used in several skirmishes with German forces, including the Battle of Seroczyn. The remaining armored cars were incorporated into the Lublin Army. These were destroyed by Polish forces on 16 September 1939 due to their inability to move through the rough terrain southeast of Lublin and the need to conserve fuel for other vehicles.
