= Fiat 507 =

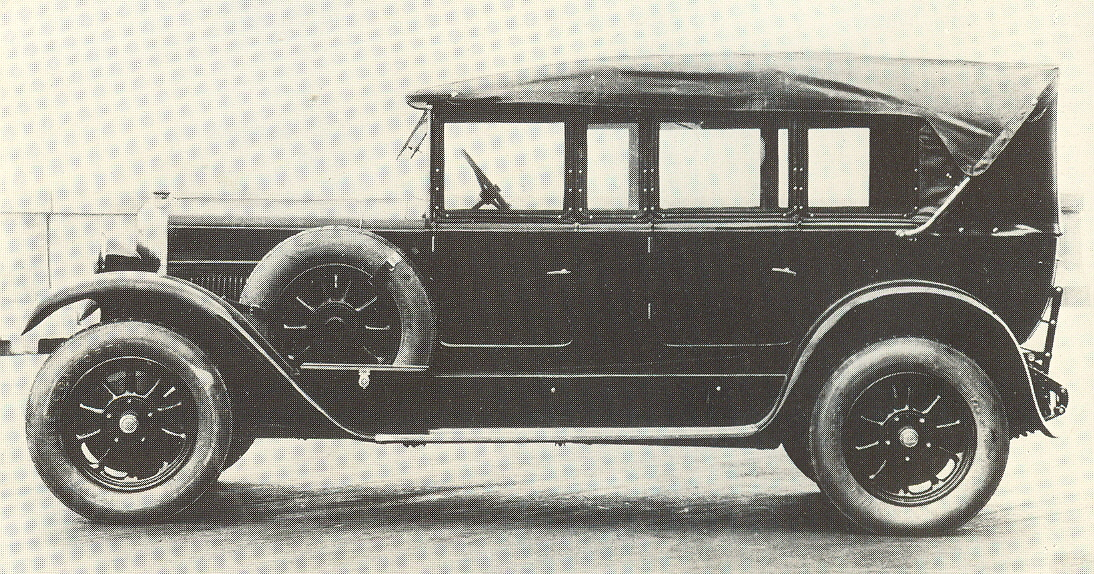

Overview
- Manufacturer: Fiat
- Production: 1926–1927

Body and chassis
- Body style: 4-door sedan 4-door cabriolet
- Layout: FR layout

Powertrain
- Engine: straight-4 2296 cc 35 hp
- Transmission: 4-speed manual

Dimensions
- Wheelbase: 305 cm (120.1 in)
- Curb weight: 1,450 kg (3,200 lb)

Chronology
- Predecessor: Fiat 505
- Successor: Fiat 520

The Fiat 507 is a passenger car produced by Italian automobile manufacturer Fiat between 1926 and 1927. The car was developed from the 505 model, with a modified suspension and brakes.

Fiat produced 3,700 507s during its production run.
