= Fiat 505 =

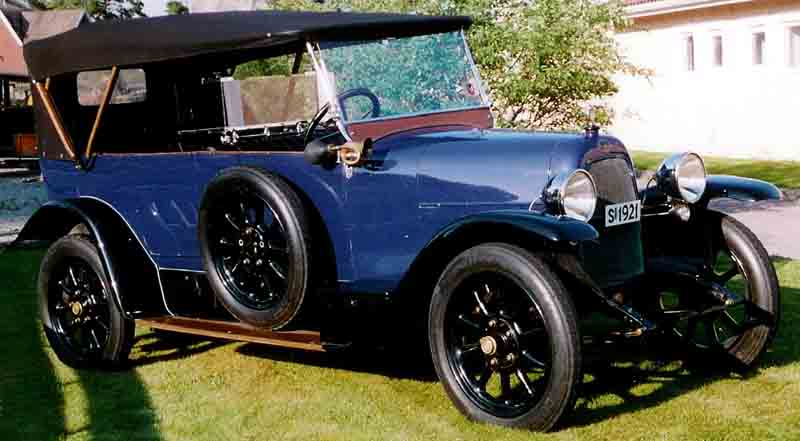
- Fiat 505 Torpedo 1921

Overview
- Manufacturer: Fiat
- Production: 1919–1925

Body and chassis
- Body style: 4-door sedan, 4-door Torpedo; 4-door cabriolet truck
- Layout: FR layout

Powertrain
- Engine: straight-4 2296 cc 30 hp
- Transmission: 4-speed manual

Dimensions
- Wheelbase: 305 cm (120.1 in)
- Curb weight: 1,550 kg (3,417 lb)

Chronology
- Predecessor: Fiat 2B
- Successor: Fiat 507

The Fiat 505 is a passenger car produced by Fiat between 1919 and 1925. The 505 was based on the same basic design as the four-cylinder Fiat 501, but with a larger engine and bigger exterior dimensions. With a 2296 cc (30 hp) engine, the car could reach a top speed of 80 kilometres per hour (50 mph).

30,000 examples of the Fiat 505 were produced.
