= Fiat 12 HP =

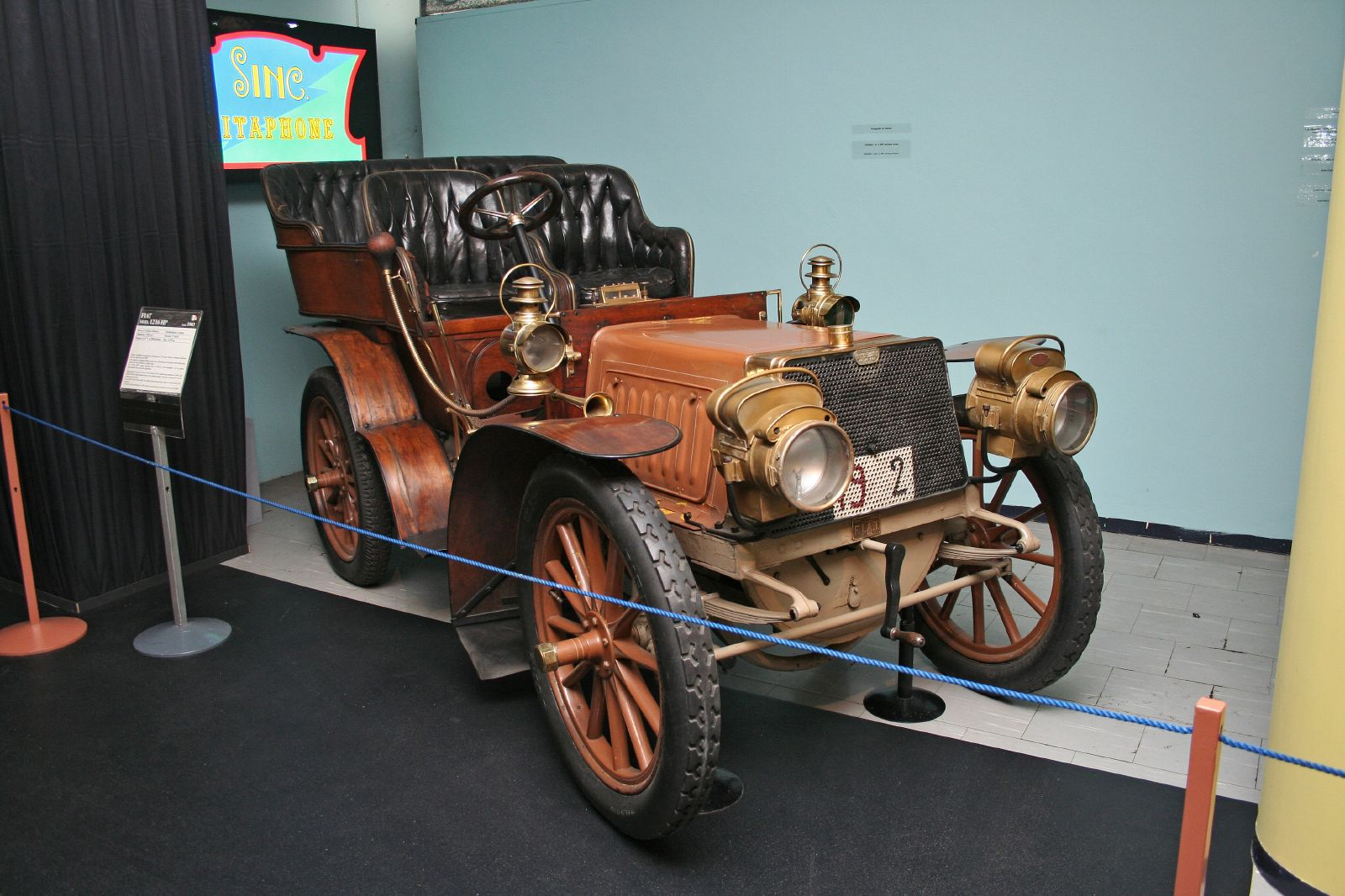

Overview
- Manufacturer: Fiat
- Production: 1901–1902; 106 produced
- Assembly: Corso Dante plant, Turin, Italy
- Designer: Giovanni Enrico

Body and chassis
- Layout: FR layout

Powertrain
- Engine: 3770 cc I4
- Transmission: 3-speed manual

Dimensions
- Wheelbase: 2,140 mm (84 in)
- Length: 3,270 mm (129 in)
- Width: 1,630 mm (64 in)
- Height: 1,650 mm (65 in)
- Curb weight: 1,220 kg (2,690 lb)

Chronology
- Predecessor: Fiat 10 HP
- Successor: Fiat 16-20 HP

The Fiat 12 HP is a car produced by the Italian manufacturer Fiat in 1901 and 1902. The car was designed by the engineer Giovanni Enrico, successor to the Faccioli who had engineered the first three Fiat models, it was the first Fiat and one of the first cars of this era equipped with a two-block four-cylinder engines. It was manufactured in 106 copies in the plant Corso Dante. A racing version was also made the 12 HP 1901 Corsa which incorporated the same engine. The maximum speed was 78 kilometres per hour (48 mph). This car put an end to the domination of Panhard on European courses.

At the end of 1901, a version equipped with a new engine is also proposed. This received a four-cylinder 7475 cc engine with a bore and stroke of 115 mm × 180 mm (4.53 in × 7.09 in), producing 28 PS (21 kW) at 750 rpm and allowing it to reach a top speed of 90 kilometres per hour (56 mph).

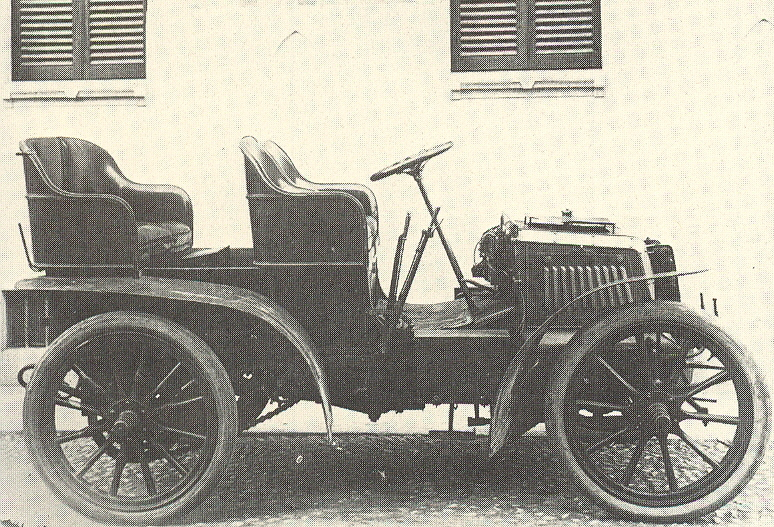
Fiat 12 HP double Phaeton

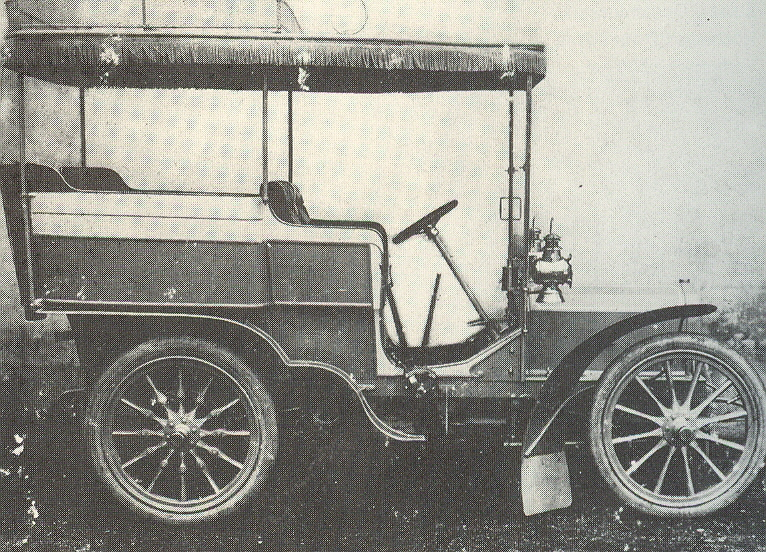
Fiat 12 HP 1901
