= Fiat 2B =

Car produced by Fiat from 1912 to 1920

Fiat Tipo 2B
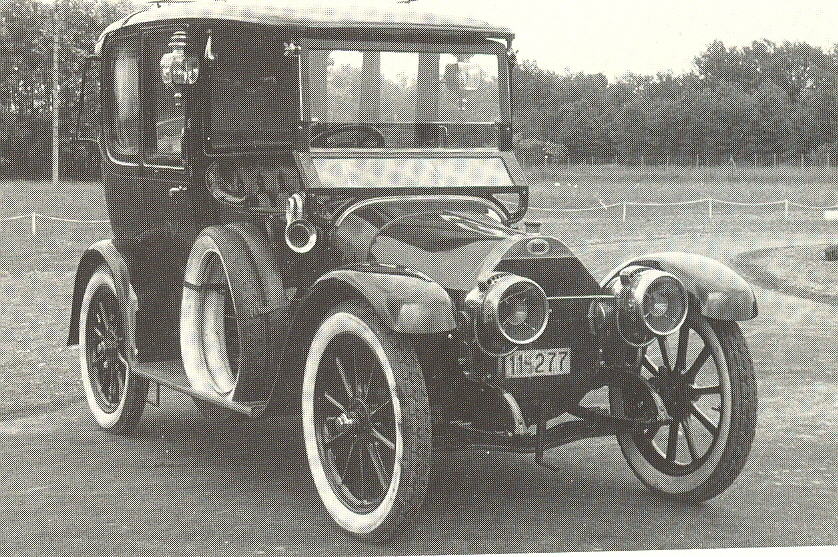

Overview
- Manufacturer: Fiat
- Production: 1912–1920; 22 518 produced

Body and chassis
- Layout: FR layout

Powertrain
- Engine: straight-4 2815 cc

Chronology
- Predecessor: Fiat Brevetti
- Successor: Fiat 505

The Fiat Tipo 2B is a car produced by the Italian manufacturer Fiat between 1912 and 1920.

The Tipo 2B has a 2815 cc four-cylinder side-valve monoblock engine with 80 mm bore, a 140 mm stroke, and a compression ratio of 4.2:1, producing 28 hp at 1800 rpm. The standard tire on this model is an 815X105. The Tipo 2B has a 4-speed gearbox and a factory top speed of 70 km/h (43 mph)/75 km/h (47 mph).

Early Tipo 2B cars had an angular radiator shell, with later production models having a taller pear-shaped radiator shell.

The Tipo 2B from-the-factory chassis, ready for installation of various body styles, weighed 760 kilograms (1,680 lb).

2,332 were produced between 1912 and 1914.

They are also known as the "52B," from the Fiat model number for the engine installed in the Tipo 2B.

The Tipo 2B was a scaled-up version of the Fiat model Zero.
