= Fiat Brevetti =

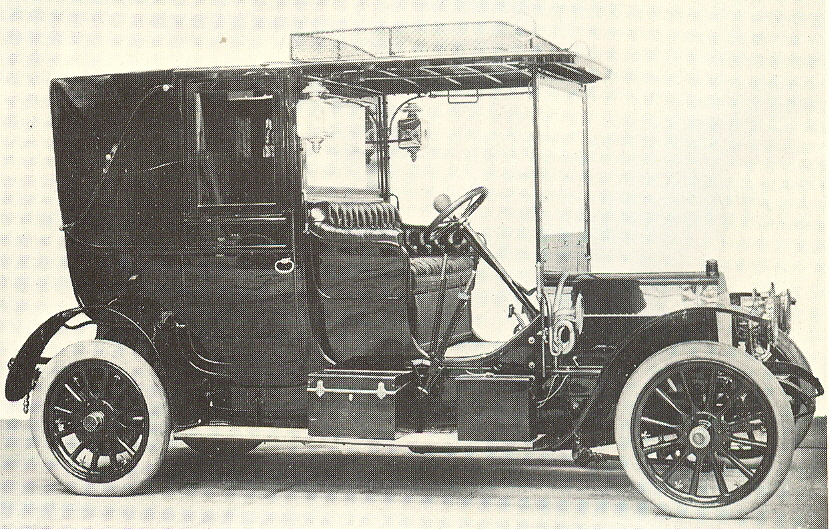
- Fiat Brevetti Cabriolet-Royal 1906

Overview
- Manufacturer: Fiat
- Production: 1905–1908
- Assembly: Corso Dante, Turin, Italy

Body and chassis
- Body style: Torpedo
- Layout: FR layout

Powertrain
- Engine: 3052 cc I4
- Transmission: 4-speed manual gearbox

Dimensions
- Length: 4,215 mm (165.9 in)
- Width: 1,650 mm (65.0 in)
- Height: 2,350 mm (92.5 in)
- Curb weight: 1,200 kg (2,646 lb)

Chronology
- Predecessor: Fiat 16-20 HP
- Successor: Fiat Brevetti 2 (15-25 HP)

The Brevetti is an automobile presented by Fiat in 1905 as a result of the acquisition of the Ansaldi company. From the Ansaldi, Fiat prepared the 10–12 HP, renamed “Brevetti” in 1906. A second series, the “Brevetti 2” was built from 1909.

The Brevetti was equipped with a 3052 cc engine producing 20 hp (15 kW). The “Brevetti 2”, originally named the 15-25 HP, was based on the same mechanics but the engine was upgraded to 25 PS (18 kW). Both versions were assembled in the plant of Corso Dante in Turin.
