= Fiat 525 =

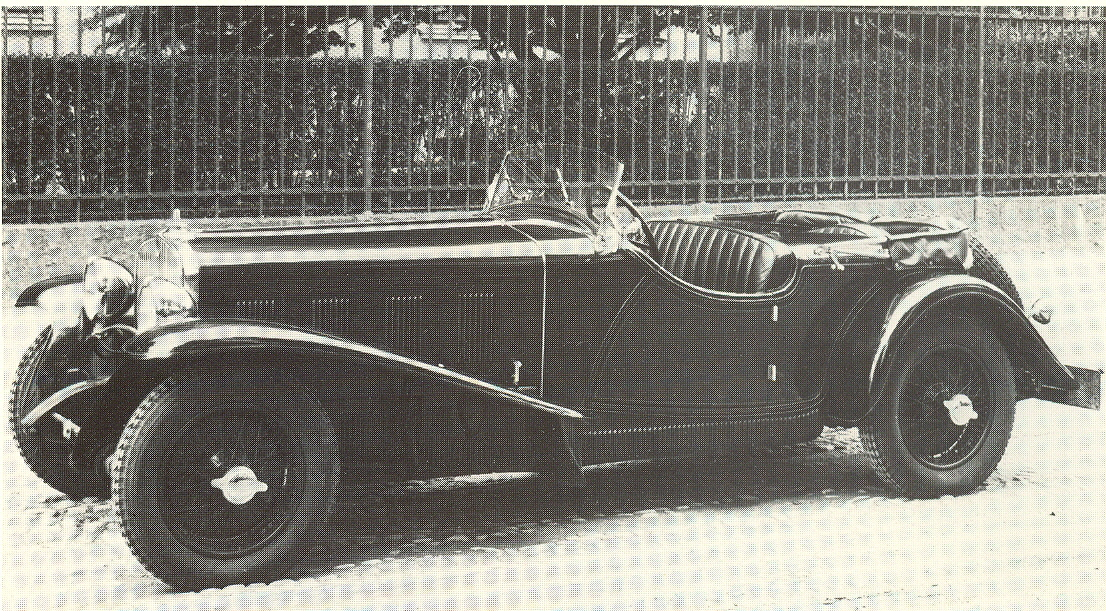
- Fiat 525 SS 1928

Overview
- Manufacturer: Fiat
- Production: 1928–1931

Body and chassis
- Class: Luxury car
- Body style: 4-door sedan 2/4-door cabriolet 2-door spider
- Layout: FR layout

Powertrain
- Engine: 3739 cc straight-6
- Transmission: 4-speed manual

Dimensions
- Wheelbase: 300 cm (118.1 in) (525 SS); 326 cm (128.3 in) (525 N); 340 cm (133.9 in) (525)
- Curb weight: 1,450 kg (3,200 lb)-1,900 kg (4,200 lb)

Chronology
- Predecessor: Fiat 512; Fiat 519
- Successor: Fiat 524

The Fiat 525 is a passenger car produced by Italian automobile manufacturer Fiat between 1928 and 1931. The 525 was a larger successor to the Fiat 512. The 525 was modified a year after it began production and renamed the 525N. A sport variant, the 525SS, had a more powerful engine and a shorter chassis.

Fiat produced 4,400 525's.

== Engines ==
Model	Years	Engine	Displacement	Power	Fuel system
525	1928–1929	straight-6 sidevalve	3739 cc	69 hp (51 kW)	single carburetor
525 SS	1928–1931	straight-6 sidevalve	3739 cc	89 hp (66 kW)	single carburetor

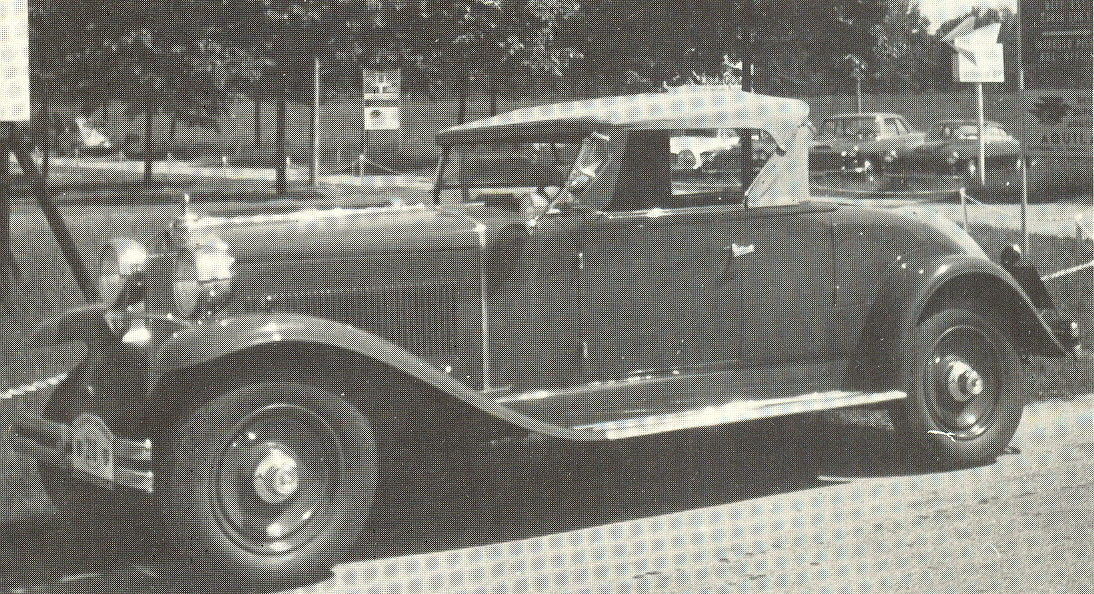
Fiat 525 N Spider 1929

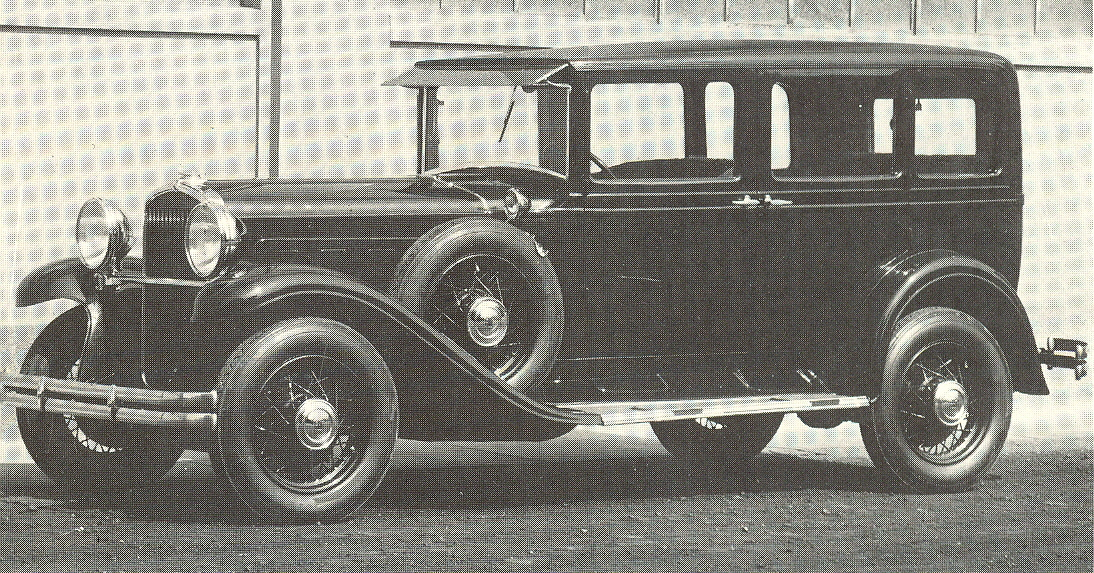
Fiat 525 S Sedan 1929

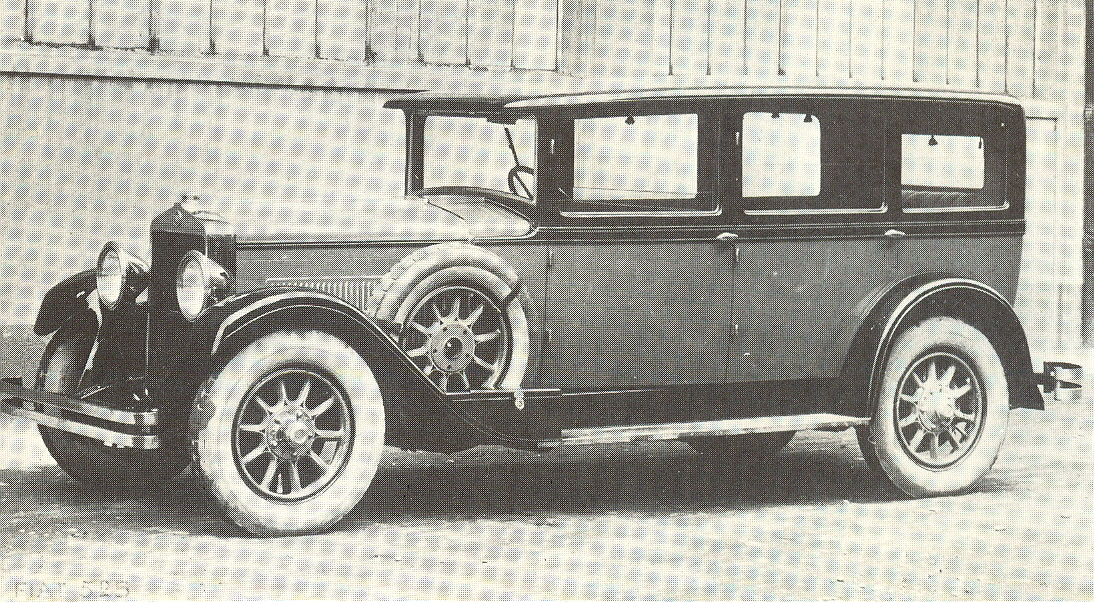
Fiat 525 Sedan 1928
