= Fiat 520 =

The Fiat 520 is the name of two different Fiat models produced during the 1920s.

== 520 "Superfiat" (1921–1923) ==
Fiat 520
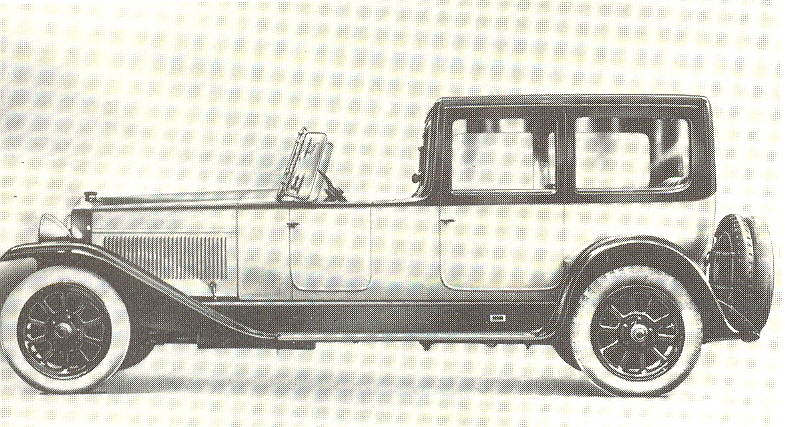
- Fiat 520 Superfiat Dorsay-Torpedo 1921

Overview
- Manufacturer: Fiat
- Production: 1921–1922

Body and chassis
- Class: Luxury car
- Body style: 4-door cabriolet 4-door Sedanca de Ville
- Layout: FR layout

Powertrain
- Engine: 6.8 L V12; 6805 cc
- Transmission: 3-speed manual

Dimensions
- Wheelbase: 386 cm (152.0 in)
- Curb weight: 1,850 kg (4,080 lb)

Chronology
- Successor: Fiat 519

Fiat's first entrant in the luxury car market, the 520 "Superfiat" was equipped with a V12 engine of 6,805 cc that produced an estimated 90 bhp. For several years in the early 1920s, the Superfiat was the only car in the world offered with a V12 engine.

== 520 (1927–1930) ==
Fiat 520
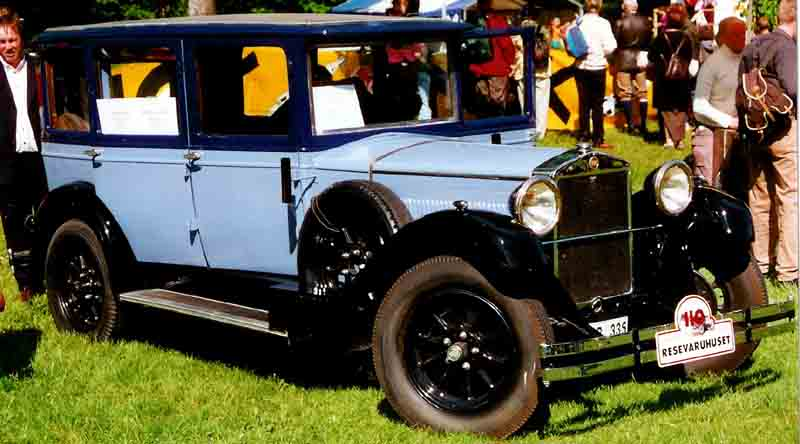

Overview
- Manufacturer: Fiat
- Production: 1927–1930

Body and chassis
- Body style: 4-door sedan 4-door landaulette 4-door cabriolet
- Layout: FR layout

Powertrain
- Engine: 2,244 cc straight-6
- Transmission: 4-speed manual

Dimensions
- Wheelbase: 2,900 mm (114.2 in)
- Length: 4,150 mm (163.4 in)
- Width: 1,660 mm (65.4 in)
- Curb weight: 1,250 kg (2,760 lb)

Chronology
- Predecessor: Fiat 507
- Successor: Fiat 521

Fiat's "upper middle-class" model in the later 1920s was also designated the 520, but was smaller and more modestly powered than its earlier namesake.

During the early decades of the 20th century, European automakers, once steering wheels had replaced centrally positioned steering tillers, tended to place the driver and his steering wheel on the right side of the car regardless of local regulations or conventions concerning which side of the road cars should be driven. By the 1920s, as the number of motorized vehicles on the roads increased, clearer consensus had become necessary in the more populous parts of Italy about the need for everyone to drive along the right side of the road. The 1927 Fiat 520 was one of the first cars, presumably in recognition of this trend, to place the steering wheel on the left side of the car.

The 520 was replaced by the Fiat 521 in 1928, although the 520 appears to have continued in production until 1929, by when more than 20,000 six-cylinder Fiat 520s had been produced.

=== Engines ===
Model	Years	Engine	Displacement	Power	Fuel system
520	1927–29	straight-6 sidevalve	2244 cc	46 hp (34 kW)	single carburetor
520 T	1928–30	straight-6 sidevalve	1866 cc	35 hp (26 kW)	single carburetor
