= Fiat 1 =

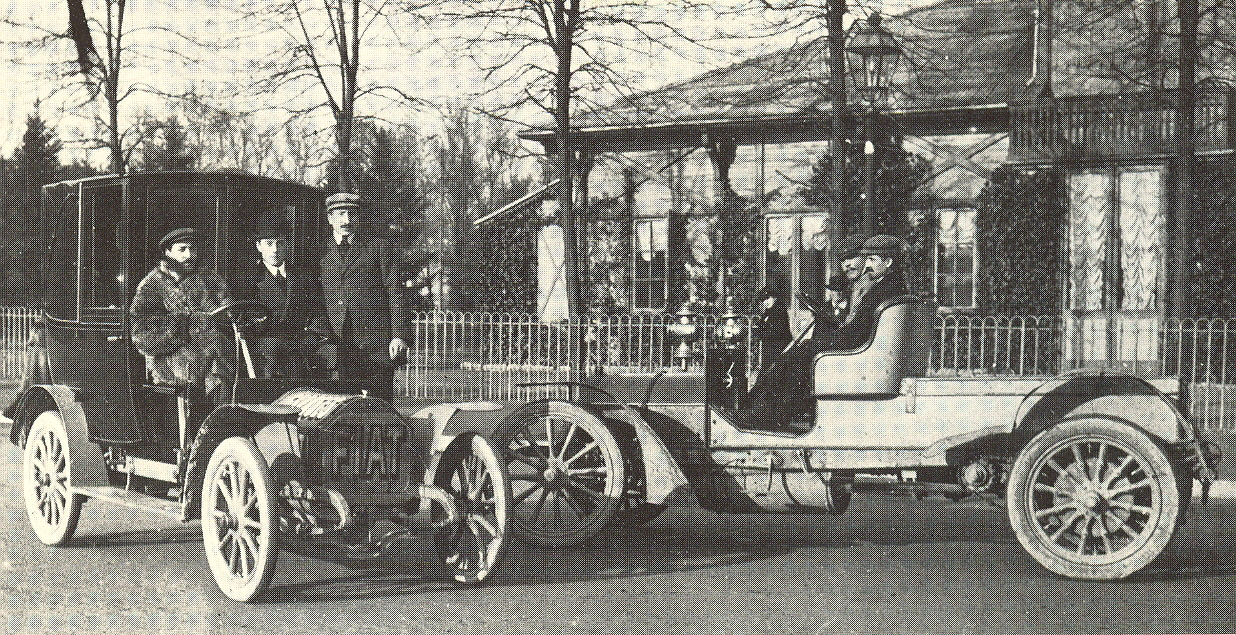

Overview
- Manufacturer: Fiat
- Production: 1908–1910

Body and chassis
- Body style: Berlina
- Layout: FR layout

Powertrain
- Engine: straight-4 2200 cc
- Transmission: 4-speed manual

Chronology
- Successor: Fiat Zero

The Fiat 1 or Fiat 1 Fiacre was produced by Fiat from 1908 to 1910. It had an engine capacity of 2,200 cc (2.2 L; 130 cu in), which produced 16 PS (11.8 kW). The car had a top speed of 70 km/h (43 mph).

The four cylinders were for the first time in a single block, taking a cue from the Italian car manufacturer Aquila.

Around 1600 copies of the Fiacre were produced, intended for use as taxis. The model was sold in Italy and abroad. It was used in New York City, London, Paris and other cities.

In 1908 the Fiat Automobile Co was founded in the United States.
