= Fiat Tris =

Overview
- Manufacturer: Fiat Professional
- Production: 2025–present
- Assembly: Morocco: Kenitra (Fiat Kenitra)

Body and chassis
- Class: Tricycle
- Body style: Flatbed, pickup and chassis cab

Powertrain
- Power output: 12 hp (9 kW)
- Transmission: Propulsion
- Range: 90 km

Dimensions
- Length: 3170 mm
- Curb weight: 485 kg; Payload: 540 kg

The Fiat Tris is a battery electric, three-wheeled utility vehicle, the first vehicle of its kind, designed by the Italian manufacturer Fiat Professional. Was presented on 12 May 2025, it is manufactured in the new Fiat factory in Kenitra, Morocco.

== Overview ==
This micro utility vehicle (3.17 metres long with a turning radius of 3.05 meters) has one wheel at the front and two at the rear. It competes with the Piaggio Ape (now also available in an electric version) family of three-wheeled vehicles that contributed to the success of the scooter brand, which was also once owned by the Agnelli family, the historical owners of the Fiat group.

It is based on the same technical platform as the Topolino, Citroën Ami, and Opel Rocks-e electric microcars (which don't require a driver's license), all produced in the same factory in Morocco. The Tris has significantly more power (12 hp versus 8). It is powered by a 6.9 kWh lithium-ion battery (compared to 5.5 kWh), giving it a range of 90 km (compared to 75 km). Its top speed is limited to 45 km/h. It recharges using a standard 240V household outlet, reaching 80% charge in just 3 hours and 100% in under 5 hours.

The Tris will initially will be marketed in key African and Middle Eastern markets, but it's possible it will also reach European markets. This cargo tricycle could become the smart solution for last-mile deliveries or mail distribution in urban areas, similar to how La Poste (the French postal service ) uses VUF XXL Fit Poly electric cargo bikes in over 60 cities, though these bikes don't offer postal workers protection.

The vehicle features a USB-C port and a 12V socket. It has been homologated according to European regulations and is equipped with three-point seat belts, automatic LED headlights, a reversing alarm, and all required safety features. The cabin can accommodate the driver and one passenger.
