= Michele Ansaldi =

Michele Ansaldi was an Italian industrialist from Turin who manufactured machine tools, later involved also in car industry. He is known as one of the first and leading industrialists in the machine tool sector in Italy. He took an interest in the automotive sector, forming a partnership with FIAT and later with the Ceirano family, pioneers of motor vehicles in Turin. He was in fact the co-founder the S.P.A. (Società Piemontese Automobili) in Turin in 1906 which manufactured cars, commercial vehicles, aero engines and military vehicles.

== The beginning - the Michele Ansaldi Engineering Works ==
He started working in the machine tools factory of the L. Tarizzo & C., in Favria Canavese (Piedmont). In 1880, he became a partner in Tarizzo, transforming the machine tool company into Tarizzo-Ansaldi Company. In 1884, he founded his own company, Michele Ansaldi Engineering Works, and moved to Turin, where, in 1886, he set up a 3,500-square-metre factory at 40 Corso Giulio Cesare in Turin, in the Aurora industrial district. In 1884, he became a partner in Tarizzo, transforming the machine tool company into Tarizzo-Ansaldi. In 1884, he founded his own company and moved to Turin, where, in 1886, he set up a 3,500-square-metre factory at 40 Corso Giulio Cesare in Turin, in the Aurora industrial district. Following great success in his sector, he moved again in 1899 to a much larger site: the large block bounded by Via Cuneo, Corso Vigevano, Corso Vercelli and Via Damiano, covering approximately 25,000 square metres. The factory was situated still in Aurora industrial district, bur further from the city center, next to the customs boundary and was well connected to the Turin–Milan railway line.

== FIAT - Ansaldi ==
In 1904 he founded the Ansaldi automobile company in Milan which manufactured a small car with a Fiat 10/12 HP engine. It featured the world's first 'pre-formed' chassis, plus a drive shaft and differential unit with bevelled gears and universal joints.

In 1905, encouraged in part by the bank Banca Commerciale Italiana (around which the main industrial conglomerates of the Italian steel industry were centred), Michele Ansaldi decided to join forces with FIAT to form the company FIAT-Ansaldi, which was to produce light four-cylinder vehicles, namely cars. The following year, however, Michele Ansaldi was ousted following a dramatic power struggle with the car manufacturer’s management, represented by Vittorio Scarfiotti and Giovanni Agnelli senior. He was therefore forced to leave the company, which changed its name to FIAT Brevetti and took over the site where Michele Ansaldi had been established.

In 1905 the Fiat Ansaldi company launched the car as the Fiat-Ansaldi 10-12 HP. In 1906, when it was renamed Fiat Brevetti, production continued until 1912 with the Fiat Brevetti 2.

== S.P.A. (Società Piemontese Automobili) ==
Michele Ansaldi, having been dismissed from his former company, joined forces Matteo Ceirano (one of the Ceirano brothers, who were very active in the Turin motor industry), and on 12 June 1906 founded the S.P.A. (Società Piemontese Automobili) in Turin. Ansaldi holded 9,500 of the 40,000 shares. It had significant success manufacturing a range of automobiles, military vehicles and aero-engines. to found the SPA (Società Piemontese Automobili), His temperament brought him into conflict with the Board of Directors, leading him to leave the company in 1911. SPA company was bought by FIAT in 1926 although it continued manufacturing military and commercial vehicles until 1947 when it was fully merged in FIAT.

== Burial ==
Michele Ansaldi is buried in the famil tomb in Monumental Cemetery of Turin. Following his death, the family commissioned a funerary monument from the sculptor and foundryman Corrado Betta, who created a group of statues between 1915 and 1935. The family tomb is located in the Primitivo Est section, no. 395.

== See also ==
- Ceirano GB & C
- Itala, car manufacturer started in 1903 by Matteo Ceirano and five partners, from 1904 to 1934 based in Turin
