= Fiat 521 =

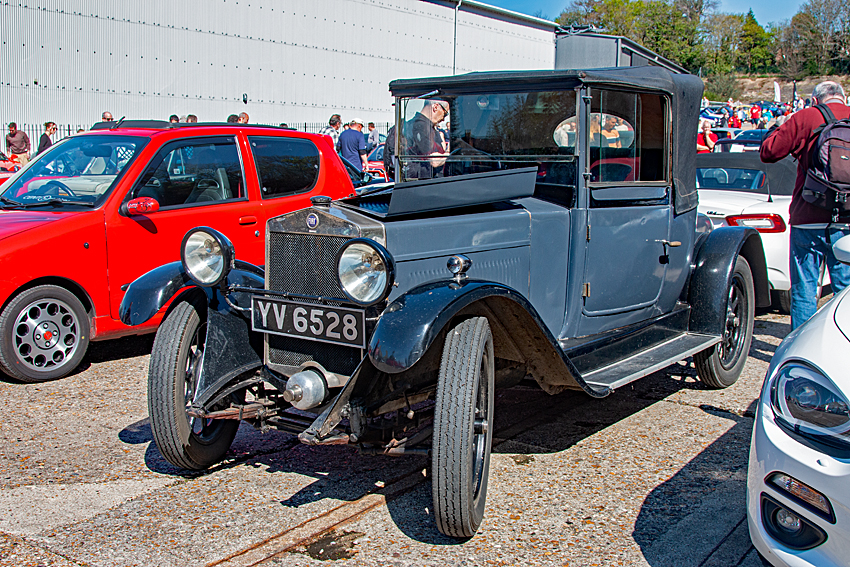
- 1928 Fiat 521 C Coupe at Brooklands

Overview
- Manufacturer: Fiat
- Production: 1928–1931

Body and chassis
- Body style: 2-door coupe 4-door sedan 4-door limousine 4-door cabriolet
- Layout: FR layout

Powertrain
- Engine: straight-6 2516 cc 50 hp
- Transmission: 4-speed manual

Dimensions
- Wheelbase: 314 cm (123.6 in); 290 cm (114.2 in) (521 C)
- Curb weight: 1,350 kg (2,980 lb)-1,450 kg (3,200 lb)

Chronology
- Predecessor: Fiat 520
- Successor: Fiat 522

The Fiat 521 is a passenger car produced by Fiat between 1928 and 1931. The 521 was derived from its predecessor model, the Fiat 520, but with a bigger engine and chassis. The 521C was a shorter variant. This car was produced outside Italy, most notably at the Fiat-NSU plant in Heilbronn, starting in 1930, setting Fiat on the path to its subsequent multinational status.

More than 33,000 Fiat 521s were produced in Italy and Germany.

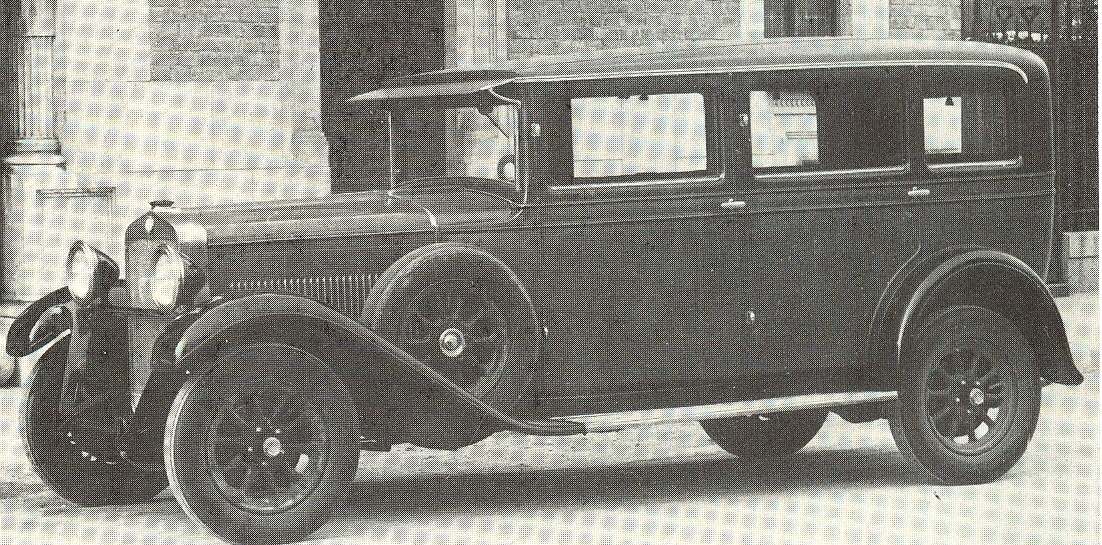
Fiat 521 Weymann-Sedan 1928

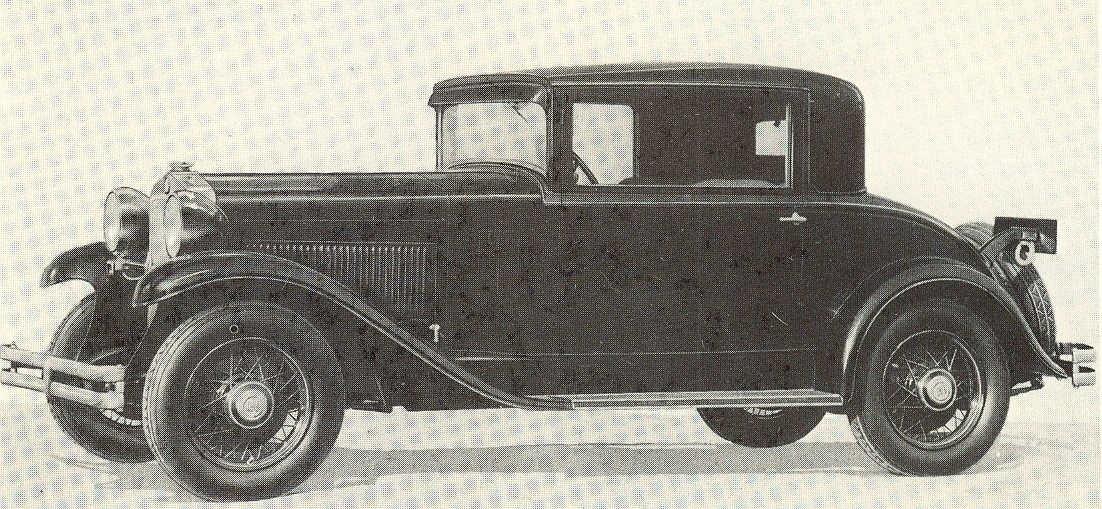
Fiat 521 C Coupe-Spider (1928)
