= Fiat 8 HP =

Car produced by the Italian manufacturer Fiat

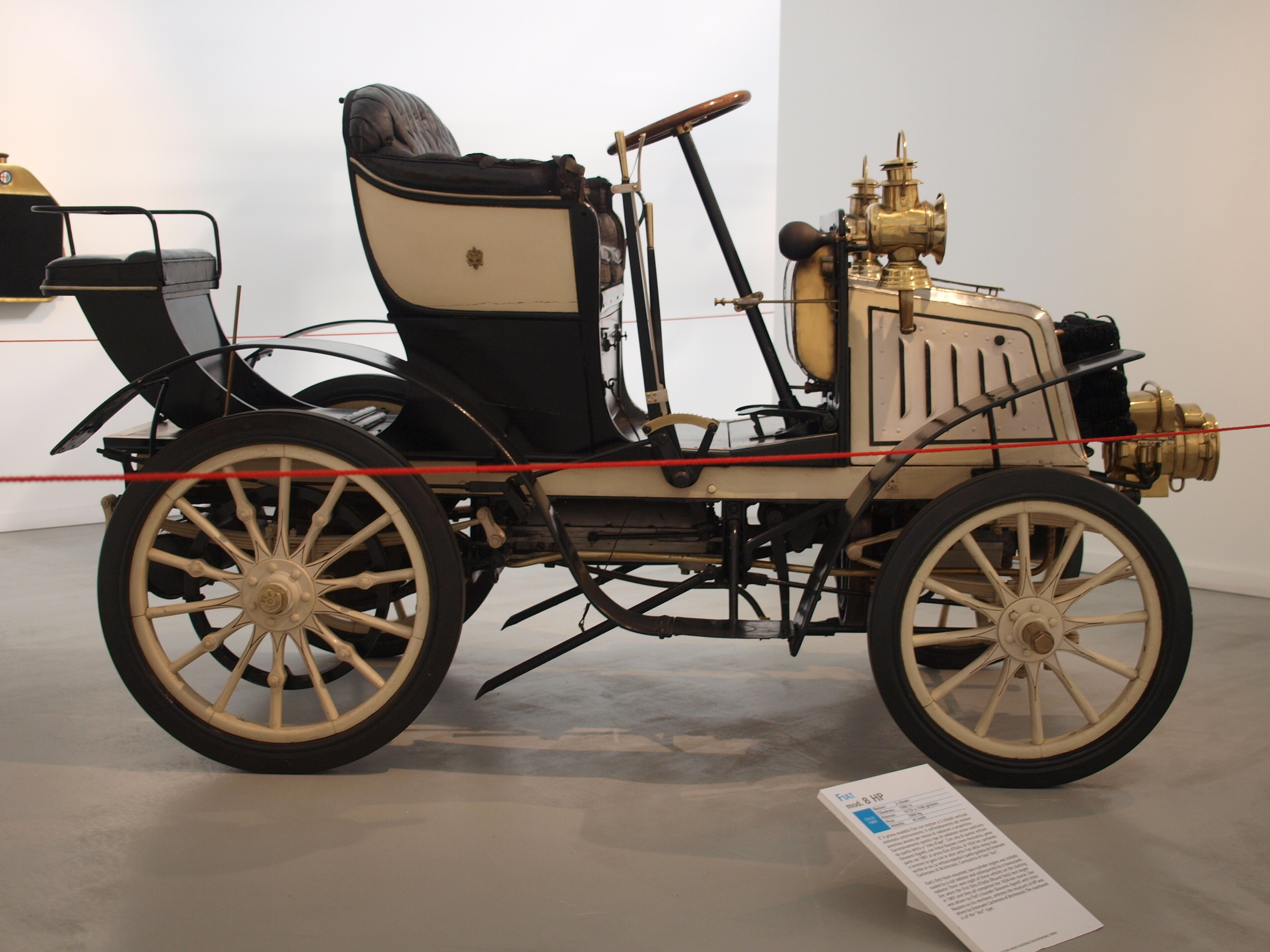

Overview
- Manufacturer: Fiat
- Production: 1901; 80 produced

Body and chassis
- Layout: RWD

Powertrain
- Engine: straight-2 1082 cc
- Transmission: 3-speed manual

Dimensions
- Wheelbase: 1,750 mm (69 in)
- Length: 2,810 mm (111 in)
- Width: 1,450 mm (57 in)
- Height: 1,620 mm (64 in)
- Curb weight: 1,000 kg (2,205 lb)

The Fiat 8 hp is a car produced by the Italian manufacturer Fiat in 1901. The car has a straight-2 engine rated at 8 hp and a top speed of 45 kilometres per hour (28 mph).
