= Fiat 10 HP =

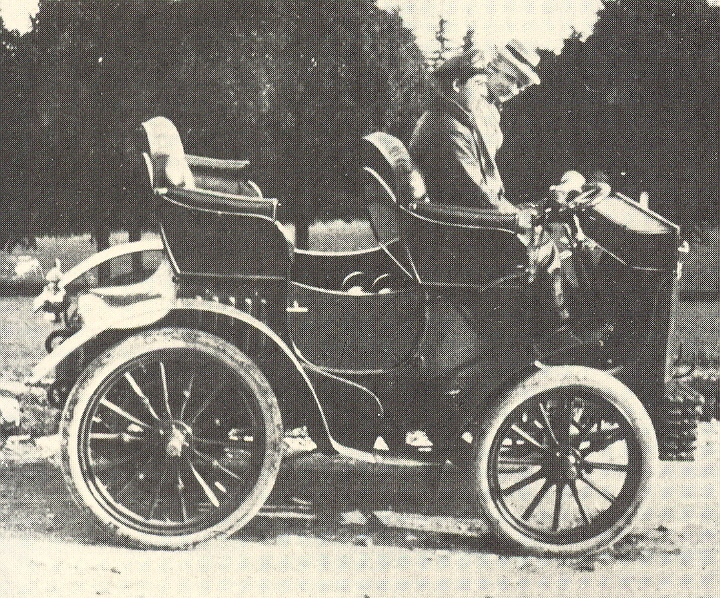

Overview
- Manufacturer: Fiat
- Production: 1901

Body and chassis
- Body style: 4-seater
- Layout: RWD

Powertrain
- Engine: straight-2 1082 cc

Dimensions
- Wheelbase: 1,750 mm (69 in)
- Length: 2,810 mm (111 in)
- Curb weight: 1,150 kg (2,535 lb)

The Fiat 10 HP was the fifth model of the Italian car manufacturer Fiat, produced in 1901. Together with the Fiat 8 HP, it replaced the Fiat 6 HP, being an evolution of this model. The Fiat 6 HP had in turn been based on the Fiat 3.5 HP designed for FIAT by engineer Aristide Faccioli. Both the 6 HP and the 10 HP were also designed by Faccioli. The technology remained the same. However, the seating layout was changed: while the 6 HP offered vis-à-vis seating, the 10 HP was a Phaeton with two rows of seats.

While the 8 HP was specifically developed for commercial use as a taxi, there still were few private buyers for automobiles.

Like the 6 HP model, the 10 HP had a 2-cylinder petrol engine with 1082 cc with two valves per cylinder. This allowed a maximum power of 10 PS. The drive was via a 3-speed manual transmission with chain drive on the rear wheels. While a steering wheel (instead of a tiller bar) was only available as an option for the 6 HP, it was standard on the 10 HP. The price for a 10 HP with standard equipment amounted to 9,000 Italian lira. Probably due to the increase in consumption due to the higher weight the model was not a success for Fiat. Instead of 20 6 HP models, only 3 or 5 examples, depending on source, were built. In 1901 a successor model for both the 10 HP and the 8 HP was introduced, the Fiat 12 HP.

The car had a straight-2 engine with 10 bhp (7.5 kW) and a top speed of 45 kilometres per hour (28 mph).
