= Fiat 510 =

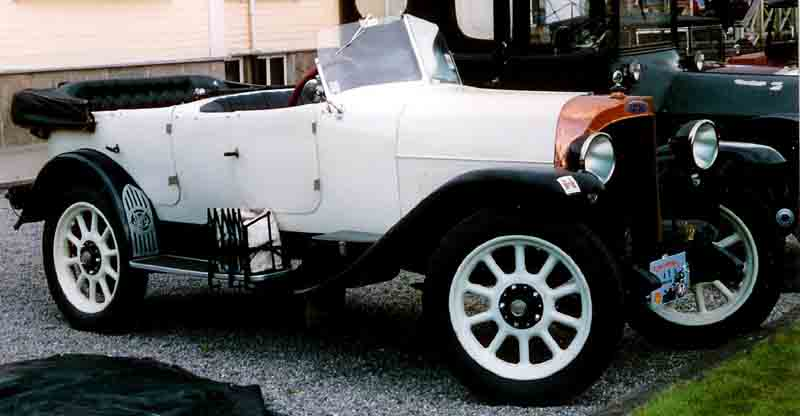
- Fiat 510S 1922

Overview
- Manufacturer: Fiat
- Production: 1920–1925

Body and chassis
- Body style: 4-door sedan 4-door cabriolet
- Layout: FR layout

Powertrain
- Engine: straight-6 3446 cc
- Transmission: 4-speed manual

Dimensions
- Wheelbase: 340 cm (133.9 in); 310 cm (122.0 in) (510 S)
- Curb weight: 1,550 kg (3,417 lb)

Chronology
- Predecessor: Fiat Tipo 7
- Successor: Fiat 512

The Fiat 510 is a passenger car produced by Fiat between 1920 and 1925. It was of a similar design than the smaller 501 and 505 models. Starting from 1920, a sports version 510 S with a more powerful engine and shorter chassis was made. Around 14,000 examples were produced.

== Engines ==
Model	Years	Engine	Displacement	Power	Fuel system
510	1920–1925	straight-6 sidevalve	3446 cc	46 hp (34 kW)	single carburetor
510 S	1921–1925	straight-6 sidevalve	3446 cc	53 hp (40 kW)	single carburetor

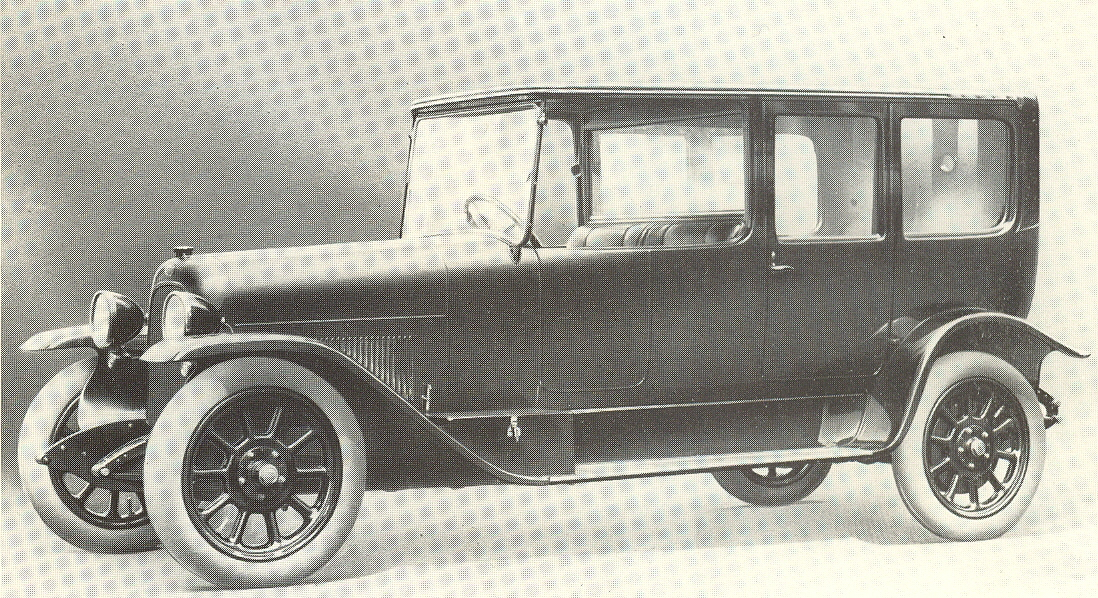
Fiat 510 Series1 1919
