= Fiat 512 =

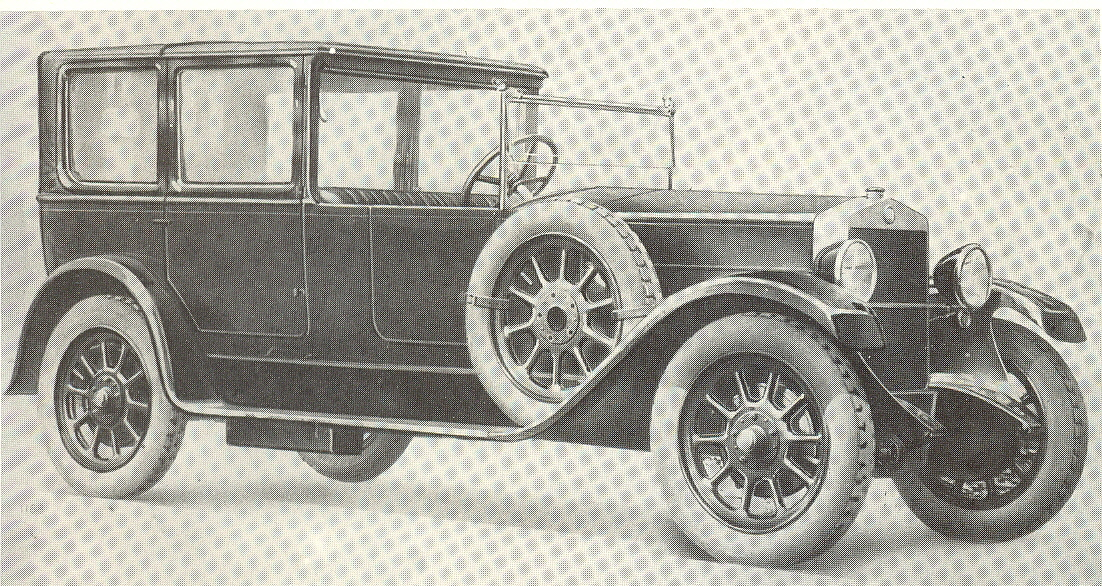
- Fiat 512 Landaulet 1926

Overview
- Manufacturer: Fiat
- Production: 1926–1928

Body and chassis
- Body style: 4-door sedan 4-door limousine 4-door cabriolet
- Layout: FR layout

Powertrain
- Engine: 3446 cc I6
- Transmission: 4-speed manual

Dimensions
- Wheelbase: 340 cm (133.9 in)
- Curb weight: 1,750 kg (3,860 lb)

Chronology
- Predecessor: Fiat 510
- Successor: Fiat 503

The Fiat 512 is a passenger car produced by Italian automobile manufacturer Fiat between 1926 and 1928. The car was developed from the 510 with modified suspension and brakes. The 3.4-liter straight-six engine produced 46 PS (34 kW).

It was produced in 2,600 examples.
