= Fiat 16-20 HP =

Fiat 16-20 HP Fiat 16-24 HP
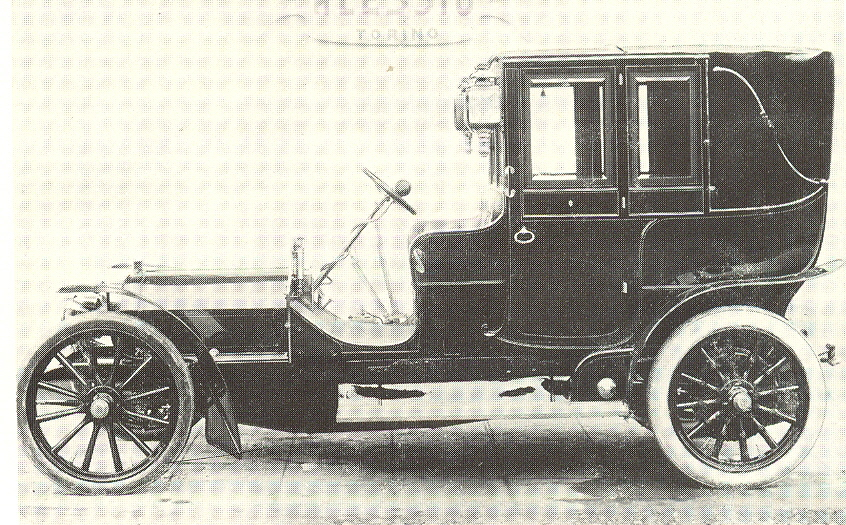

Overview
- Manufacturer: Fiat
- Production: 1903–1906; 691 produced
- Assembly: Corso Dante plant, Turin, Italy

Body and chassis
- Body style: Duc - Phaeton - Landaulet
- Layout: FR layout

Powertrain
- Engine: straight-4 4179 - 4503 cc

Dimensions
- Length: 3,250 mm (128 in)-3,820 mm (150 in)
- Width: 1,460 mm (57 in)
- Height: 2,350 mm (93 in)
- Curb weight: 950 kg (2,094 lb)-1,300 kg (2,866 lb)

Chronology
- Predecessor: Fiat 12 HP
- Successor: Fiat Brevetti

The Fiat 16-20 HP was introduced by the Italian manufacturer Fiat in 1903.

The car was built in several versions:

- 1st series in 1903, wheelbase of 2,120 mm (83.5 in) and a 4-cylinder 4179 cc engine - 20 PS - produced 100 copies,
- 2nd series in 1904, became the 16-24 HP, wheelbase increased to 2,585 mm (101.8 in) and 4179 cc engine had now 24 PS - produced 130 copies.
- 3rd series in 1905, it reverts to 16-20 HP with a wheelbase increased to 2,853 mm (112.3 in) - produced 171 copies.
- 4th series in 1906, with a new 4503 cc engine - produced 290 copies.

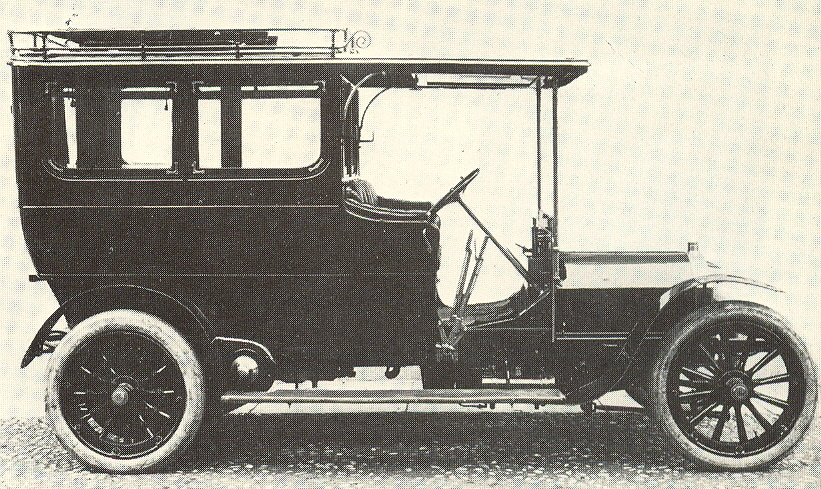
Fiat 16-24 HP
