= Le Blon (disambiguation) =

Le Blon was a French automobile.

Le Blon may also refer to:

- Hubert Le Blon (1874–1910), French automobilist and pioneer aviator
- Jacob Christoph Le Blon (1667–1741), painter and engraver from Frankfurt
- Pierre le Blon, Belgian fencer

== See also ==
- Blon (disambiguation)
- Franz von Blon, German composer and bandmaster
