= Vanderbilt Elimination Race =

Two races have been known as the Vanderbilt Elimination Race:

- 1905 Vanderbilt Elimination Race, won by Bert Dingley, was run to determine the American entries for the 1905 Vanderbilt Cup.
- 1906 Vanderbilt Elimination Race, won by Joe Tracy, was run to determine the American entries for the 1906 Vanderbilt Cup.
