= Blon (disambiguation) =

Blon or Blon' is a settlement in Belarus.

Blon or Blon' may also refer to:

- Blon, a villain in the list of Blame! characters
- Blon Fel-Fotch Pasameer-Day Slitheen, a criminal character from Doctor Who TV series

== See also ==
- Le Blon (disambiguation)
- Franz von Blon, German composer and bandmaster
- Blons
