= Owen Magnetic =

American brand of hybrid electric luxury automobile manufactured between 1915 and 1922

R. M. Owen Company Owen Magnetic Motor Car Corporation
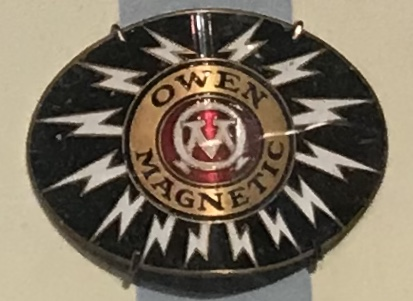
- The Car of a Thousand Speeds
- Company type: Automobile manufacturer
- Industry: Automotive
- Founded: 1915; 111 years ago
- Defunct: 1921; 105 years ago
- Fate: Bankruptcy
- Headquarters: New York City, Cleveland and Wilkes-Barre, United States
- Key people: Raymond Owen, Ralph Owen, Walter Baker, J. L. Crown
- Products: Automobiles
- Production output: 974 (1915-1921)

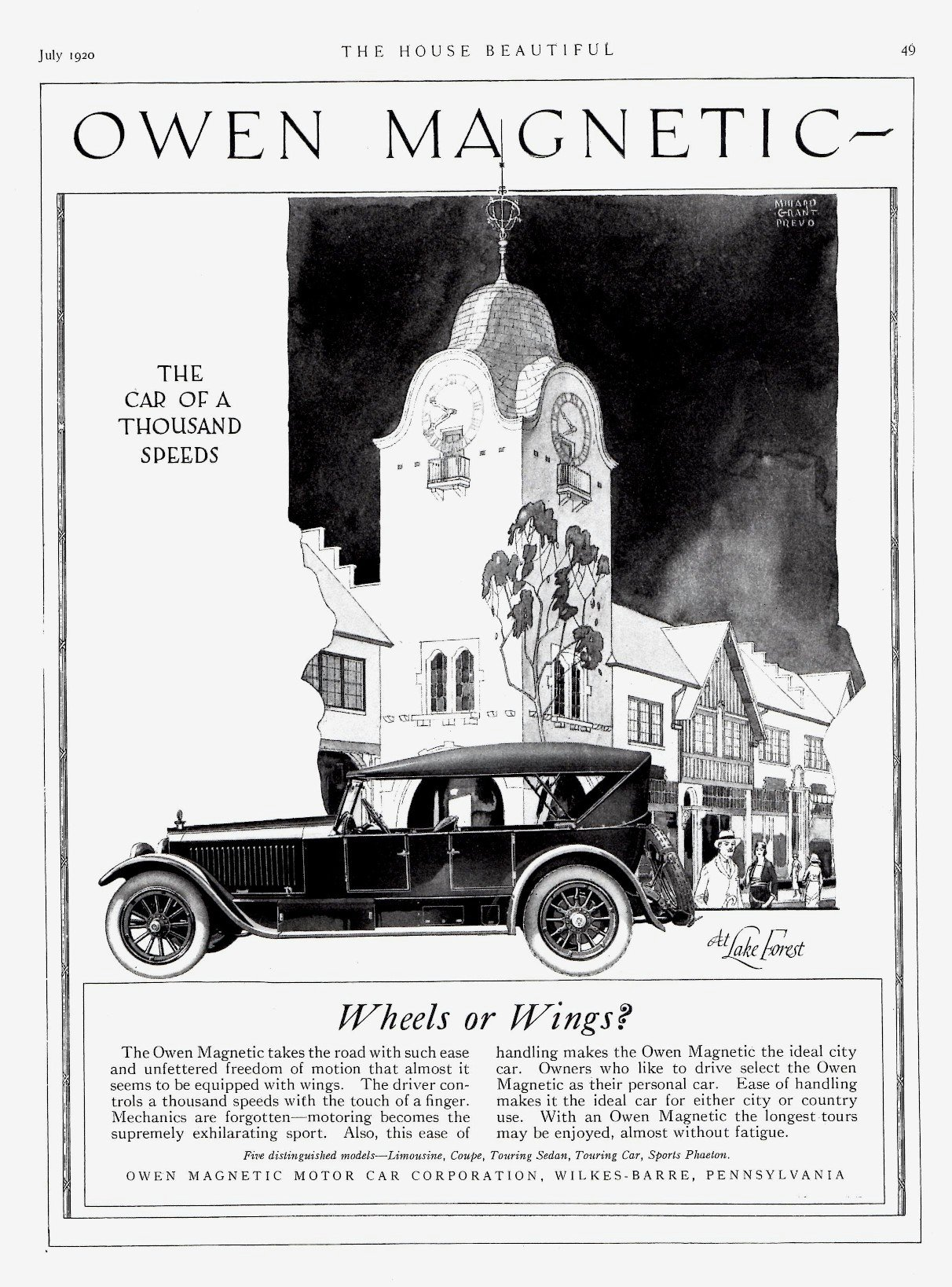
1920 Owen Magnetic Touring Car ad, from House Beautiful magazine

The Owen Magnetic was a pioneering American brand of hybrid electric luxury automobile manufactured between 1915 and 1922. Car models of the brand were notable for their use of an electromagnetic transmission and were early examples of an electric series hybrid drivetrain. The manufacture of the car was sponsored by R.M. Owen & Company of New York, New York. The car was built in New York City in 1915, in Cleveland, Ohio, between 1916 and 1919 and finally in Wilkes-Barre, Pennsylvania, in 1920 and 1921.

== History ==
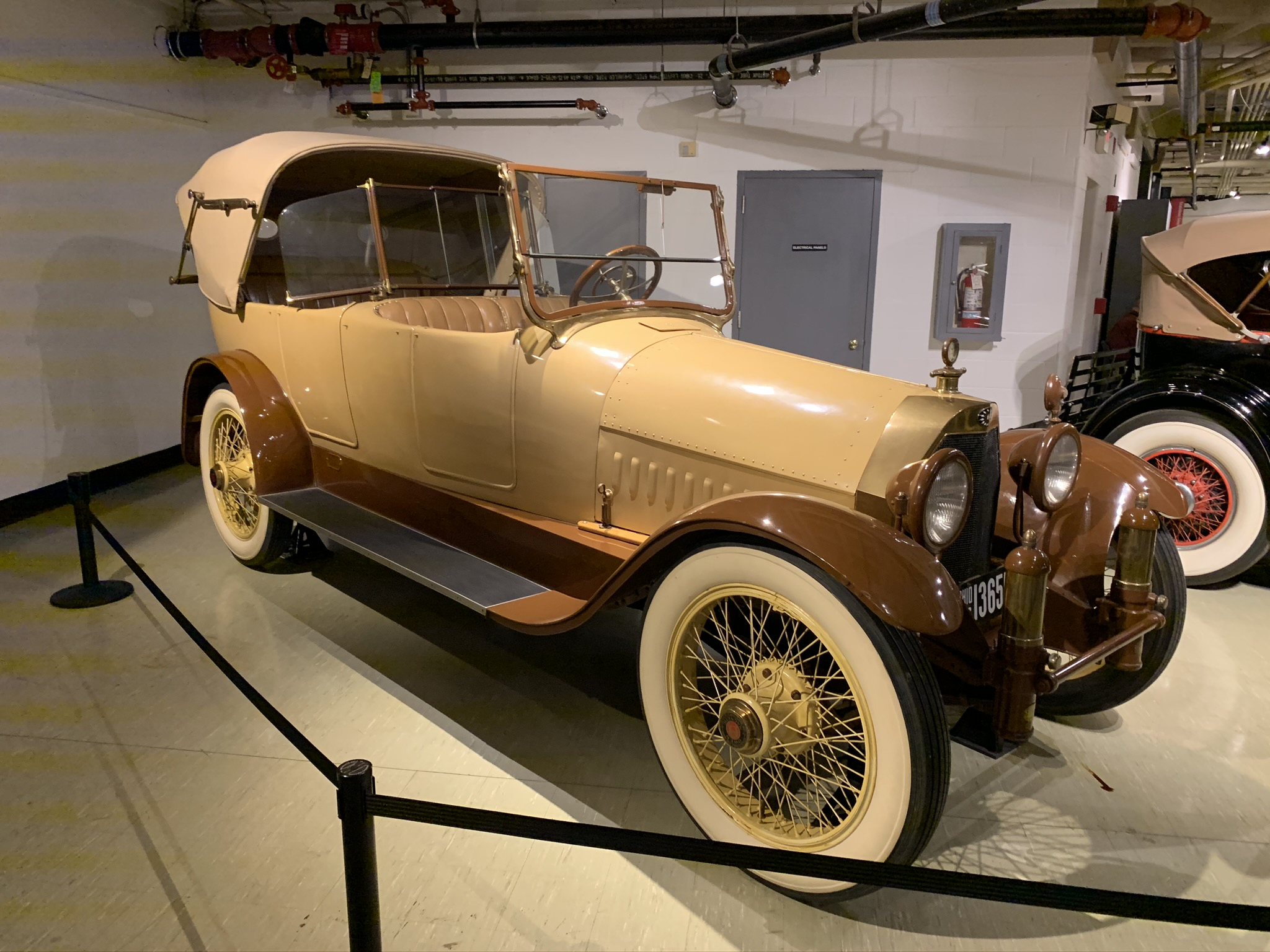
1916 Owen Magnetic at Crawford Museum

The first Owen Magnetic was introduced at the 1915 New York auto show when Justus B. Entz's electric transmission was fitted to the Owen automobile: "R.M. Owen have leased the large new three story fireproof building at the corner of Fifth avenue and One Hundred and Forty-second street, New York, where they will build the new Owen Magnetic motor cars." The former Owen plant still exists and is presently a self-storage facility.

Raymond M. Owen and his brother Ralph R. Owen had been working on the Entz transmission adapting it for a car since 1912. Justus Entz's drive train patent was U.S. patent 1,207,732. The Entz transmission had no physical connection between the gasoline engine and the driveshaft. Walter C. Baker, of Cleveland, Ohio, owned the patents on the Entz transmission, thus each of the 250 Owen Magnetic automobiles produced in New York was built under license.

Some sources wrongly state that the Woods Dual Power car manufactured by the Woods Motor Vehicle Company in Chicago also used the Entz transmission. The Woods Dual Power had a drive-train based on Roland Fend's U.S. patent 1,303,870, using a clutch between the gas engine and the electric motor.

The car became as famous as the company's clientele, which included Enrico Caruso and John McCormack. Owen Magnetics were advertised as "The Car of a Thousand Speeds". In December 1915, the company was moved to Cleveland when the R. M. Owen Company joined Walter Baker (of Baker Motor Vehicle) and the Rauch and Lang company. The Baker Electric Car company would produce the car, and Rauch and Lang would build the coachwork. Because of the combined resources, the Owen Magnetic increased its range of offerings for 1916 model year adding a Holbrook bodied sports tourer for $6,000, equivalent to $177,523 in 2025. Production continued through 1918, with prices ranging from $3,000 to $5,000 (equivalent to $147,936 in 2025), when Baker shifted its focus to war goods manufacturing.

J. L. Crown secured the rights to the Entz transmission and with Raymond Owen the company reorganized as the Owen Magnetic Motor Car Corporation based in Wilkes-Barre. The newly equipped factory was situated in the old Matheson works at Forty Fort, Pennsylvania. The Wilkes-Barre Times announced the resumption of production for January 1, 1920, with the aim of producing 750 cars that year.

=== Crown Magnetic ===
J. L. Crown who now owned the Entz rights, placed an order for 500 vehicles to be sold by Le Grice Elers, Ltd of London. Crown Limited of Great Britain was formed and the cars were named Crown Magnetic. However, by August 1920, before the order could be fulfilled, Owen Magnetic was in receivership. The Crown Magnetic was displayed at the London Motor Show in 1920, with about 20 imported before production ceased.

The Crown version of the Magnetic omitted the emergency low gear fitted on the Owen Magnetics. This turned out to be a mistake, as on a long steep hill, the force of gravity on this heavy car could defeat the transmission and could bring the car to a standstill.

== Design ==
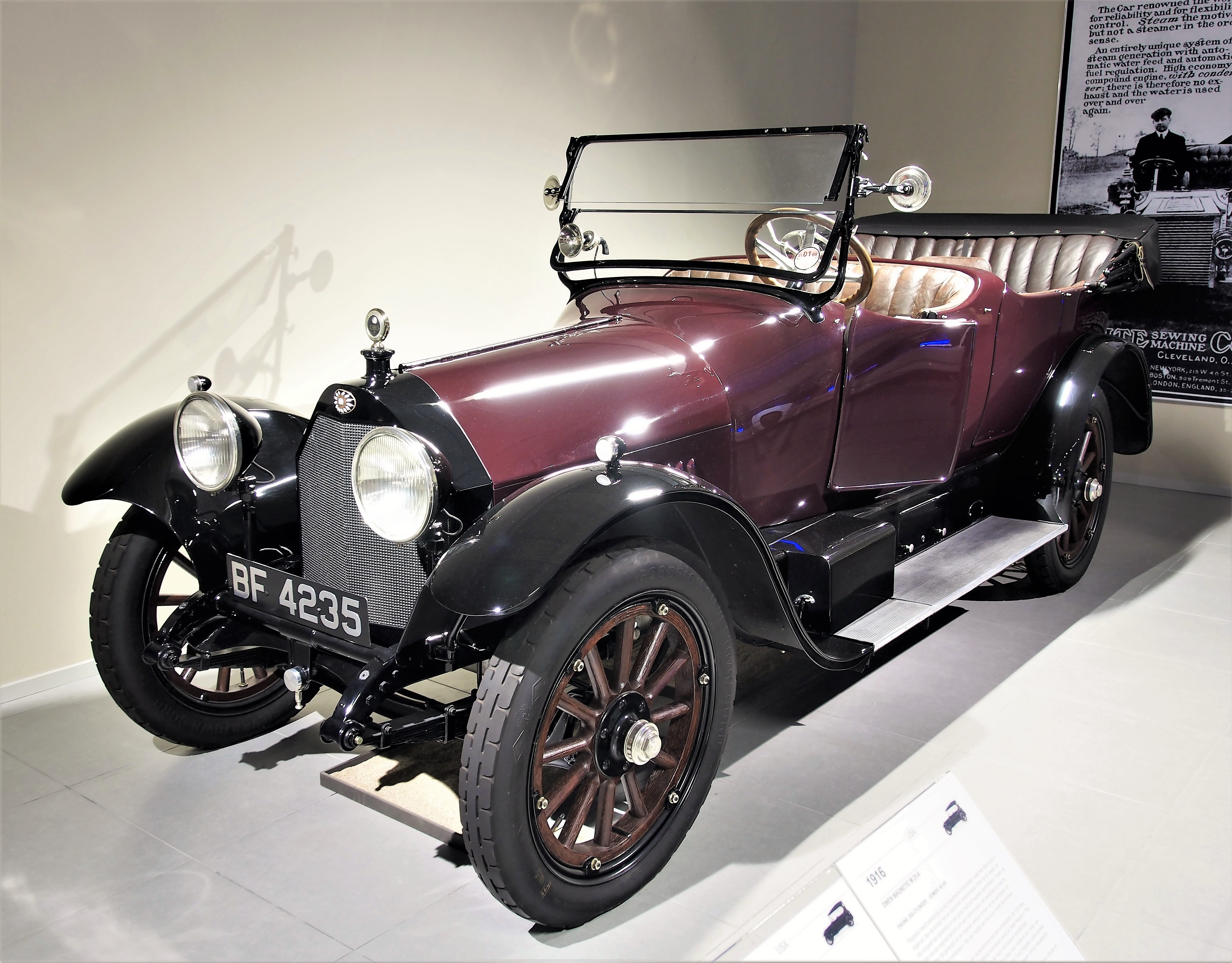
1916 Owen Magnetic M 25-4

The car was powered by a six-cylinder engine, but power was transmitted to the wheels based upon the same electromagnetic principle that propelled the Battleship U.S.S. New Mexico.

Automobile author Henry B. Lent described the drive mechanism thus:

The drive mechanism had no direct connection between the engine and the rear wheels. Instead of a flywheel, a generator and a horseshoe shaped magnet were attached to the rear of the engine's crank shaft. On the forward end of the car's drive shaft, was an electric motor with an armature fitted into an air space inside the whirling magnet. Electric current, transmitted by the engine's generator and magnet attached to the armature of the electrical motor, providing the energy to turn the drive shaft and propel the engine's rear wheels. Speed for the car was controlled by a small lever adjacent to the steering wheel.

== See also ==
- History of the electric vehicle
- List of defunct United States automobile manufacturers
