= Storero =

Italian car manufacturer (1912-1919)

Storero Fabbrica Automobili
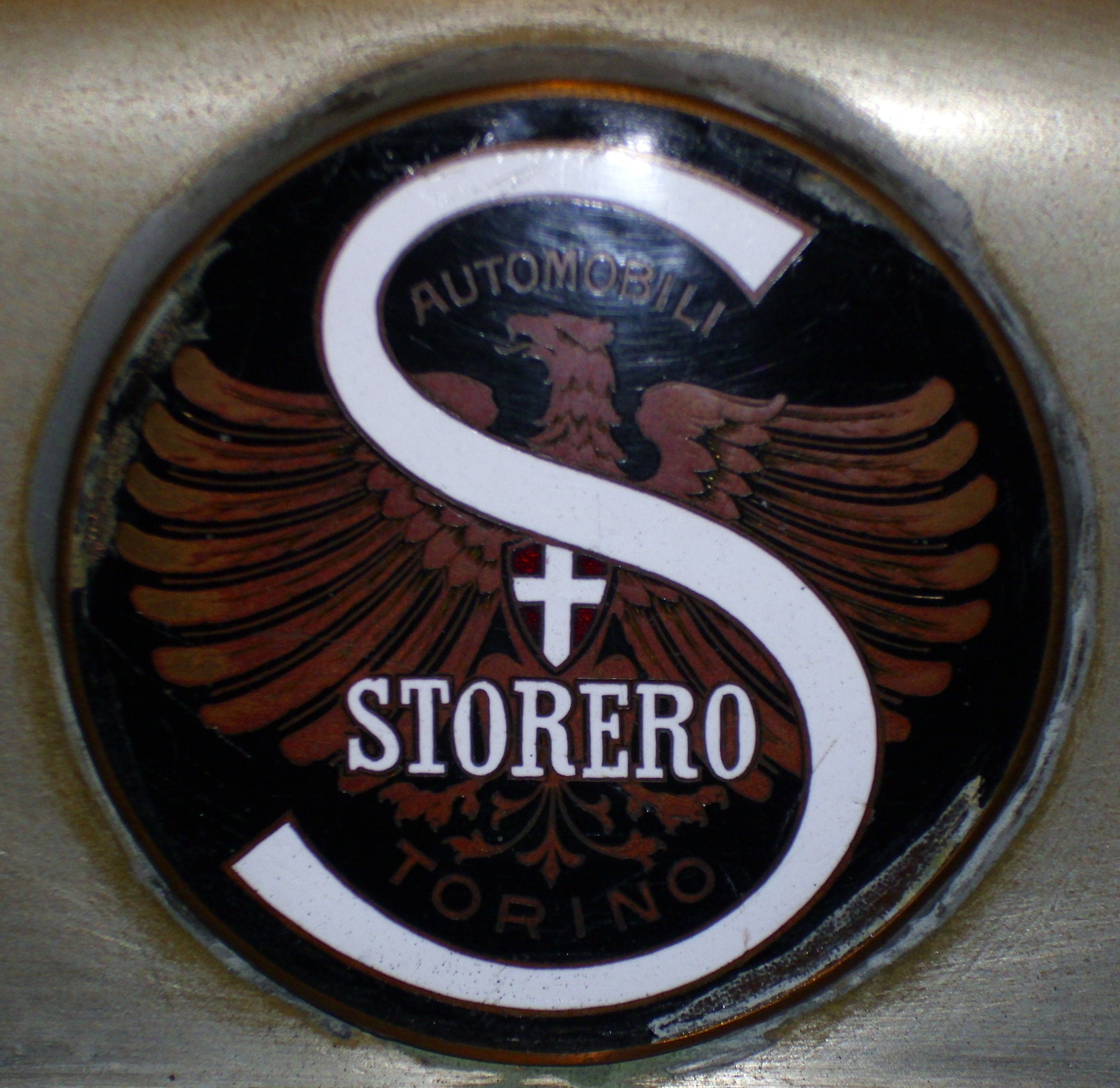
- Industry: Automotive
- Founded: 1912
- Defunct: 1919
- Fate: ceased production
- Headquarters: Turin, Italy
- Key people: Luigi Storero
- Products: Automobiles

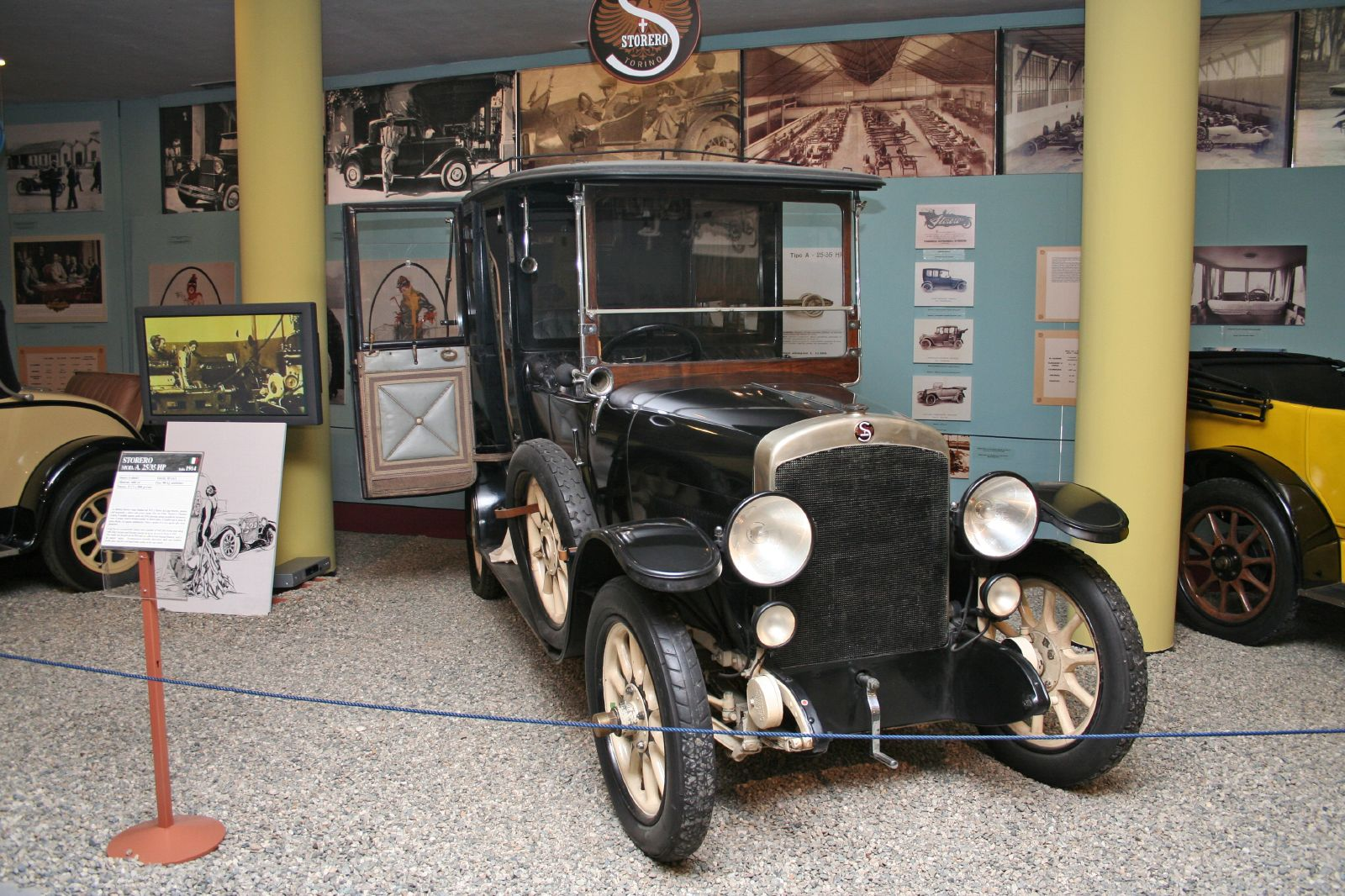
Storero Type A 25/35 HP 1914

Storero Fabbrica Automobili was a car producer from Turin Italy. It was founded by ex. Fiat racing driver and motoring pioneer of Italy, Luigi Storero in 1912. The company built four- and six-cylinder models until 1919.
