= Matheson (automobile) =

Defunct American motor vehicle manufacturer

Matheson Motor Car Company
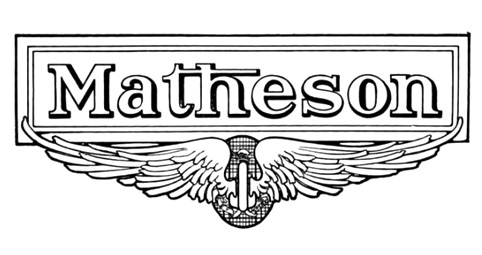
- 1910 Matheson Logo

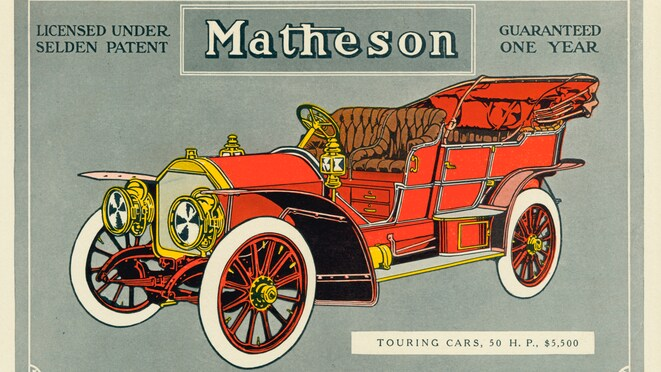
- 1908 Matheson Motor Car Advertisement
- Company type: Automobile Manufacturing
- Industry: Automotive
- Predecessor: Holyoke Automobile Company - Purchased
- Founded: 1903; 123 years ago
- Founder: Charles W. Matheson, Frank W. Matheson
- Defunct: 1912; 114 years ago
- Fate: Bankruptcy
- Successor: Factory - Owen Magnetic
- Headquarters: Grand Rapids, Michigan, Wilkes-Barre, Pennsylvania, United States
- Key people: Charles & Frank Matheson, Charles R. Greuter, L. D. Kenan, A. M. Dean
- Products: Vehicles; Automotive parts

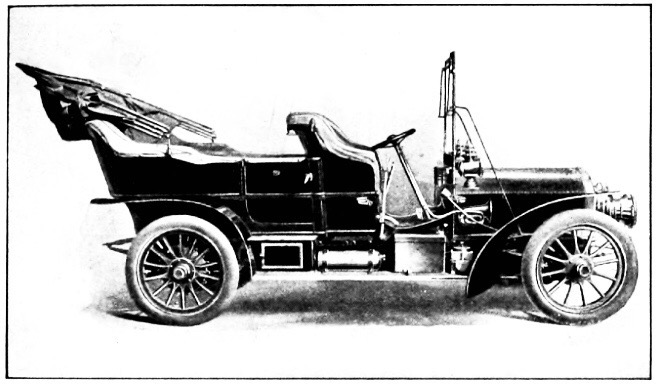
Matheson Four (1905)

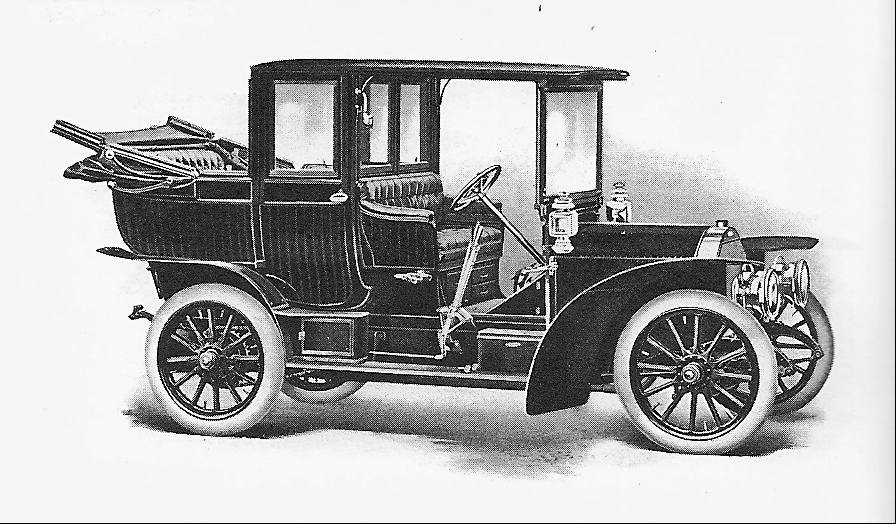
1908 Matheson Big Four Landaulette, $6,500

The Matheson was a luxury American automobile manufactured from 1903 to 1912, first in Grand Rapids, Michigan, then Holyoke, Massachusetts and from 1906 in a purpose-built factory in Forty Fort, Wilkes-Barre, Pennsylvania.

Matheson Motor Car Company president was Charles W. Matheson with Frank F. Matheson serving as Secretary.

== History ==
Charles W. Matheson and Frank W. Matheson of Grand Rapids, Michigan were mechanically interested in building engines and transmissions. They formed Matheson Motor Car Company in 1903. Matheson purchased the Holyoke Motor Works, and secured the services of the engineer and designer Charles G. Greuter. The brothers interests were in the overhead valve engine Greuter had designed, and Greuter became chief engineer of Matheson until 1908.

=== Grand Rapids and Holyoke ===
The first production of the Matheson Motor Car Company was shipped from Grand Rapids in July, 1903. Matheson built sixty automobiles in the first year, assembled in Grand Rapids from parts supplied from the Holyoke factory. In early 1904, Matheson moved the entire operation to Holyoke, Massachusetts.

The 1903-1904 Matheson's were seven-passenger touring cars which had a 96-inch wheelbase and were powered by a four-cylinder engine offering 24 horsepower. At $5,000, (equivalent to $179,167 in 2025), the Matheson was a high-grade, well built car, selling at the top of the American luxury car market. Charles Grueter's, technically advanced engine was designed with the overhead valves exposed under the hood.

In 1904 Matheson added a Big Four model of 48-hp, and the touring car was joined by a limousine body on a 106-inch wheelbase. The Limousine was priced at $6,000.

=== Wilkes-Barre and Forty Fort ===
The Board of Trade invited Matheson Motor Company to Wilkes-Barre, Pennsylvania. In March 1906 a new Matheson factory was opened in Forty Fort, Pennsylvania, and the company's offices were moved to the top floor of the new Second National Bank building in downtown Wilkes-Barre. Some 35 skilled employees transferred from the old works in Holyoke, Massachusetts.

In September 1906, a Matheson touring car set a world record for the mile in 50 seconds at Atlantic City. Matheson conducted an active racing program which included drivers such as Louis Chevrolet, Ralph DePalma, Frank Lescault and Ralph Mongini.

In 1908, Mr. Greuter left the company and French engineer L.D. Kenan was hired as his replacement. Kenan designed a new 50-hp six-cylinder engine for Matheson. In 1908 the Matheson had a 128-inch wheelbase and was powered by a 50 horsepower four-cylinder engine. Body styles included a 7-passenger tourer, a runabout, landaulet and limousine. Prices ranged from a low of $5,500 to $6,500.

In 1909, a six-cylinder engine was offered on a shorter 125.5-inch wheelbase, and produced 50 horsepower, the same as the four-cylinder engine. It was the lowest priced car in the lineup, selling for $3,000, equivalent to $107,500 in 2025.

A.M. Dean became chief engineer and improved the six-cylinder design now called the Silent Six engine. The 1911 Silent Six of 50-hp became the only car offered for 1912.

By 1909, nearly 400 workers were employed by the Matheson Company. Financial trouble caused Matheson to enter their first receivership in July 1910. They were rescued in November with a reorganization as the Matheson Automobile Company.

== Legacy and fate ==
A second receivership occurred in December 1912. The sale of the bankrupt company assets occurred on April 21, 1913. It was reported that 100 Sixes and 800 Fours had been produced all-together. Heavily discounted cars were being sold off by the receiver. A New York concern purchased the factory and tooling to handle production of munitions in support of the war effort. Frank Matheson remained with the company until 1914.

In 1919, Frank Matheson and the munitions company joined Owen Magnetic Motor Car Company who would occupy the former Matheson works. In 1920 they resumed production of the Owen Magnetic car.

The brothers would continue to be influential members of the automotive community. In the early 1920s, Frank purchased his old plant back and used it for distribution of Oakland, Dodge and GMC trucks. Charles had become vice-president of sales for Dodge Brothers and worked for Oakland when the Pontiac was introduced. He later worked in sales for DeSoto, and then general sales manager for Graham-Paige.

== Production models ==
- Matheson 40/45 HP
- Matheson 40/45 HP Touring Car
- Matheson 50 HP Touring Car
- Matheson Limousine
- Matheson 40 HP 1909
- Matheson Six Toring Car M
- Matheson 1910 E
- Matheson 1911 E
- Matheson Silent Six

== Gallery ==
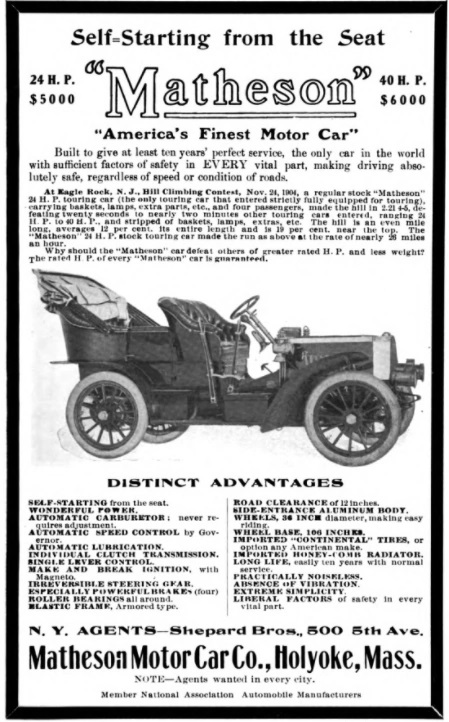
1905 Matheson Automobile Advertisement

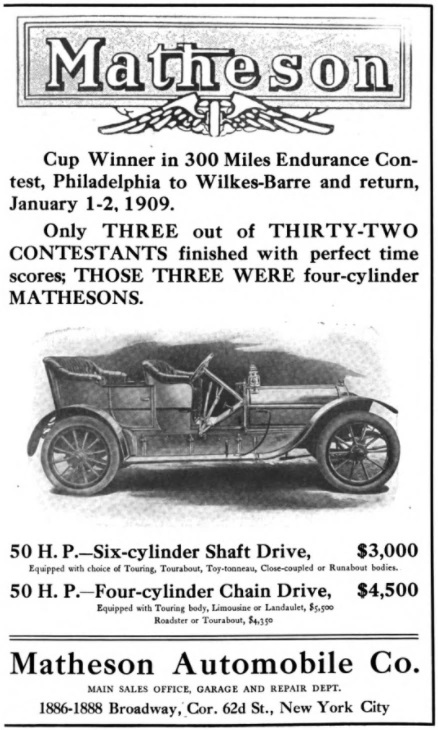
1909 Matheson 50 hp Six and Big Four Advertisement

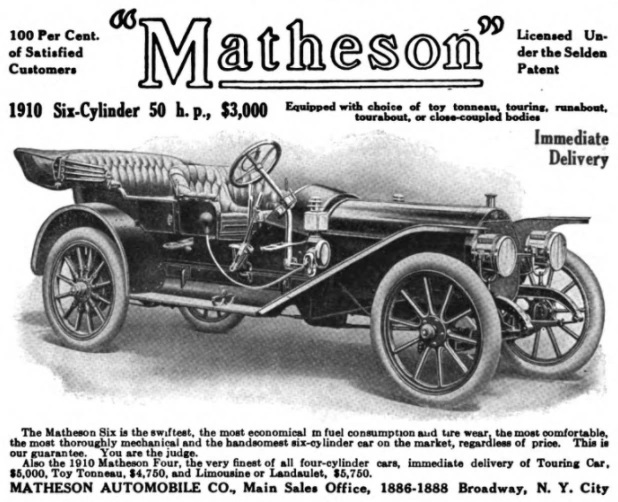
1910 Matheson 50-hp Six-Cylinder Advertisement

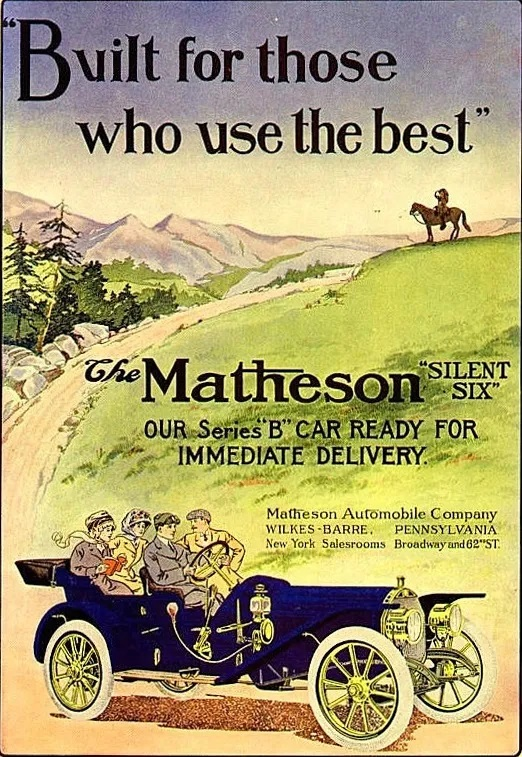
1912 Matheson Silent Six Advertisement

== See also ==
- Historic images from Matheson Automobile Company
- Holyoke Automobile Company
- Owen Magnetic
- Giants Despair Hillclimb
- 1906 Vanderbilt Elimination Race
- 1907 Matheson Big Four - ConceptCarz
