= 1906 Vanderbilt Elimination Race =

American auto race

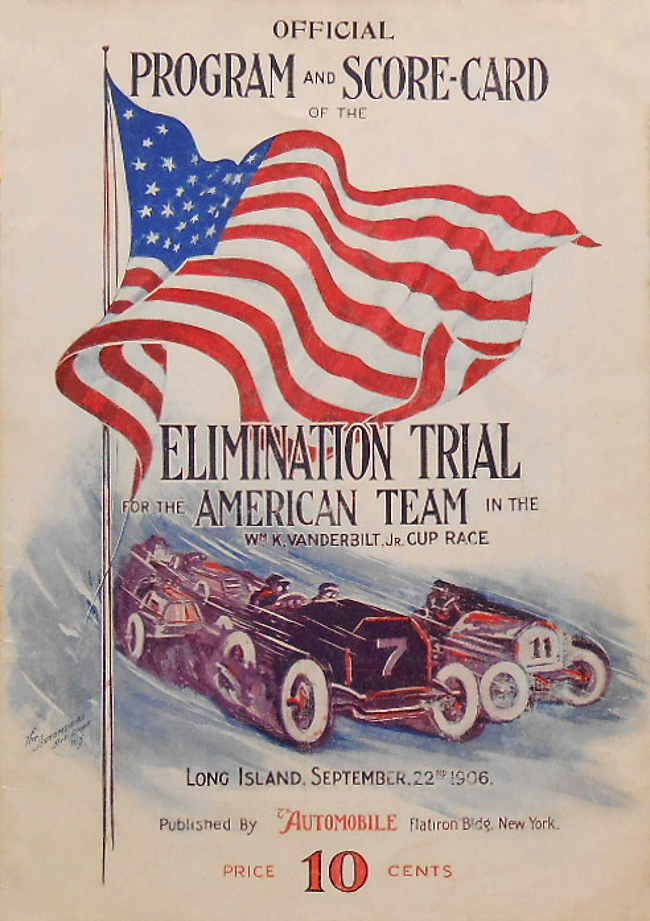
Program cover for the American Elimination Trial held September 22, 1906

The 1906 Vanderbilt Elimination Race was a motor race run to decide which five cars would represent the United States in the international 1906 Vanderbilt Cup.

The race was run on September 22, 1906, over ten laps on a 29-mile course near Westbury, Long Island, New York. "Crowded excursion trains followed one another from midnight until long after the race had started, discharging thousands at Mineola, Westbury, Hicksville and other stations about the course. Country people from miles around journeyed to the course until the multitude numbered more than 100,000. At least 5,000 automobiles, carrying gay parties of men and women lined the course." The race started at 06:00 in the morning with cars leaving at one-minute intervals. Mongini, Matheson, burst a tire on the first lap, hitting a telephone pole. He and his mechanic Green were thrown from the car but suffered only bruising. When Tracy crossed the finish line the race was stopped due to the crowd invading the circuit.

The following team was chosen to represent America: Joseph Tracy (90-hp. Locomobile), Hubert LeBlon (115-hp. Thomas), H.N. Harding (50-hp. Haynes), Frank Lawell (110-hp. Frayer-Miller), and J. Walter Christie (50-hp. Christie). "Only the first three covered the full course, and Lawell and Christie were given places on the team; the former because he was still running when the race was called off, and the latter owing to the disqualification of Lyttle (Pope-Toledo), for being towed." During the elimination contest: "Lawell was closely pressing Christie for the fifth place."

== Classification ==
Pos	No	Driver	Car	Laps	Time/Retired
1	12	(United States) Joe Tracy	Locomobile 90-h.p.	10	5h 27m 45s
2	6	(France) Hubert Le Blon	Thomas	10	5h 51m 25s
3	14	(United States) H. N. Harding	Haynes	10	6h 25m 39s
NC	2	(United States) Herbert Lytle	Pope-Toledo	8	+2 Laps
NC	5	(United States) J. Walter Christie	Christie	7	+3 Laps
NC		(United States) Frank Lawell	Frayer-Miller	7	+3 Laps
Ret	4	(France) Gustave Caillois	Thomas	5	
Ret	16	Richard Belden	Frayer-Miller	4	
Ret	7	(United States) Montague Roberts	Thomas	4	
Ret	1	Ernest Keeler	Oldsmobile	1	
Ret	3	Ralph Mongini	Matheson	0	Burst tire
Ret	8	(United States) Lee Frayer	Frayer-Miller	0	
