= 1906 Vanderbilt Cup =

American auto race

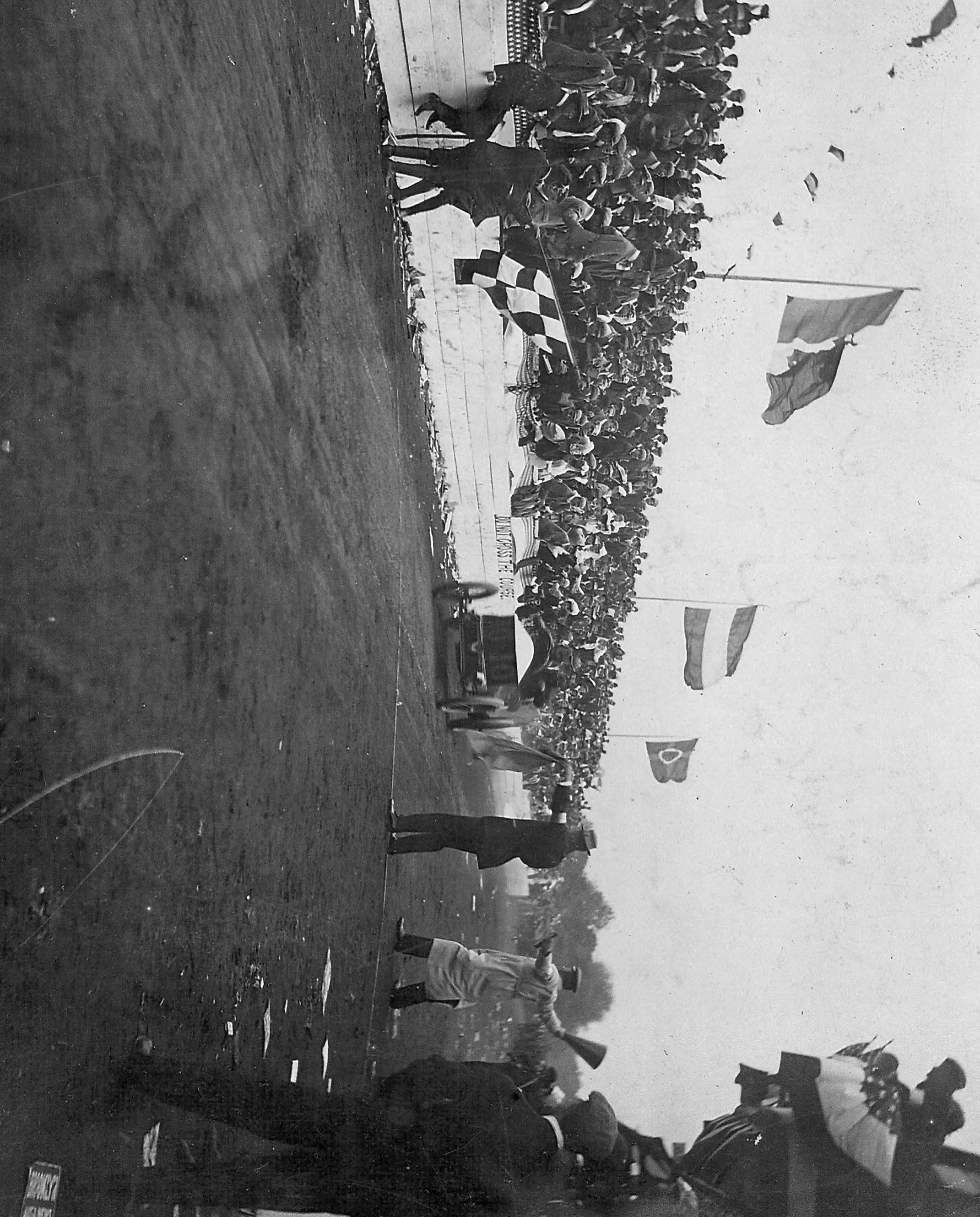
Photo of the finish. This is the first photographic record of a checkered flag finish, which had been introduced earlier that same year at the Glidden Tour.

The 1906 Vanderbilt Cup was a motor race held on a 29.7 mile street circuit on Long Island, New York on October 6, 1906.

Just like the 1906 Vanderbilt Elimination Race, this race was stopped as the crowd invaded the course.

== Classification ==
Pos	No	Driver	Car	Laps	Time/Retired
1	10	(France) Louis Wagner	Darracq 120 hp	10	4h50m10.0
2	4	(Italy) Vincenzo Lancia	Fiat 130 hp	10	4h53m28.0
3	18	(Belgium) Arthur Duray	Lorraine-Dietrich	10	4h53m44.0
4	15	(France) Albert Clément	Clément-Bayard 100 hp	10	5h01m59.8
5	3	(Belgium) Camille Jenatzy	Mercedes 120	10	5h04m38.0
6	8	(Italy) Felice Nazzaro	Fiat 130 hp	9	+ 1 Lap
7	12	(Italy) Alessandro Cagno	Itala 120 hp	9	+ 1 Lap
8	1	(France) Hubert Le Blon	Thomas	9	+ 1 Lap
9	2	(United States) George Heath	Panhard 130	8	+ 2 Laps
10	9	(United States) Joe Tracy	Locomobile	8	+ 2 Laps
11	7	(United States) Karl Klaus Luttgen	Mercedes 120	8	+ 2 Laps
12	19	(France) Maurice Fabry	Itala 120 hp	7	+ 3 Laps
13	17	(United States) J. Walter Christie	Christie	7	+ 3 Laps
14	14	(United States) H.N. Harding	Haynes	7	+ 3 Laps
Ret	6	(United States) Elliott Shepard	Hotchkiss HH	6	Crankshaft
Ret	5	(United States) Frank Lawell	Frayer-Miller	4	Fan
Ret	16	(Germany) Aldo Weilschott	FIAT 130 hp	0	Crash
DNS	11	(United States) Foxhall P. Keene	Mercedes 120		Entry withdrawn

== See also ==
- 1906 Vanderbilt Elimination Race
