= Holyoke Automobile Company =

Defunct American motor vehicle manufacturer

Holyoke
- Industry: Automobile
- Founded: 1899; 127 years ago
- Defunct: (acquired by the Matheson Motor Car) 1903; 123 years ago
- Fate: Sold
- Headquarters: Holyoke, Massachusetts, United States
- Products: Vehicles

Holyoke Touring Surrey (1901) 3861 cc

Holyoke Motor Works plant

Holyoke was an American automobile company started in Holyoke, Massachusetts in 1899. The first car had a two-cylinder, 7 hp motor. The cars were designed by Charles Robert Greuter, born Philadelphia, PA, March 26, 1861, and educated St. Gallen and Winterthur, Switzerland. Charles R. Greuter, the mechanical engineer who was employed at Columbia Stoker Works in Holyoke, Massachusetts in October 1898, built his second gasoline car. The first one, which was purely an experimental project, was built to demonstrate the reliability of his engine, which also worked successfully. The vehicle, weighing 450 kg, easily drove through the hilly area around Holyoke. The three-horsepower Greuter engine was a two-cylinder gasoline engine and weighed 80 kg. Its speed could be varied from 60 to 700 revolutions per minute. In 1900 the Springfield Republican reported: "The president of the Holyoke motor works is Charles R. Greuter, who started the business of making gasoline carriages and wagons about a year ago in the old Standard machine company building, and at present employs about 40 men." At the beginning of 1899, the newly founded Holyoke Automobile Company was able to sign a contract with Viscount de Jotemps, who needed three vehicles for his sales in Europe. A maximum of 60 days was planned for the production of the vehicles in order to meet the shipping date. In April 1899, Holyoke Motor Works in Holyoke, Massachusetts set up their new factory at the corner of Sargent and Commercial Street with all the necessary machines to produce ten cars per month. In 1903 the company was acquired by the Matheson Motor Car company. Greuter then served as a director of that company.

== See also ==
- Matheson (automobile)
