= Luigi Storero =

Italian racecar driver and engineer

Luigi Storero (18 October 1868 – 1956) was an Italian racecar driver and engineer.

== Life ==
He was born in Turin. He joined his father, Giacomo Storero's company (established in 1850), which began making bicycles in 1884. Luigi Storero was a winner of bicycle races in 1887 and was involved in the selling of foreign makes. A workshop was set up in Corso Valentino.

However, he is best known for his involvement in automobile racing. He won the 1898 Turin–Asti-Alessandria in a De Dion Bouton tricycle. In 1899, he used this car to win the Brescia-Cremona-Mantua-Verona. Along with his hometown friends Giovanni Agnelli and Carlo Biscaretti di Ruffia, Luigi Storero raced his make, the Phénix 1.75HP tricycle; he won the 1899 Piacenza-Cremona-Borga-Cremona race. Among the engineers in Storero's workshop was the very young apprentice, Alessandro Cagno.

Driving Agnelli's Fiat 12HP, Storero won the Saluzzo Sprint in 1901 and the Targa Rignano in 1902. In 1905, he established the Società garage Ruiniti Fiat-Alberti-Storero, a Fiat garage that was taken over by Fiat in 1908. He left in 1910 and established the Storero Fabbrica Automobili carmaker in via Madame Cristina, which was active from 1912 to 1919.
