= 1906 Targa Florio =

Motorist road race

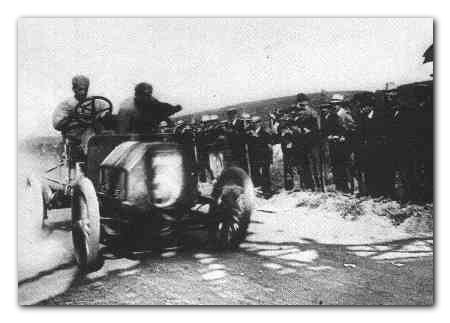
Alessandro Cagno drives Itala No3 to victory at the inaugural Targa Florio in 1906

The 1906 Targa Florio was the inaugural running of the Targa Florio, an open road endurance automobile race held in the mountains of Sicily near Palermo. Founded by wealthy Sicilian wine producer, Vincenzo Florio, it was held at Madonie on 6 May 1906 and run over 3 laps of the 92.473 mile circuit, totalling 277.42 miles.

The entry list was badly affected by a dock strike in Genoa but the race was won by the Italian driver Alessandro Cagno in an Itala.

== Results ==
Pos	No	Driver	Car	Laps	Time
1	3	(Italy) Alessandro Cagno	Itala 35/40 hp	3	9:32:22
2	10	(Italy) Ettore Graziane	Itala 35/40 hp	3	
3	5	(France) Paul Bablot	Berliet 24/40 hp	3	
4	9	(France) Victor Rigal	Itala 35/40 hp	3	
5	8	(Belgium) Pierre de Caters	Itala 35/40 hp	3	
6	2	(France) Hubert Le Blon / (France) Madame Le Blon (Riding mechanic)	Hotchkiss 35 hp	3	
dnf	7	(France) Maurice Fournier	Clément-Bayard 35 hp		
dnf	1	(Italy) Vincenzo Lancia	F.I.A.T. 24/40 hp		
dnf	4	(France) Achille Fournier	Clément-Bayard 35 hp		
dnf	6	(United Kingdom) George Pope	Itala 35/40 hp		

== See also ==
- 1907 Targa Florio
