= Hubert Le Blon =

French racing driver and aviator (1874–1910)

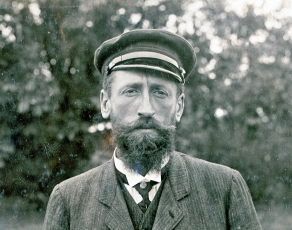
- Le Blon circa 1906–1910
- Born: 21 March 1874; Billancourt, Paris (or poss. Liancourt, Oise)
- Died: 2 April 1910 (aged 36); San Sebastián, Spain
- Cause of death: Plane crash during exhibition
- Occupations: Car-racer and Aviator
- Known for: Grand Prix racing Vanderbilt Cup racing Pioneering aviator Air speed record for 5 km

Hubert Le Blon (21 March 1874 – 2 April 1910) was a French automobilist and pioneer aviator. He drove a steam-powered Gardner-Serpollet motorcar in the early 1900s, and then switched to Hotchkiss for both the world's first Grand Prix at Le Mans in France and the inaugural Targa Florio in Sicily. At the Vanderbilt Cup races on Long Island he competed for the US driving a Thomas.

Within weeks of setting a new aviation speed record in Egypt, he died during an exhibition flight at San Sebastián, Spain. His first aircraft design, the "Humber monoplane (Le Blon type)", was displayed at the Olympia Aero Exhibition in 1910.

== Biography ==
Hubert le Blon was born at Boulogne-Billancourt, Paris, (or possibly Liancourt, Oise) on 21 March 1874.

His wife, Madame Motann Le Blon, shared his passion for motoring, regularly accompanying him as riding mechanic in his races, and watching during his flying exploits. Public statements in 1903 declared: "Madame Le Blon of Paris, has accompanied her husband on most of his record runs. [She] ... has entered her new Serpollet for the Nice races, in the coming spring, and hopes to travel at ninety miles per hour thereon."

Le Blon Frères of Boulogne-Billancourt, Paris, manufactured "Le Blon" and "Lynx" voiturettes from 1898 until possibly 1900.

== Sporting career ==
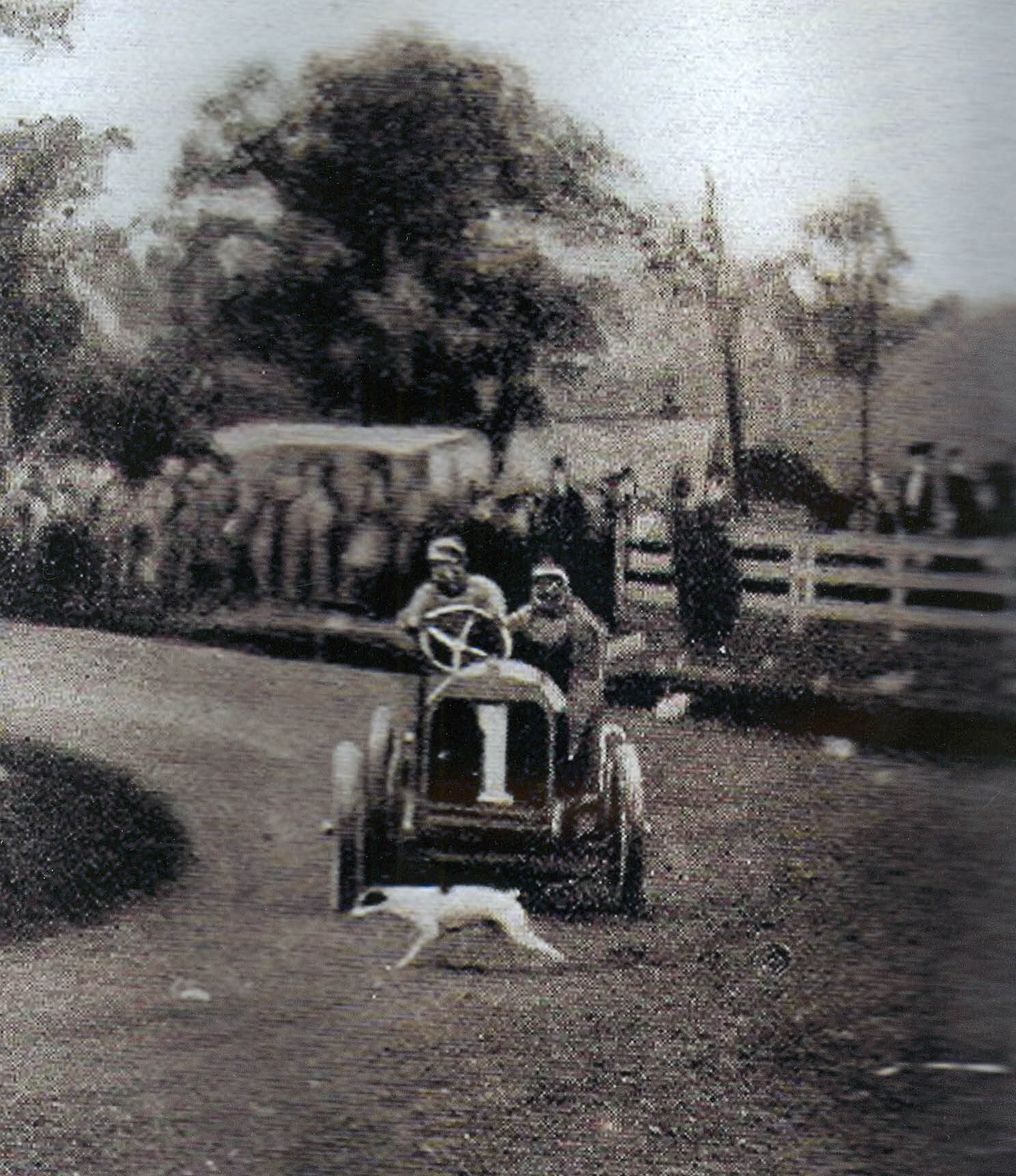
The 1906 Vanderbilt Cup at Long Island. Hubert Le Blon in an oversteering Thomas, the first car to start, encounters a dog.

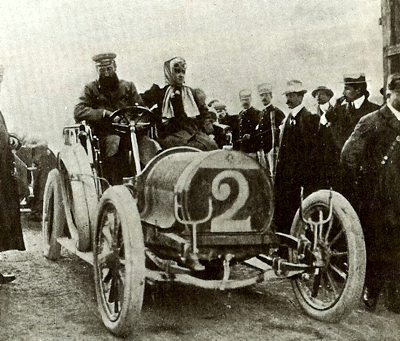
Hubert and Mme Le Blon at the 1906 Targa Florio driving a Hotchkiss 35 hp

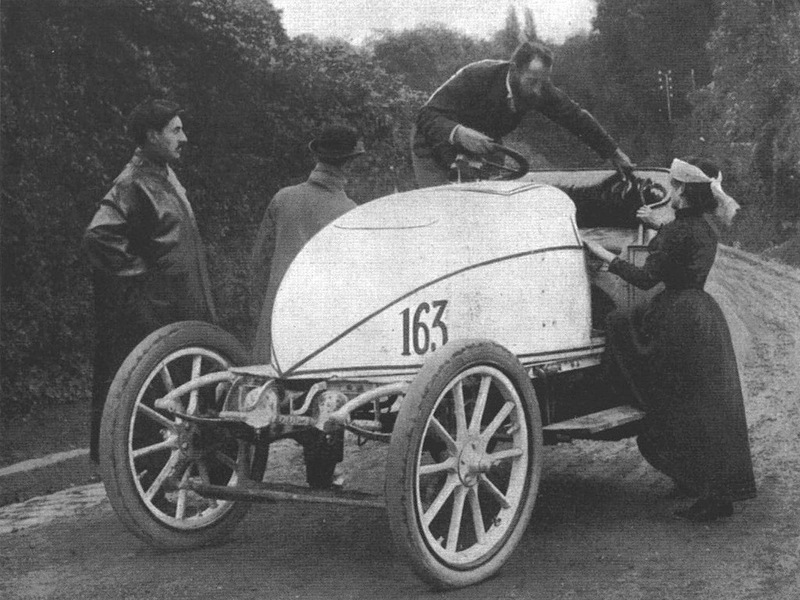
Hubert and Mme Le Blon with their Serpollet "Oeuf de Pâques" (Easter egg) at the Gaillon Hill climb in 1902

Le Blon raced a Gardner-Serpollet steam car and set several speed records over a five-year period. Some sources report that in 1901 he drove the Gardner-Serpollet steamer to seventh place in the Paris-Berlin trail, (possibly based on an erroneous claim in his obituary in the New York Times whilst others, including contemporaneous newspapers have no mention of him competing).

In the 1902 Paris Grand Prix (or Paris-Arras-Paris) he finished 13th in the same Gardner-Serpollet steamer.

In 1903 Paris-Madrid race he was classified 17th in his Serpollet (after 6 hours 44 minutes 15 seconds) when the race was stopped by the police at Bordeaux due to the number of fatalities. (This race is sometimes known by its post-facto rename of VIII Grand Prix de l'A.C.F.)

In 1904 he was fifth in the Circuit des Ardennes held at Bastogne circuit, in a Hotchkiss. He participated at the Arras Speed Trials in a Serpollet steamer.

In 1905 he was hired to race French Hotchkiss and Panhard cars, and in several races his wife acted as his riding mechanic.

In 1906 he drove a Hotchkiss in both the world's first Grand Prix at Le Mans in France and at the inaugural Targa Florio in Sicily.

In 1906 he was selected by the Thomas Motor Company to race as an unpaid amateur at the American Elimination Trial for the Vanderbilt Cup, having been an employee of the French branch of E. R. Thomas Motor Co. His second place qualified for the five-car American Team, but at the main Vanderbilt Cup race he only completed nine laps. His riding mechanic was Marius Amiel.

In 1907 he drove a De Luca-Daimler in the 2nd Targa Florio, finishing 20th, 1 hour 13 minutes after the winner Felice Nazzaro. On 2 July he was badly injured when he crashed his Panhard on the 4th lap of the Grand Prix de l'Automobile Club de France at Dieppe. This led to a long period of convalescence.

== Aviation ==
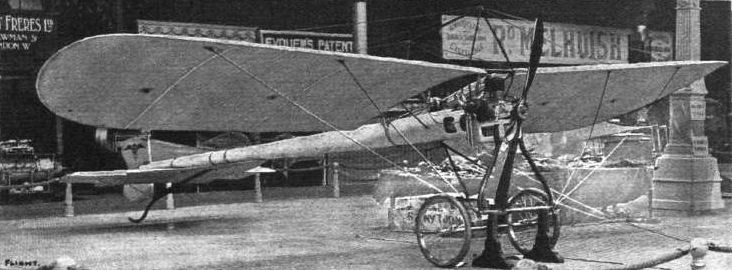
1910 Humber monoplane (Le Blon Type) - designed by Hubert Le Blon. Exhibited at the 1910 Olympia Aero Exhibition.

By 1909, like many other racers of the era, Le Blon became fascinated by aviation. He enrolled at the pilot training school of pioneering French aviator Léon Delagrange, learning to fly the Bleriot XI monoplane. Delagrange died three months before Le Blon, in an accident similar to the one that would kill Le Blon.

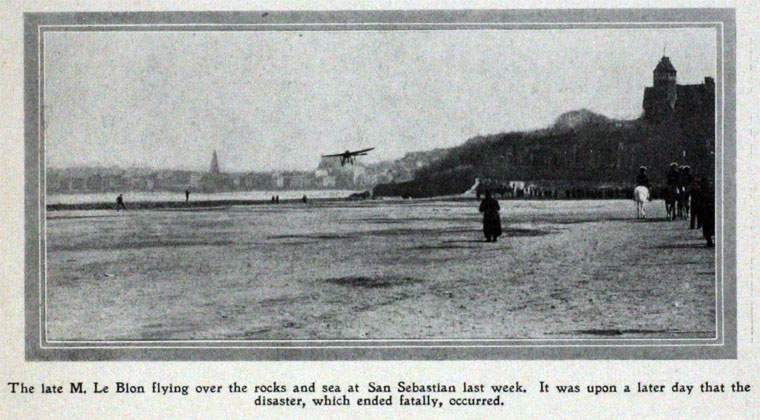
Hubert Le Blon flying a Bleriot XI at San Sebastián, Spain, March 1910

In 1909 Le Blon competed at the Spa aviation meeting in September–October before travelling to Doncaster, England, where he was the "first aviator to take-off at the first ever Air Show in Great Britain", held at the venue of the St. Leger Stakes. He rapidly became "as well known as Bleriot" for his skilled, daring and courageous flying, winning the Bradford Cup for the fastest ten laps of the course in his Blériot monoplane. He further endeared himself to the public on 25 October when he after taking off in very strong winds was hurled at the crowds by a strong gust, but manoeuvred to skim over the crowd, stall and then crash-land in a crowd-free area.

His renown as an aviator increased when, in February 1910, he set a new five-kilometre record of 4 minutes 2 seconds in his Bleriot XI monoplane at the Héliopolis International Air Meeting near Cairo, Egypt.

Le Blon's first aircraft design, the Humber monoplane (Le Blon type), was displayed at the Aero Exhibition at Olympia, London in 1910. Although the project showed creative ingenuity – he planned to sit astride it like a horse – the death of Le Blon led to its termination.

== Death ==
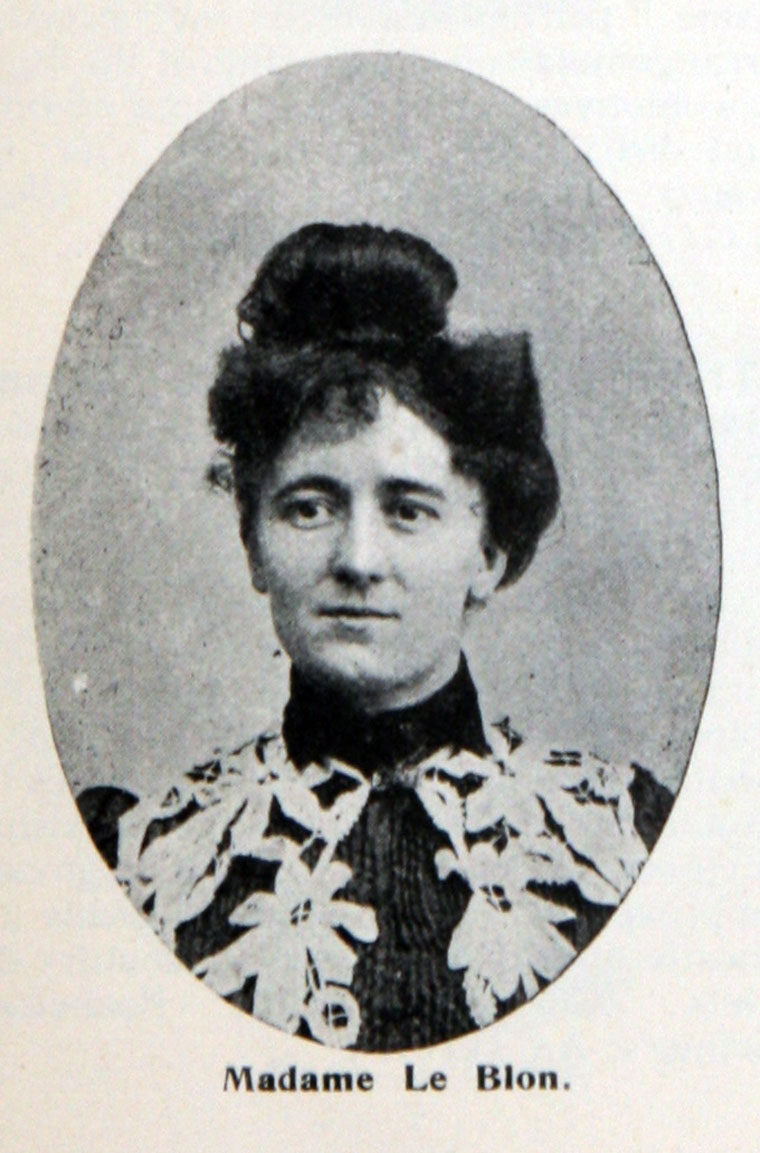
Madame Motan Le Blon - Wife and riding mechanic of Hubert Le Blon.

Le Blon drowned in a crash landing into the sea on 2 April 1910 while flying in stormy weather at Ondarreta Beach, San Sebastián, Spain, where he had been performing exhibition flights since 27 March. He was reportedly circling the Royal Palace of Miramar at about 140 feet when the Anzani engine failed; as he attempted to glide back to land, a wing's wire "stay" snapped whereupon the plane flipped and crashed into the sea upside down, possibly colliding with some rocks. His wife was among the crowd that was watching.

The New York Times headlined the story thus:

Aeronaut is dashed to death on rocks.

Le Blon, once famous motorist, was circling Spanish Royal Palace at San Sebastian.

His wife saw him fall.

The Motor failed and Machine Turned Turtle as Frenchman was trying to glide to Earth.

According to official documents the cause of death was "drowning" although his body was injured in the impact. The official cause of the crash was attributed to "fracture of one of the wing stay wires when running into a gust of wind".

His death was reported as the sixth person in history to die in an aeroplane accident. He was awarded an Aviator's Certificate by the Aéro-Club de France in 1910.

At his funeral in San Sebastián the streets were lined with troops, shops were closed, and thousands followed his coffin to the railway station where it was transported to Paris.

== Results ==
Year	Event	Date	Location	Distance	Result	# No.	Manufacturer	Time	Speed (km/h)	Notes
1902	Paris-Arras-Paris	15–16 May	Paris-Arras	864.35 km	13	75	Gardener-Serpollet steamer	18:45:45s		Subsequently named the VII; Grand Prix de l'A.C.F.
1902	Gaillon Hillclimb	21 September	Rouen	1 km	1		Gardener-Serpollet steamer	40.8s		
1902	Gaillon Hillclimb	12 October	Rouen	1 km	1		Gardener-Serpollet steamer	36s		
1903	Paris–Madrid race (Trail)	24 May	Paris- Bordeaux	552 km	17	119	Gardener-Serpollet steamer	6:44:15.8		First steamer to reach Bordeaux, where race stopped by police Subsequently named the VIII; Grand Prix de l'A.C.F. and Race of Death.
1903	Circuit des Ardennes	22 June	Bastogne	512 km (85.34 km x 6 laps)	5	26	Gardener-Serpollet steamer	6:31:03		
1904	Namur-Citadelle Hillclimb	29 August	Namur	2.8 km	1		Hotchkiss HH			
1904	I Eliminatoires Françaises de la Coupe Internationale; Gordon Bennett Cup	20 May	Forest of Argonne	532.79 km (88.80 km x 6 laps)	5	6	Gardener-Serpollet steamer	6:13:32		Did not Qualify for 1904 Gordon Bennett Cup
1904	III Circuit des Ardennes	25 July	Bastogne	591 km (118 km x 5 laps)	5	31	Hotchkiss HH	6:54:05		Fastest Lap: 1:09:44 (101.746 km/h) on lap 3
1905	II Eliminatoires Françaises de la Coupe Internationale; Gordon Bennett Cup	16 June	Auvergne	549.45 km (137.36 km x 4 laps)	7	5	Hotchkiss HH	8:13:13.8		Did not Qualify for 1905 Gordon Bennett Cup; Reg # 548 UU
1905	Circuit des Ardennes	7 August	Bastogne	591.255 km (118.251 km x 5 laps)	3	14	Panhard	6:22:56		
1906	Targa Florio	6 May	Sicily	446 km	6	2	Hotchkiss 35 hp			Riding mechanic - Madame Motann Le Blon
1906	IX Grand Prix de l'Automobile Club de France	26–27 June	Le Mans	1,238 km	dnf	12A	Hotchkiss 35 hp			Wheel problem
1906	Vanderbilt Cup; Elimination Race	22 September	Westbury; Long Island; New York	290 miles 29 miles x 10 laps	2	6	Thomas 115 hp	5:51:25		10 laps completed Riding mechanic - Marius Amiel.
1906	Vanderbilt Cup	6 October	Westbury; Long Island; New York	290 miles 29 miles x 10 laps	8	1	Thomas 115 hp			9 laps completed Riding mechanic - Marius Amiel.
1907	Targa Florio		Sicily	446 km	20	14C	de Luca-Daimler	9:31:32		3 car team entered by 'Societa Anonima Officine de Luca Daimler'
1907	X Grand Prix de l'Automobile Club de France	2 June	Dieppe	477.48 miles (47 miles x 10 laps)	dnf	PL1	Panhard			Crash on lap 3

== See also ==
- 1904 Gordon Bennett Cup
- 1905 Gordon Bennett Cup
- Le Blon – 1898 French motor manufacturer
