= Joe Tracy =

American racing driver (1873–1959)

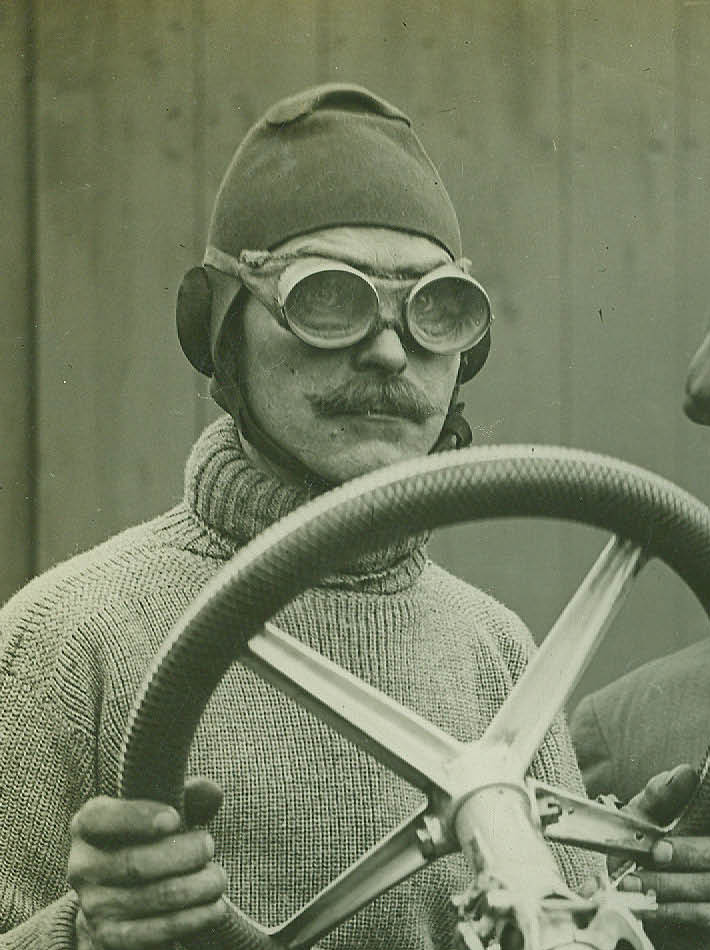
- Tracy at the 1905 Vanderbilt Cup
- Born: Joseph Tracy; March 22, 1873; Waterford, County Waterford, Ireland
- Died: March 20, 1959 (aged 85); Queens, New York, U.S.

Joseph Tracy (March 22, 1873 – March 20, 1959) was an American racing driver.

== Life and career ==
Tracy was born in Waterford, Ireland. A British subject, he emigrated to the United States at age 19, later becoming an American citizen.

Tracy drove a Locomobile in the 1905 Gordon Bennett Cup, but was eliminated by a stripped gear after two laps. He later competed in that year's Vanderbilt Cup race, finishing third - the best result for an American car in an international race up to that time.

Tracy won the 1906 Vanderbilt Elimination Race, qualifying him for the Vanderbilt Cup held later that year. He had good finishes in both the Vanderbilt and Bennett Cups, and retired from racing after the 1906 season.

Tracy was retroactively awarded a 1906 National Championship in 1951 by negationist sportswriter Russ Catlin.
