= Lee Frayer =

American racing driver (1874–1938)

- Born: Lee Ambrose Frayer; October 2, 1874 La Grange, Missouri, U.S.
- Died: July 25, 1938 (aged 63) Ravenna, Ohio, U.S.

Champ Car career
- 5 races run over 3 years
- First race: 1910 60-mile Race (Atlanta)
- Last race: 1911 Indianapolis 500 (Indianapolis)
Wins	Podiums	Poles
0	1	0

Lee Ambrose Frayer (October 2, 1874 – July 25, 1938) was an American racing driver who competed in the 1911 Indianapolis 500. Driving a Firestone-Columbus automobile, Frayer won a 100-mile race in Columbus, Ohio, defeating, among others, the great Barney Oldfield.

Frayer was born in La Grange, Missouri. His car participated in the 1906 Vanderbilt Cup with Frank Lawell driving.

Frayer participated in the 1911 Indianapolis 500 where he was injured. His relief driver was future World War I hero Eddie Rickenbacker.

Frayer died at Robinson Memorial Hospital, Ravenna, Ohio, on July 25, 1938, following an operation for appendicitis. He was buried in Maple Grove Cemetery in Ravenna, Ohio.

== Motorsports career results ==
=== Indianapolis 500 results ===
Year	Car	Start	Qual	Rank	Finish	Laps	Led	Retired
1911	30	26	—	—	13	126	0	Flagged
Totals						126	0	

Starts	1
Poles	0
Front Row	0
Wins	0
Top 5	0
Top 10	0
Retired	0
