= Le Blon =

19th century French car

Coordinates: 48.83499°N 2.25165°E

The Le Blon was a French automobile manufactured in Paris by Le Blon Frères (Le Blon Brothers) in 1898 or from 1898 to 1900. It was a voiturette similar to the Benz, with a 4 hp 'V' twin-cylinder engine and belt drive to the rear axle. Some cars were sold in England under the name "Lynx".

Le Blon Frères was based at (Maus, de la Forêt), 56, rue du Vieux Pont de Sèvres, Boulogne-Billancourt.

It is possible that 23-year-old pioneer motorist Hubert Le Blon was one of the brothers. After the Le Blon Frères business closed (1899–1900) he started to work with Léon Serpollet whose factory in the 18th arrondissement was about 10 km away. Le Blon competed in the Gardner-Serpollet steam car from 1901 onwards.
