= Alessandro Cagno =

Italian racing driver (1883–1971)

Alessandro Umberto Cagno
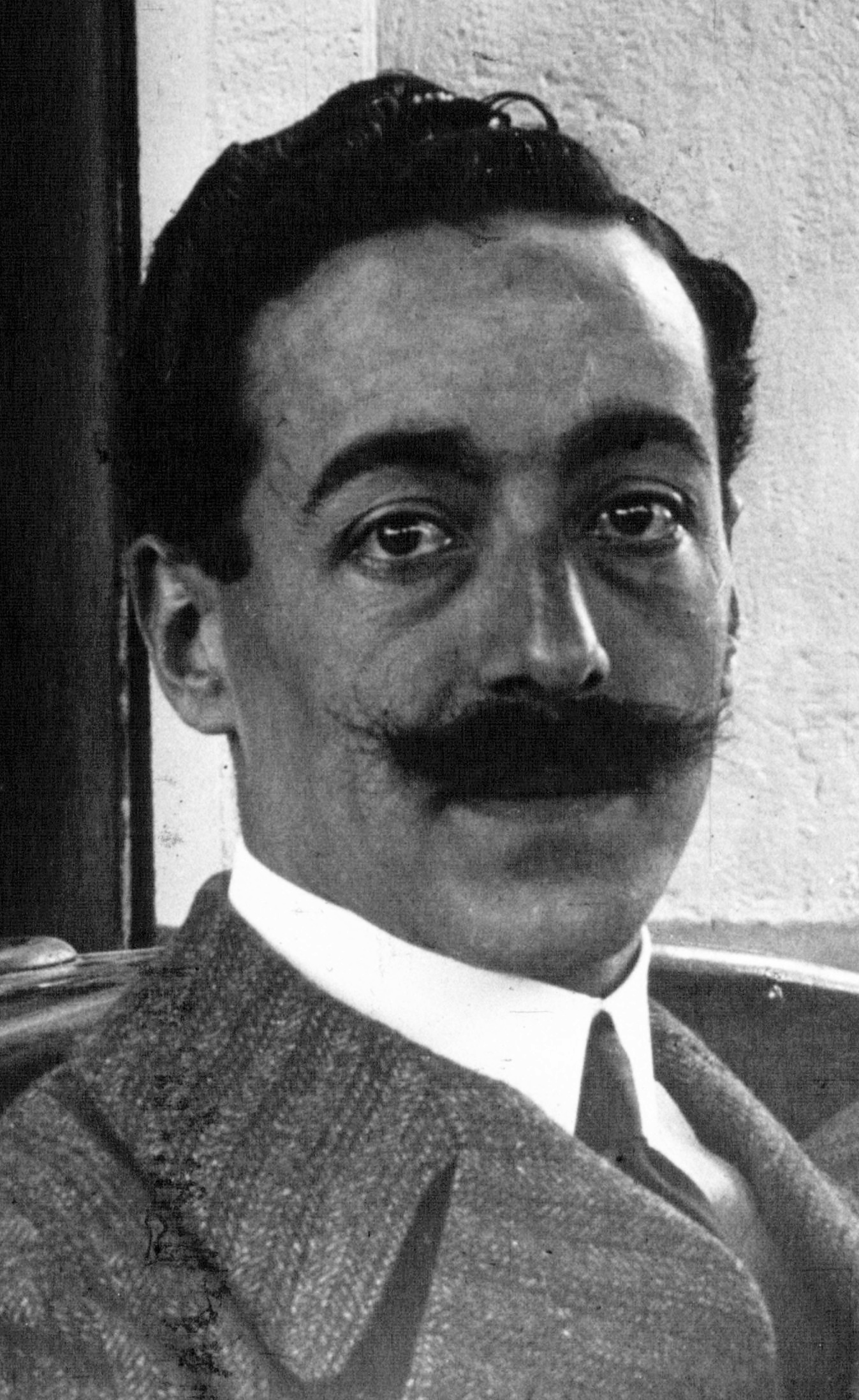
- Cagno at 1914 French Grand Prix
- Born: 2 May 1883; Turin, Italy
- Died: 23 December 1971 (aged 88); Turin, Italy
- Occupations: Driver; Aviator
- Era: Belle Epoque - 1900s
- Known for: Grand Prix racing; Winner of Targa Florio; Vanderbilt Cup Pioneering aviator

Alessandro Umberto Cagno, Umberto Cagno, nicknamed Sandrin (2 May 1883 – 23 December 1971) was an Italian racing driver, Aviation pioneer and powerboat racer.

Apprenticed at 13 to a Turin engineering factory he was later recruited by Giovanni Agnelli as employee number 3 at F.I.A.T., where he progressed to be a test driver, Agnelli's personal driver and works racing team driver. In 1906 he won the inaugural Targa Florio in Sicily after switching to the Itala team.

Cagno co-founded 'AVIS-Voisin' (Atelier Voisin Italie Septentrionale) to build Voisin aircraft under licence. He designed and tested aircraft, founded Italy's first flying school in Pordenone, and was the first person to fly above Venice. After volunteering as a pilot for the Italo-Turkish War (1911–1912) in Libya he invented a bomb aiming device.

== Biography ==
Cagno was born in Turin into a working-class family, his father may have been a coal-merchant. Aged 13 he began working as an engineering apprentice at Storero, a local factory.

== Motoring ==
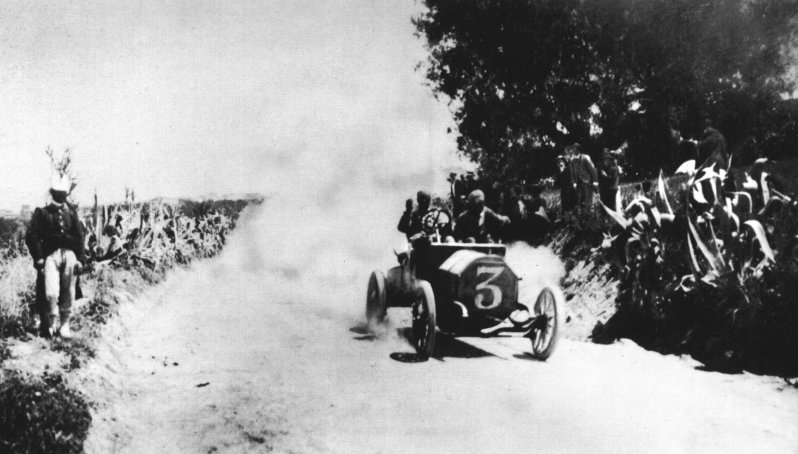
Cagno in Itala No 3, en route to victory in 1906 Targa Florio.

=== Career ===
Cagno was apprenticed at 'Storero' in Turin, a builder of carriages, omnibuses and bicycles, that had started to build Phoenix motorised tricycles under license to the German Daimler company (Daimler-Motoren-Gesellschaft). His skill and passion for mechanics led to him becoming the riding mechanic for Luigi Storero who drove both a De Dion-Bouton tricycle and then his own design of 1.75HP Daimler engined Phoenix tricycle at early cyclecar competitions. They competed at the Piacenza Trotting track (Pista del Trotto) and in the Piacenza-Cremona-Borgo-Piacenza road race.

Giovanni Agnelli, who used a Storero racing tricycle, recruited Cagno as the 3rd worker hired by F.I.A.T. (known as Fiat after 1906) and asked Luigi Storero to create a racing department. The staff included Cagno, Vincenzo Lancia and Felice Nazzaro, and they raced in Italy, France, Germany, Austria, the Netherlands, Belgium, Russia and the USA.

Cagno worked as both a F.I.A.T. test-driver and the personal driver of Giovanni Agnelli. He was the first person to drive a truck from Turin to Moscow, opened the first Fiat branch in Turin and was a champion powerboater.

=== Motor racing ===
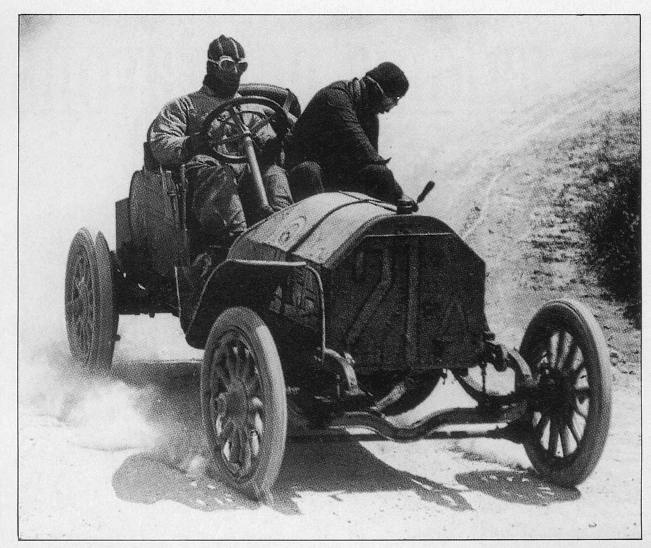
Cagno driving Itala no. 21A at the 1907 Targa Florio.

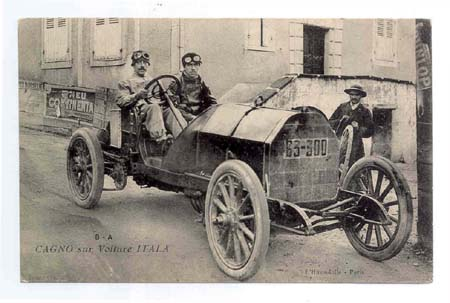
Cagno driving Itala (63-300)

From 1901 to 1905 he raced for F.I.A.T., predominantly at Italian mountain races, his first event was at Saluzzo in 1901 where he finished third and fourth in two handicap events. His first international race was aged 18 in 1902 when he finished second at the Circuit of Ardennes in Belgium.

In addition to driving he still worked as Luigi Storero's riding mechanic, so in 1902 he participated in the Sassi – Superga hillclimb; the Susa–Moncenisio hillclimb; and the Padua Sprint race on the 10 km road between Padua and Bovolenta. In 1903 he was the riding-mechanic for Vincenzo Lancia in the Race of Death from Paris to Madrid, but they retired their F.I.A.T. 24 hp before the race was stopped at Bordeaux.

His first victory came in July 1904 driving the 100 hp F.I.A.T. at the Susa-Mont Cenis (Susa-Moncenisio) hill-climb (or he finished second, 8 seconds behind Felicce Nazarro in another F.I.A.T.).

He finished third at the Gordon Bennett Cup at Puy de Dôme in 1905 and finished fourth at the Mont Ventoux hillclimb, accompanied at these events by Felice Nazzaro this was the first international success of Fiat. Later in 1905 he finished 3rd in the Circuit of Milano, 2nd in the Susa-Montecenisio hillclimb, and first in the Mont Ventoux hillclimb in France.

In 1906 he switched from Fiat to another Turin based manufacturer, Itala (Fab Auto Itala SA.), with whom he won both the inaugural Targa Florio in 1906 and the Coppa della Velocita in 1907. Driving the 120 hp Itala he completed the 3 laps of the Grande Circuit of the Targa Florio, covering the 446 kilometres (277 mi) in 9 hours 32 minutes 22 seconds, an average speed of 46.8 km/h.

Cagno drove the Itala to fifth position at the 1907 Kaiser Preis, completing the two laps in 3 hours 07 minutes 26 seconds. His entry number was 35A, indicating that he was the "A" driver in Team 35.

At the 1907 Coppa della Velocita he completed the 486 kilometres (302 mi) in 4 hours 37 minutes 26.6 seconds, an average speed of 65.2 mph (104.8 km/h). The other members of the Itala team finished eighth and tenth. The car subsequently raced in the US and lapped Brooklands at over 100 mph and is now in the National Motor Museum at Beaulieu, England. In the Vanderbilt Cup on Long Island he finished 7th with the Itala, 1 lap behind Louis Wagner in the winning Darracq.

In 1908 he drove the new 12-cylinder Itala to finish 11th at the French Grand Prix and 3rd in the Coppa Florio at Bologna. The team then entered the 1908 American Grand Prize at Savannah but he retired after a spring broke on lap 12.

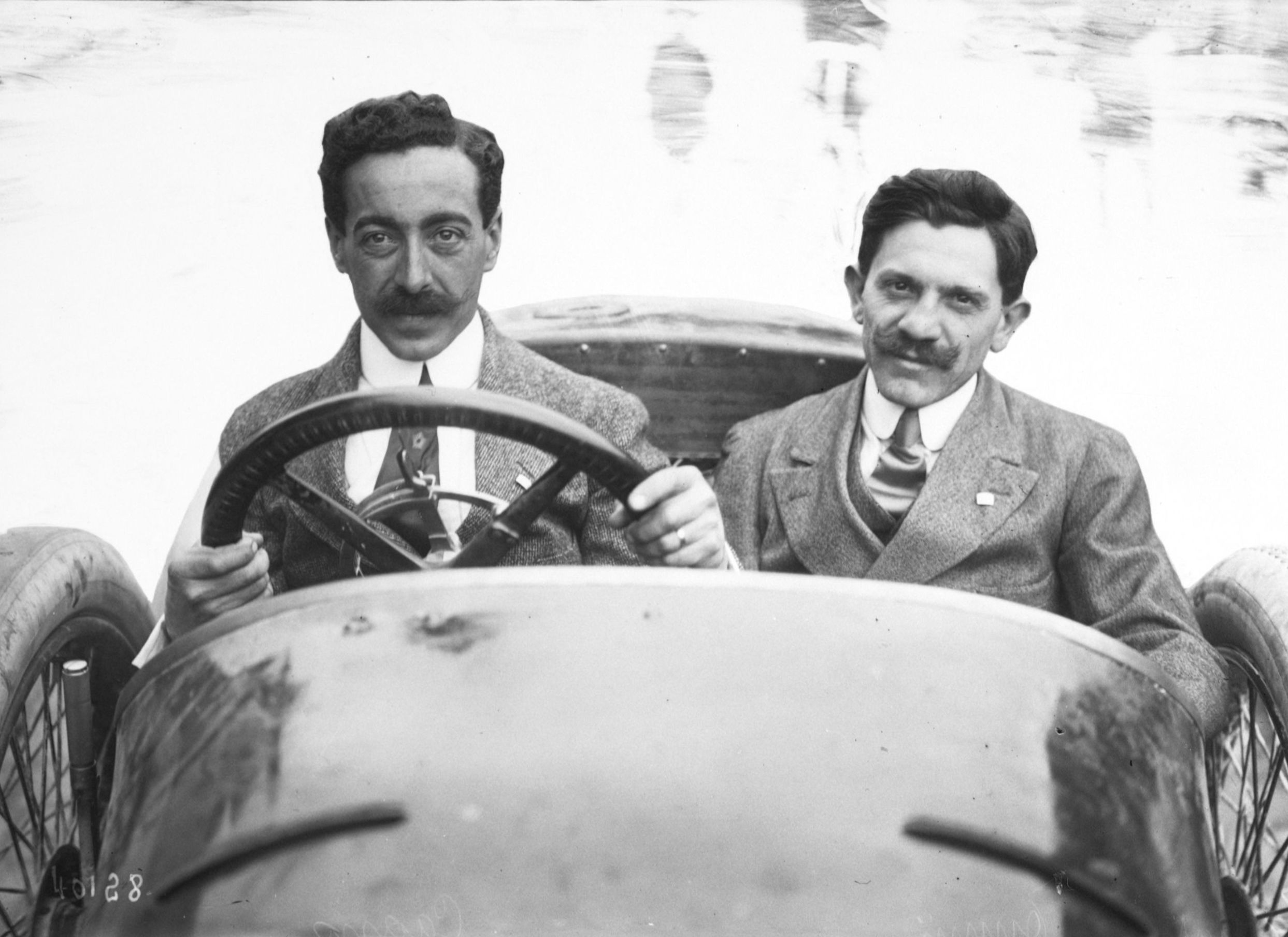
Cagno in the Fiat at the 1914 French Grand Prix

=== Return to Fiat ===
Cagno had lost interest in motor racing by around 1910, concentrating on aviation, but in 1912 he returned to Fiat as both 'Chief Tester of racing cars' and 'General motor vehicle Tester'.

He made an unsuccessful return to racing at the 1914 French Grand Prix where he completed 10 laps before his Fiat retired after damaging a valve.

During the First World War he ran the General Testing Office for the Italian and French armies.

Cagno returned to racing again in the 1920s when he won the 1923 Italian Grand Prix for voiturettes and the Leningrad-Moscow-Tbilisi event in a Fiat.

== Aviation ==
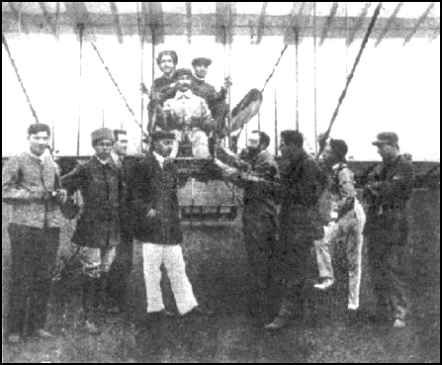
Cagno, Cobianchi and Cei at Pordenone 1910

By 1909 Cagno had lost interest in racing and turned to aviation, gaining his pilot's licence and becoming the instructor at Cameri about 90 km northeast of Turin.

In October 1909 Cagno collaborated with two engineers at Cameri, Clovis Thouvenot and Gino Galli, to establish 'AVIS-Voisin' (Atelier Voisin Italie Septentrionale), to build Voisin aircraft under licence. With these aircraft he competed in the Brescia-Montichiari event.

He both designed and tested aircraft, also founding Italy's first flying school at Pordenone in 1910.

In Venice on 19 February 1911, Cagno made six flights in his 50 hp Farman III from the beach at the Lido di Venezia despite the fog. The plane had been transported in pieces from Pordenone and assembled on the skating rink of the Excelsior Hotel. On 3 March he made the first flight over the city and continued daily until 6 March, the last day of Carnival. A passenger was selected by public lottery, the winner sold his ticket to a lawyer named Casellati.

After volunteering for the Italo-Turkish War in Libya in 1911, he built the first Italian bomber (or "added a grenade launcher"(or a crude aiming device consisting of an angled surface or tube)).

== Motor-boating ==
Cagno competed in motorboat races using F.I.A.T. powered boats. He won the Monaco meeting in 1906.

== Death and commemoration ==
Cagno retired from motor-racing in 1923, and lived in his family home in Turin until his death in 1971.

== Results ==
Year	Event	Date	Location	Distance	Result	# No.	Manufacturer	Time	Speed (km/h)	Notes
1901	Handicap event	8 September	Saluzzo	10 km	3		F.I.A.T. 8 hp			Racing debut
1901	Handicap event	8 September	Saluzzo	5 km	4		F.I.A.T. 8 hp			Racing debut
1903	Circuit of Ardennes	22 June	Bastogne Belgium	512 km (85.34 km x 6 laps)	10	47	F.I.A.T. 24 hp	7:06:56		3rd in light car class
1904	Susa-Montecenisio Hillclimb	10 July	Susa	22.089 km	1 or 3		F.I.A.T. 75 hp	23 mins 33.4s		
1904	I Coppa Florio	4 September	Brescia	372.166 km (186.083 km x 2 laps)	dnf	12	F.I.A.T.			
1904	La Consuma Hillclimb	11 September	Consuma	15 km	6		F.I.A.T. 60 hp Touring	17:15.6s		
1905	Gordon Bennett Cup; Circuit de l'Auvergne		Puy de Dôme		3		F.I.A.T. 100 hp	7:22.83		
1905	Circuit of Milano		Milan		3		F.I.A.T. 100 hp			
1905	Susa-Montecenisio Hillclimb	16 July	Susa	23 km	2		F.I.A.T. 100 hp	19 mins 26.3s		
1905	Mont Ventoux Hillclimb	17 September	Avignon	21.6 km	1 (or 4)		F.I.A.T. 100 hp	19:30s	65.568 km/h	
1905	II Coppa Florio	4 September	Brescia	500.975 km	dnf	15	F.I.A.T. 100 hp			2 laps/radiator
1906	Targa Florio	6 May	Sicily	446.469 km	1	3	Itala 35/40 hp	9:32:22	46.80 km/h	
1906	Coppa d'Oro del Turismo	14–24 May	Milan		3		Itala 24 hp			
1906	IX Grand Prix de l'Automobile Club de France	26–27 June	Le Mans	1,238.03 km	dnf	8A	Itala 120 hp			2 laps/radiator
1906	III W.K. Vanderbilt Cup	6 October	Long Island	769.91 km	7		Itala 120 hp			9 laps/running
1907	Targa Florio	22 April	Sicily	3 laps x 92.473 miles 277.42 mile	5	21A	Itala 35/40 hp	8:39:06		
1907	I Kaiser Preis	13–14 June	Taunus	Heat 1 - 2 laps (146.30 miles)	5	35A	Itala 35/40 hp	3:07:26		
1907	I Kaiser Preis	13–14 June	Taunus	Final 4 laps (292.60 miles)	10		Itala 35/40 hp	5:59:14.0		
1907	III Coppa Florio	1 September	Brescia	301.80 km (37.725 km x 8 laps)	dnf	6A	Itala 35/40 hp (Kaiser Preis cars)			2 laps
1907	I Coppa Velocita di Brescia	2 September	Brescia	301.80 km (37.725 km x 8 laps)	1	3A	Itala (Grand Prix cars)	4:37:36.6		Fastest Lap: Cagno; 31m31.0 (71.80 mph); Gold cup valued at $5,000
1908	XI Grand Prix de l'A.C.F. French Grand Prix	7 July	Dieppe	477.48 miles (47.74 miles x 10 laps)	11	12	Itala 120 hp	8:07:56.0		Debut of new 12-cylinder Itala 120Hp
1908	IV Coppa Florio	6 September	Bologna	328.226 miles (32.825 miles x 10 laps)	3	6	Itala	4:56:12		
1908	I Grand Prize Race of the Automobile Club of America	26 November	Savannah, Georgia	402.080 miles (25.130 miles x 16 laps)	dnf	12	Itala			11 laps/spring
1914	1914 French Grand Prix	4 July	Lyon	752.58 km (467.600 mi); 37.629 km x 20 laps	dnf	13	Fiat			10 laps, Valve damage
1923	III Gran Premio delle Vetturette	29 June	Brescia	521.76 km (17.39 km x 30 laps)	1		Fiat 803	4:02:16.8	129.28 km/h	Fastest Lap: 7:28.2 (139.75 km/h)
1923	Leningrad Moscow Tbilisi Moscow		Russia		1		Fiat			
