= Franz von Blon =

German composer

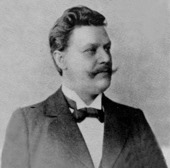
Franz von Blon

Franz von Blon (July 16, 1861 – October 21, 1945) was a German composer and bandmaster best known for his concert marches, operettas, and the serenade Sizilietta. He was born in Berlin on July 16, 1861 and attended Stern's Conservatory of Music. He began composing during his military service from 1880 to 1883. He founded the Berlin Philharmonic Wind Orchestra, with which he toured Europe and the United States, conducting concerts at the 1904 World's Fair. He died near Berlin in 1945.
