= Motorsport before 1906 =

List of pre-1906 motorsport races

This is a list of motorsport events held before 1906, which is regarded as the first Grand Prix racing season.

== 1894 ==
Date	Name
22 July	(France) 'Paris–Rouen' horseless carriage contest

== 1895 ==
Date	Name	Winning driver	Winning constructor
18 May	(Italy) Torino–Asti–Torino race	(Italy) Simone Federmann	Daimler
11–13 June	(France) Paris–Bordeaux–Paris race	(France) Paul Koechlin	Peugeot
28 November	(United States) Chicago Times-Herald race	(United States) J. Frank Duryea	Duryea

== 1896 ==
Date	Name	Winning driver	Winning constructor
24–25 May	(France) Bordeaux–Agen–Bordeaux race	(France) Bousquet	Peugeot
30 May	(United States) Cosmopolitan Magazine New York City–Irvington race	(United States) J. Frank Duryea	Duryea
11 July	(Belgium) Meeting of Spa	(France) Albert Laumaillé	Peugeot
24 September – 3 October	(France) Paris–Marseille–Paris race	(France) Émile Mayade	Panhard
14 November	(United Kingdom) London–Brighton 'emancipation' run		

== 1897 ==
Date	Name	Winning driver	Winning constructor
29–31 January	(France) Marseilles–Nice–La Turbie race	(France) Gaston de Chasseloup-Laubat	De Dion
24 July	(France) Paris–Dieppe race	(France) Jules-Albert de Dion	De Dion
14 August	(France) Paris–Trouville race	(France) Gilles Hourgières	Panhard
22–23 August	(France) Lyon–Uriage–Lyon race	(France) Étienne Giraud	Panhard
12 September	(Italy) Arona–Stresa–Arona race	(Italy) Giuseppe Cobianchi	Benz

== 1898 ==
Date	Name	Winning driver	Winning constructor
6–7 March	(France) Marseille–Nice-La Turbie race	(France) Fernand Charron	Panhard
1 May	(France) Course de Périgueux	(France) Gustave Leys	Panhard
11–12 May	(France) Critérium des Entraneurs	(France) René de Knyff	Panhard
24 May	(Germany) Berlin–Potsdam–Berlin race	Friedrich Greiner	Daimler
29 May	(France) Bordeaux–Agen race	(France) Petit	Peugeot
25–26 June	(Belgium) Bruxelles–Spa race	(Belgium) Pierre de Crawhez	Panhard
7–13 July	(France) (Netherlands) (Belgium) Paris–Amsterdam–Paris race	(France) Fernand Charron	Panhard
17 July	(Italy) Torino–Asti–Alessandria–Torino race	(Italy) Guido Ehrenfreund	Miari & Giusti
31 July – 1 August	(France) Lille–Calais–Lille race	(France) Émile Kraeutler	Peugeot
20–21 August	(France) Bordeaux–Biarritz race	(France) René Loysel	Bollée
21 August	(France) Lyon–Lagnieu race	(France) Eldin	Peugeot
27–29 August	(Austria-Hungary) Trafoi–Mendelpass	(Austria-Hungary) Wilhelm Bauer	Daimler
11 October	(Russia) Kubok Obschestva Velosipednoy Ezdy	(Russia) Pavel Belyaev	Clement
20 October	(France) St. Germain–Vernon–St. Germain race	(France) Alfred Velghe	Mors

== 1899 ==
Date	Name	Winning driver	Winning constructor
26 January	(France) Coupe de Périgord	(France) Léonce Girardot	Panhard
14 March	(Italy) Verona–Brescia–Mantua–Verona race	(France) Louis Bouvier	Bollée
21 March	(France) Nice–Castellane–Nice race	(France) Albert Lemaître	Peugeot
6 April	(France) Pau–Bayonne–Pau race	(France) Albert Lemaître	Peugeot
28 April	(Italy) Limone–Cuneo–Torino race	(France) De Gras	Peugeot
30 April	(Italy) Torino–Pinerolo–Avigliani–Torino race	(France) De Gras	Peugeot
14 May	(Belgium) Anvers race	(Belgium) Pierre de Crawhez	Daimler
22 May	(France) Bordeaux–Périgueux–Bordeaux race	(France) Barbereau	Bollée
22 May	(Italy) Bologna–Poggio Renatico–Malalbergo–Bologna race	(Italy) Emilio Laporte	Orio & Marchand
24 May	(France) Paris–Bordeaux race	(France) Fernand Charron	Panhard
6 June	(France) Critérium des Voiturettes	(France) Wilfrid	Bollée
11 June	(France) Aubagne–Aix race	(France) Gras	Peugeot
19 June	(Italy) Padova–Vicenza–Thiene–Bassano–Treviso–Padova race	(Italy) Rossati	Mors
1 July	(Belgium) Bruxelles–Namur–Spa race	(Belgium) Gaëtan De Knyff	Panhard
2 July	(Germany) Frankfurt–Cologne race	(Germany) Fritz Held	Benz
2 July	(France) Salon–Arles–St. Gabriel–Salon race	(France) de Farconnet	Turcat-Méry
4 July	(Belgium) Spa–Bastogne–Spa race	(France) René de Knyff	Panhard
14 July	(Germany) Mainz–Bingen–Coblenz–Mainz race	(Germany) Eugène de Dietrich	De Dietrich
16–24 July	Tour de France race	(France) René de Knyff	Panhard
23 July	(Germany) Innsbruck–Munich race	(Germany) Eugène de Dietrich	De Dietrich
30 July	(France) Paris–Saint Malo race	(France) Antony	Mors
15 August	(Italy) Piacenza–Cremona–Borgo–Piacenza race	(Italy) Emilio Laporte	Orio & Marchand
27 August	(France) Paris–Trouville race	(France) Antony	Mors
1 September	(France) (Belgium) Paris–Oostende race	(France) Léonce Girardot (France) Alfred Velghe	Panhard; Mors
11 September	(Italy) Brescia–Cremona–Mantova–Verona–Brescia race	(Italy) Giuseppe Alberti	Mors
11 September	(Italy) Treviso–Oderzo–Codogné–Conegliano–Treviso race	(Italy) Andrea Antonini	Benz
17 September	(France) Paris–Boulogne race	(France) Léonce Girardot	Panhard
24 September	(Spain) Ciutadella park of Barcelona	(Spain) Daniel Fradera	Benz
20 September	(Germany) Berlin–Leipzig race	(Germany) Fritz Held & Richard Benz	Benz
1 October	(France) Bordeaux–Biarritz race	(France) Alfred Velghe	Mors
8 October	(France) Paris–Rambouillet–Paris race	(France) Louis Renault	Renault

== 1900 ==
Date	Name	Winning driver	Winning constructor
18 February	(France) Course du Catalogue	(France) Léonce Girardot	Panhard
25 February	(France) Circuit du Sud-Ouest	(France) René de Knyff	Panhard
26 March	(France) Nice–Marseille–Nice race	(France) René de Knyff	Panhard
18 April	(United States) Long Island Road Race	(United States) Andrew L. Riker	Riker Electric
23 April	(Italy) Torino–Pinerolo–Saluzzo–Cuneo–Torino race	(France) Cuchelet	Peugeot
28 April	(Italy) Torino–Asti race	(Italy) Felice Nazzaro	Fiat
13 May	(Germany) Mannheim–Pforzheim–Mannheim race	(Germany) Fritz Held	Benz
28 May	(Italy) Bologna–Corticella–Poggio Renatico–Malalbergo–Bologna race	(Italy) Lorenzo Ginori	Bolide
1–2 June	(Austria-Hungary) Salzburg–Linz–Vienna race	(Austria-Hungary) Richard von Stern	Daimler
3–4 June	(France) Bordeaux–Périgueux–Bordeaux race	(France) Alfred Velghe	Mors
14 June	(France) Coupe Gordon Bennett	(France) Fernand Charron	Panhard
1 July	(Italy) Padua–Vicenza–Bassano–Treviso–Padua race	(Italy) Vincenzo Lancia	Fiat
1 July	(France) Critérium de Provence	(Belgium) Camille Jenatzy	Bolide
25, 27–28 July	(France) Paris–Toulouse–Paris race	(France) Alfred Velghe	Mors
29 July	(Germany) Frankfurt Circuit Race	(Germany) Richard Benz	Benz
30 August – 2 September	(Germany) Berlin–Aachen race	(France) Émile Kraeutler	Benz
10 September	(Italy) Coppa Brescia	(Italy) Alberto Franchetti	Panhard

== 1901 ==
Date	Name	Winning driver	Winning constructor
17 February	(France) Grand Prix du Sud-Ouest	(France) Maurice Farman	Panhard
25 March	(France) Nice–Salon–Nice race	(Germany) Wilhelm Werner	Mercedes
12 May	(Germany) Mannheim–Pforzheim–Mannheim race	(Germany) Willy Tischbein	De Dietrich
29 May	(France) Paris–Bordeaux race	(France) Henri Fournier	Mors
29 May	(France) Coupe Gordon Bennett	(France) Léonce Girardot	Panhard
27–29 June	(France) (Germany) Paris–Berlin race	(France) Henri Fournier	Mors
30 June	(Italy) Coppa Italia	(Italy) Guido Adami	Panhard
24 August	(Italy) Piombino–Grosseto race	(Italy) Felice Nazzaro	Fiat
1 September	(Belgium) Oostende Meeting	(Belgium) Pierre de Caters	Mors

== 1902 ==
Date	Name	Winning driver	Winning constructor
15–16 May	(France) Circuit du Nord	(France) Maurice Farman	Panhard
26–28 June	(France) Coupe Gordon Bennett	(United Kingdom) Selwyn Edge	Napier
26–28 June	(France) (Germany) (Austria-Hungary) Paris–Vienna race	(France) Marcel Renault	Renault
31 July	(Belgium) Circuit des Ardennes	(United Kingdom) Charles Jarrott	Panhard
31 August	(Germany) Frankfurt Circuit Race	(Germany) Wilhelm Werner	Mercedes
14 September	(France) Critérium de Provence	(France) Paul Chauchard	Panhard

== 1903 ==
Date	Name	Winning driver	Winning constructor
24 May	(France) (Spain) Paris–Madrid race	(France) Fernand Gabriel	Mors
22 June	(Belgium) Circuit des Ardennes	(Belgium) Pierre de Crawhez	Panhard
2 July	(United Kingdom) Coupe Gordon Bennett	(Belgium) Camille Jenatzy	Mercedes
30 August	(Germany) Frankfurt Circuit Race	(Germany) Willy Pöge	Mercedes
18 October	(Germany) Westend race	(Germany) Gustav Müller	Mercedes

== 1904 ==
Date	Name	Winning driver	Winning constructor
20 May	(France) Éliminatoires Françaises de la Coupe Internationale	(France) Léon Théry	Richard-Brasier
17 June	(Germany) Coupe Gordon Bennett	(France) Léon Théry	Richard-Brasier
19 June	(Germany) Frankfurt Circuit Race	(Germany) Willy Pöge	Mercedes
25 July	(Belgium) Circuit des Ardennes	(United States) George Heath	Panhard
5 September	(Italy) Coppa Brescia	(Italy) Vincenzo Lancia	Fiat
8 October	(United States) Vanderbilt Cup	(United States) George Heath	Panhard
23 October	(Germany) Bahrenfeld race	(France) Victor Hémery	Opel-Darracq

== 1905 ==
Date	Name	Winning driver	Winning constructor
15 February	(Cuba) Cuban Race	(Cuba) Ernesto Carricaburu	Mercedes
30 May	(United Kingdom) English Elimination Trials	(United Kingdom) Clifford Earp	Napier
16 June	(France) Éliminatoires Françaises de la Coupe Internationale	(France) Léon Théry	Richard-Brasier
5 July	(France) Coupe Gordon Bennett	(France) Léon Théry	Richard-Brasier
7 August	(Belgium) Circuit des Ardennes	(France) Victor Hémery	Darracq
27 August	(Germany) Frankfurt Circuit Race	(Germany) Friedrich Opel	Opel
3 September	(Germany) Bahrenfeld race	(France) Henri Jeannin	Argus
9 September	(Italy) Coppa Florio	(Italy) Giovanni Battista Raggio	Itala
23 September	(United States) Vanderbilt Elimination Race	(United States) Bert Dingley	Pope-Toledo
14 October	(United States) Vanderbilt Cup	(France) Victor Hémery	Darracq
