= 1902 Gordon Bennett Cup =

- Pre-1906 Grand Prix seasons
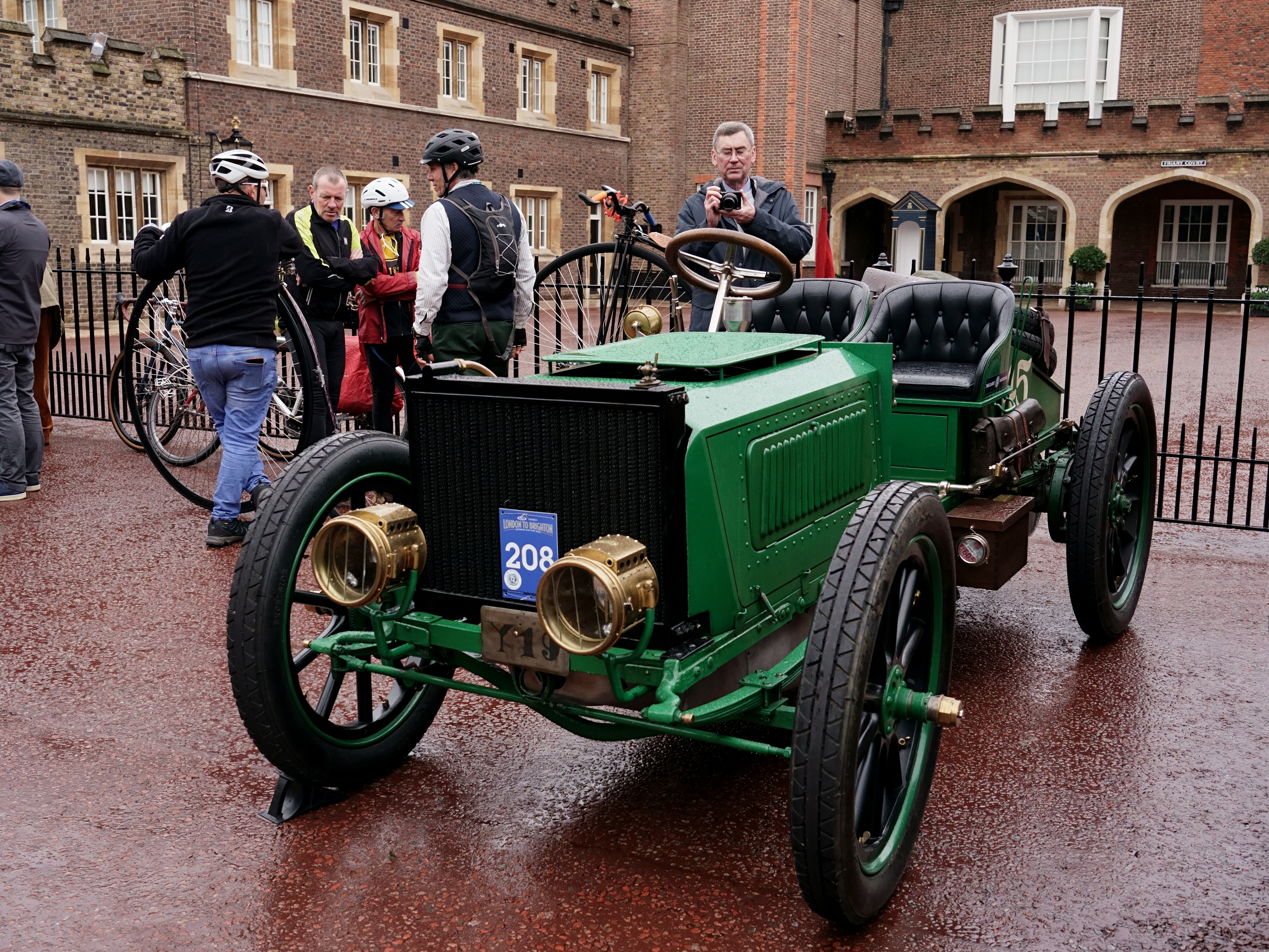
- The winner, this Napier D50

Race details
- Date: 26–28 June 1902
- Official name: III Coupe Internationale
- Location: Paris, France to Innsbruck, Austria
- Course: Public roads
- Course length: 565 km (351 miles)

Podium
First	(United Kingdom) Selwyn Edge (GBR)	Napier

The 1902 Gordon Bennett Cup, formally titled the III Coupe Internationale, was a motor race held on 26–28 June 1902, on public roads between Paris, France, and Innsbruck, Austria. The race was held over a 565 km section of the route of the Paris–Vienna race, held concurrently. France were to attempt to defend the Gordon Bennett Cup against Britain, and each country was represented by three entries, with the car that finished the race in the shortest time winning the race on behalf of his country.

The first day of the race saw three of the six competitors retire from the race; two French drivers and one Briton. The only remaining French driver, Rene de Knyff led the race by over an hour from British driver Selwyn Edge, with the other British driver Montague Grahame-White over five hours behind. The second day took the competitors through Switzerland, where motor racing was banned, and so this was deemed a neutralised section with cars required to adhere to a speed limit of 15 mph. The third and final day of the race for the Gordon Bennett Cup began at Bregenz and ran to Innsbruck in Austria. The route took the competitors over the Arlberg Pass, and this section of the route caused de Knyff's differential to break and Grahame-White's crankshaft to fail, forcing them both to retire and leaving Edge as the only competitor remaining in the race. Edge reached Innsbruck to claim victory for Britain, in a time of just over 11 hours.

== Background ==
The Gordon Bennett races had been established by American millionaire James Gordon Bennett, Jr. in 1900, with the intention of encouraging automobile industries through sport. Both the inaugural event and the previous event in 1901 had been won by representatives of the Automobile Club de France (ACF). Under the rules of the competition, the following race was required to be held in the country that currently held the cup, meaning that for the third year in succession, France would host the Gordon Bennett cup.

However, following another race held later in 1901, the Paris-Berlin city-to-city race, in which a young boy had been killed after being struck by a competitor when he stepped into the road, the French government passed a law to ban motor racing. Some negotiations were required between representatives of the French automobile industry and the French government before the law was repealed and racing could proceed. An agreement was also required with the authorities in Switzerland, where racing was also banned. It was agreed that the section of the race through Switzerland would be neutralised, and cars would be given a minimum time to complete the journey which would be achievable without exceeding any speed limits.

The various automobile clubs eligible to challenge for the Gordon Bennett Cup were required to register their intention to participate with the ACF by January 1, 1902. Only the Automobile Club of Britain and Ireland registered to compete for the cup, meaning that as in 1901, France would defend the Cup against the British.

== Route ==
The race was held concurrently with the Paris-Vienna city-to-city race, a race scheduled to take place over 990 km. The Gordon-Bennett Cup rules required a distance of between 550 and 650 km, and the organisers decided to run the Cup race over 565 km of the Paris-Vienna route, starting from Paris and finishing at Innsbruck in Austria. The route to be taken also featured a 312 km neutralised section to take the competitors through Switzerland, where racing was banned, which was not counted as part of the overall race distance.

The course was split into three sections, each to be run on consecutive days. The first section began in Champigny-sur-Marne, a commune in the south-eastern suburbs of Paris, before proceeding south-easterly through the towns of Nangis, Troyes, Langres, and coming to an end at Belfort, a distance of 375 km. The 312 km neutralised stage through Switzerland comprised the second section, beginning at Belfort before crossing over the Swiss border and traveling east through Basel and Zurich. The route then crossed the border with Austria and continued 12 miles to the rest town of Bregenz. The third section was 190 km long, beginning at Bregenz and initially running south along the border. It then proceeded easterly through the Arlberg mountain range, which required the competitors to negotiate the climb and descent of the Arlberg pass, a section of road that at its peak was nearly 5,000 ft above sea level. From here the route continued east through the town of Telfs before reaching the finish for the Gordon-Bennett section of the race at Innsbruck.

== Entries and cars ==
Each country was limited to three entries under the rules. Both France and Britain elected to enter a full complement of cars for the race, meaning there would be six entries for the Gordon Bennett Cup, amongst the 219 cars entered for the Paris-Vienna race. France elected to enter Léonce Girardot, the winner of the 1901 Gordon Bennett Cup, who ran a car bearing his name, a Charron-Girardot-Voigt. Fournier ran a Mors and de Knyff a Panhard. The French had elected to make their selections on merit, rather than running any qualifying event. The three British entries were Selwyn Francis Edge driving a Napier and two Wolseley cars driven by Montague Grahame-White and Arthur Callan. Each of the drivers was accompanied by a riding mechanic.

New regulations came into force for the race, with a maximum weight limit of 1,000 kilograms (2,205 lb) imposed on each car, plus an extra 7 kilograms (15 lb) if a magneto was fitted to the car. The three French manufacturers opted to modify an earlier version of their car in order to meet the weight limit. Napier constructed an entirely new car, designed from the outset to meet the weight limit. This different approach contributed to the Napier weighing 933 kilograms (2,057 lb), with full tanks of fuel compared to the French cars which were on the limit. As part of the negotiations between the French government and ACF with regard to lifting the ban on racing, it was agreed to promote using alcohol, of which there was an oversupply at the time, as a fuel during the Paris-Vienna race. de Knyff's Panhard was the only one of the Gordon-Bennett entries that chose to run on alcohol.

== Race ==
Cars were dispatched at two-minute intervals, beginning at 3:30am, from the start line in Champigny-sur-Marne on the outskirts of Paris. The Gordon Bennett entrants were scheduled to start ahead of the other Paris-Vienna entries. First to start was last year’s winner Giradot on his CGV. He was followed by Fournier on his Mors. Edge had problems with his Napier's gearbox en route to the race, and was required to make a further repair to it just before the race, to correct a mistake made during a previous repair. Despite this, he was ready in time to take the start next. Next away was de Knyff of Panhard, who would be the last of the Gordon Bennett racers to depart before the rest of the Paris-Vienna competitors. The crankshaft on Grahame-White's Wolseley broke on the approach to the start line, and he spent over five hours repairing it before he was able to take the start. Problems also prevented the other Wolseley driven by Callan to start at the appointed time.

Giradot was forced to stop his CGV due to a cracked fuel tank at the town of Troyes, 140 km into the race, and was unable to continue. In contrast, Fournier had made good progress to Troyes, taking 80 minutes to reach the town from the start. However, 10 km before reaching Langres, the clutch on his Mors failed, and he also retired from the race, leaving just one French competitor in the event. Nevertheless, at the end of the first section, de Knyff led not only the remaining Gordon Bennett cars, but the overall Paris-Vienna field, while his nearest competitor in the Gordon Bennett race was Edge, over an hour-and-three-quarters behind. Grahame-White did not arrive at Belfort until 3:30 on the morning of June 27. Callan had eventually started the race but he did not reach Belfort, having retired somewhere along the route.

The second section of the race took the competitors from Belfort near the Swiss border with France to Bregenz in Austria, a distance of 312 km. Owing to the ban on motor racing in Switzerland, racing was neutralized, and in order to obtain permission to pass through the country, organizers set competitors a minimum time that had to be taken to complete this section, to try to ensure cars kept to the 15 mph speed limit. In addition, the Swiss police used a system of telephones to communicate with each other along the route, in order to enforce the speed limit. Owing to this, the distance was not counted towards the race total. The roads in Switzerland were not as smooth as in France, and this put considerable strain on the cars despite them not travelling at racing speeds. The poor road surface had led to a crack beginning to develop on the casing of the differential on de Knyff's Panhard. However, all three of the remaining Gordon Bennett cars made it to the end of the section.

Racing resumed the next morning, with the Gordon-Bennett Cup route scheduled to end at a rest stop at Innsbruck, before the Paris-Vienna resumed on its way to Salzburg. de Knyff continued to lead Edge until 40 km before Innsbruck, when his damaged differential finally failed forcing him to retire whilst travelling over the Arlberg pass. Edge now only needed to reach the finish in order to secure the cup for the Automobile Club of Great Britain. His Napier has not escaped unharmed during its passage through Arlberg, as on inspecting his car at the bottom of the pass Edge found that the back of the car had suffered some damage and their tools and spare parts had fallen out en route. Edge reached Innsbruck in a total time of 11 hours, two minutes, and 52.6 seconds, and meant that the cup would leave France for the first time.

== Post-race and legacy ==
Edge went on to complete the remainder of the Paris-Vienna race, finishing in 11th place overall. Marcel Renault won this race overall, in a time of 15:47:43. Following the race, a protest was made to the Gordon Bennett organising committee against Edge, claiming that he had received assistance. Accounts on where the assistance occurred, and in what form differ, but at de Knyff's insistence, the protest was dropped and the result stood.

Victory for a car manufactured outside France for the first time in a Gordon Bennett race was seen as a source of embarrassment for the French, and they set about making a serious effort to regain the trophy. This contributed to the boosting of the event's popularity, with all future Gordon Bennett races being events in their own right, rather than a subsidiary of a larger city-to-city race. The success of an entry from outside France also saw Napier sales increase, with Edge securing contracts in America and France, and annual output increasing from 100 cars to 250 requiring a move from Lambeth to Acton.

The race brought about a change in race car design philosophy. The success of the comparatively underpowered, but lighter Napier led designers to realise that obtaining as much power as possible out of a smaller engine would result in a more reliable and competitive car than simply increasing the capacity of the engine, and reducing chassis weight to remain under the regulation weight.

== Classification ==
Pos	Driver	Constructor	Time/Retired
1	(United Kingdom) Selwyn Edge (GBR)	Napier	11:02:52.6
Ret	(France) René de Knyff (FRA)	Panhard	Differential
Ret	(United Kingdom) Montague Grahame-White (GBR)	Wolseley	Crankshaft
Ret	(France) Henri Fournier (FRA)	Mors	Clutch
Ret	(France) Léonce Girardot (FRA)	C.G.V.	Fuel tank
Ret	(United Kingdom) Arthur Callan (GBR)	Wolseley	Retired
