= 1905 Gordon Bennett Cup =

- Pre-1906 Grand Prix seasons

Race details
- Date: 5 July 1905
- Official name: VI Coupe Internationale
- Location: Auvergne, France
- Course length: 137.354 km (85.35 miles)
- Distance: 4 laps, 549.415 km (341.4 miles)

Podium
First	(France) Léon Théry	Brasier
Second	(Italy) Felice Nazzaro	FIAT
Third	(Italy) Alessandro Cagno	FIAT

The 1905 Gordon Bennett Cup, formally titled the VI Coupe Internationale, was a motor race held on 5 July 1905 on the Auvergne Circuit in France. The race consisted of four laps of the mountainous 137.35-km (85.35-mile) circuit, to make the total distance 549.4 km (341.4 miles). A French entry driven by Léon Théry had won the previous year's edition of the race, which meant that the rights to host the race fell to the Automobile Club de France (ACF). France were to attempt to defend the Gordon Bennett Cup against Germany, Great Britain, Austria, Italy and the United States, and each country was represented by three entries, with the car that finished the race in the shortest time winning the race on behalf of his country. This meant the largest field of any Gordon Bennett race with 18 entries competing on behalf of six countries.

Théry, driving a 96 hp Richard-Brasier, won in a time of seven hours, 2 minutes and 42 seconds, an average speed of 77.98 km/h (48.45 mph), to become the only driver to win two Gordon Bennett Cup races. His victory was the fourth Gordon Bennett win by an entry representing France. Felice Nazzaro and Alessandro Cagno, both driving FIATs and representing Italy, finished second and third respectively, Nazzaro finishing nearly 17 minutes behind Théry with Cagno a further two minutes back. The third Italian representative, Vincenzo Lancia, was fastest over the first two laps in his FIAT, but broke down with radiator problems during his third lap.

The race took place on the doorstep of the Clermont-Ferrand headquarters of Michelin, starting and ending at race-specific facilities near Laschamps (Saint-Genès-Champanelle), and the Richard-Brasiers and FIATs were fitted with Michelin tyres. Gustave Caillois finished fourth in the second Richard-Brasier, nearly six minutes behind Cagno but over 36 minutes ahead of Christian Lautenschlager, the best-placed German representative driving a Mercedes.

Charles Rolls, driving a Wolseley, was the best-placed British representative, finishing eighth, while only one representative each from Austria and the United States finished, Edgar Braun coming home tenth in a Mercedes, and Herbert Lytle twelfth and last in a Pope-Toledo, nearly two and a half hours behind Théry.

Chronographs for timing for the event were again supplied by the Anglo-Swiss firm of Stauffer, Son & Co.

After the race, the ACF announced its intention of not staging the Gordon Bennett Cup the following year, instead organising a race in which no limit could be placed on the number of cars a country could enter: the Grand Prix.

== Classification ==
Pos	Driver	Number	starting for	Constructor	Time/Retired	Image
1	(France) Léon Théry (FRA)	1	France	Richard-Brasier	7:02:43	
2	(Italy) Felice Nazzaro (ITA)	16	Italy	FIAT	7:19:09	
3	(Italy) Alessandro Cagno (ITA)	10	Italy	FIAT	7:21:23	
4	(France) Gustave Caillois (FRA)	7	France	Richard-Brasier	7:27:06	
5	(Germany) Wilhelm Werner (GER)	15	Germany	Mercedes	8:03:30	
6	(Belgium) Arthur Duray (BEL)	13	France	De Dietrich	8:05:00	
7	(Belgium) Pierre de Caters (BEL)	9	Germany	Mercedes	8:07:12	
8	(United Kingdom) Charles Rolls (GBR)	8	Great Britain	Wolseley	8:26:42	
9	(United Kingdom) Clifford Earp (GBR)	2	Great Britain	Napier	8:27:30	
10	(Austria) Edgar Braun (AUT)	5	Austria	Mercedes	8:33:06	
11	(United Kingdom) Cecil Bianchi (GBR)	14	Great Britain	Wolseley	8:38:32	
12	(United States) Herbert Lytle (USA)	6	USA	Pope-Toledo	9:30:32	
DNF	(Italy) Vincenzo Lancia (ITA)	4	Italy	FIAT	*	
DNF	(Belgium) Camille Jenatzy (BEL)	3	Germany	Mercedes	*	
DNF	(Austria) Burton (AUT)	17	Austria	Mercedes	*	
DNF	(United States) Joe Tracy (USA)	18	USA	Locomobile	*	
DNF	(Austria) Otto Hieronimus (AUT)	11	Austria	Mercedes	*	
DNF	(United States) Bert Dingley (USA)	12	USA	Pope-Toledo	*	
