= 1901 Gordon Bennett Cup =

The 1901 Gordon Bennett Cup, formally titled the II Coupe Internationale, was a motor race held on 29 May 1901, on public roads in France between Paris and Bordeaux, concurrently with an open-entry race over the same course. Initially, France were to defend the Cup against Great Britain, however prior to the start, the sole British entry was forced to fit tyres of foreign manufacture making it ineligible for the Cup. The race was therefore competed by three French entries, the maximum permitted from one country under the rules, guaranteeing that they would retain the Cup. Léonce Girardot driving a Panhard won the race and was the only competitor to finish, with Fernand Charron driving a Panhard and Levegh driving a Mors retiring.

== Background ==
The Gordon Bennett races had been established by American millionaire James Gordon Bennett, Jr. in 1900, with the intention of encouraging automobile industries through sport. The inaugural event had been won by a representative of the Automobile Club de France (ACF). Under the rules of the competition, the following race was required to be held in the country that currently held the cup.

== Route ==
The race organisers, the ACF, decided that the race would take place concurrently with an open-entry event held on public roads taking the competitors from Paris-Bordeaux. The route for the event covered 555km, with 527km (328 miles) competitive miles and the remainder covering neutralised towns.

== Entries and cars ==
Each country was limited to three entries under the race's rules. The rules also stipulated that every part of the car must be manufactured in the country of the entrant. Initially, France, Germany and Britain showed interest in entering the race. The Automobilclub von Deutschland (AvD) planned to host an elimination trial on 12 May between three Mercedes cars, a Benz and a Canello-Durkopp to determine their three entries. Following Mercedes victory in the Nice-Salon-Nice race held in March however, they were automatically awarded two places by the AvD, with Benz and Canello-Durkopp to compete in the trials for the third entry. However, neither competitor showed up at the eliminating trial, and the Mercedes were withdrawn as both cars that had been built with the required all-German parts had been sold, and the manufacturer determined there was insufficient time to build any more. As such, there was no German entry in the Gordon Bennett Cup race.

The British were to be represented in the event by Selwyn Edge driving a Napier. On the way from Britain to France, Edge had reservations about the Dunlop tires fitted to the car and elected to replace them with tires of foreign manufacture making the car ineligible for the Gordon Bennett race. As a result, Edge transferred his entry to the open Paris-Bordeaux event leaving only the French to compete in the Gordon Bennett Cup race.

France entered their maximum three entries, but unlike the previous year there was no ballot for selection, instead the ACF simply announced they would be represented by Léonce Girardot and Fernand Charron driving Panhards and Alfred Velghe, who raced under the pseudonym Levagh, driving a Mors.

== Race ==
Fernand Charron was the first of the cars to depart from the start line, but almost immediately came to a halt and made some adjustments to his car before continuing. Levagh, the second car to start had already overtaken Charron by the time they reached Versailles. Charron continued to stop along the route due to valve problems with his Panhard car before eventually retiring from the race at Vendome. Léonce Girardot and Levegh continued through the neutralised section at Tours. At Sainte-Maure, Levegh collided with a gutter, which damaged his car to the extent that he could not continue the race, leaving Girardot as the sole remaining Gordon Bennett competitor.

Girardot reached the finish at Bordeaux to claim the Gordon Bennett cup for France again, averaging 37 mph over the course. By contrast the winner of the open race held concurrently over the same route, Henri Fournier, had averaged 53mph in his Mors, and Girardot's time saw him placed tenth in the open race.

== Classification ==
Pos	Driver	Constructor	Time/Retired
1	(France) Léonce Girardot (FRA)	Panhard	8:50:59
Ret	(France) Levegh (FRA)	Mors	Tyres
Ret	(France) Fernand Charron (FRA)	Panhard	Collision/Gearbox
