= Pöge =

Pöge or Poege is a German surname. Notable people with the surname include:

- Thomas Pöge (born 1979), German bobsledder
- Willy Pöge (1869–1914), German engineer and racing car driver

== See also ==
- Poage
