= 1898 Paris–Amsterdam–Paris =

The 1898 Paris–Amsterdam–Paris Race was a competitive 'city to city' motor race which ran over 7 days from 7–13 July 1898 and covered 1,431 km. It was won by Fernand Charron driving a Panhard et Levassor for 33 hours at an average speed of 43 km/h over unsurfaced roads.

The event was organised by the Automobile Club de France (ACF) and was sometimes retrospectively known as the III Grand Prix de l'A.C.F.

== Results ==
Paris-Amsterdam-Paris Race - 7–13 July 1898 - 1,431 km The Categorie Vitesse (Speed category) was sub-divided into classes 'A' - vehicles with 2-3 seats; 'B' - (vehicles with 4 seats and 'C' - General.

=== Overall ===
The overall results for class A in the 'Categorie Vitesse' were:

Pos	No	Driver	Car	Time	Notes
1		(France) Fernand Charron	Panhard & Levassor	33:04:34	43.26 km/h
2		(France) Léonce Girardot	Panhard & Levassor	33:25:18	
3		(France) "Gaudry" (Etienne Giraud)	Amédée Bollée	34:08:58	
4		(Belgium) Rene de Knyff	Panhard & Levassor	34:58:50	
5		(France) René Loysel	Amédée Bollée	35:19:09	
6		(France) Adam	Panhard & Levassor	35:45:57	
7		(France) Auguste Doriot	Peugeot	36:20:47	
8		(France) Émile Kraeutler	Peugeot	38:26:55	
9		(France) Levegh (Alfred Velghe)	Mors	38:41:02	
10		(France) Antony	Peugeot	39:30:14	
11		(France) E. Chesnay	Mors	43:58:40	
12		(France) Gilles Hourgières	Panhard & Levassor	46:50:19	
13		(United States) George Heath	Panhard & Levassor	48:58:26	
14		(France) Parix	Panhard & Levassor	52:30:58	
15		(France) Védrine	Georges Richard	57:27:05	

=== Stage Winners ===
The stage winners were:

Stage	Itinerary	Length	Driver	Car	Time	Speed	Notes
1	Champigny-Chateau d'Ardenne	294.90	(France) Fernand Charron	Panhard & Levassor	6:56:07s	42.52 km/h	
2	Chateau d'Ardenne-Nijmegen	251.35	(France) Gilles Hourgières	Panhard & Levassor	6:00:23s	41.84 km/h	
3	Nijmegen-Amsterdam	112.00	(France) Léonce Girardot	Panhard & Levassor	2:20:40s	47.77 km/h	
4	Amsterdam-Liège	269.55	(France) Fernand Charron	Panhard & Levassor	5:30:43s	48.90 km/h	
5	Liège-Verdun	259.90	(France) "Gaudry"(Etienne Giraud)	Amédée Bollée	5:57:09s	43.66 km/h	
6	Verdun-Paris	243.30	(France) Fernand Charron	Panhard & Levassor	5:34:08s	43.69 km/h	

=== Did not finish ===
Entrants who did not finish :

Did Not Finish Driver	No.	Car	stages completed	Notes
Amédée Bollée		Amédée Bollée	3 stages	
Gustave Leys		Panhard & Levassor	3 stages	
Roscoff		Mors	3 stages	
Vinet		Amédée Bollée	3 stages	
Baron de Turkheim		Amédée Bollée	2 stages	
Breuil		Peugeot	2 stages	
A. Koechlin		Peugeot	1 stage	
Marcellin		De Dion-Bouton tricycle	0 stages	
Max Richard		Georges Richard	0 stages	
Georges Richard		Georges Richard	0 stages	

== See also ==
- Paris–Rouen (motor race)
- Paris–Bordeaux–Paris
- 1896 Paris–Marseille–Paris
