= Poage =

Poage is a surname. Notable people with the surname include:

- Chester Poage (1980–2000), American murder victim
- George Poage (1880–1962), American athlete
- Ray Poage (1940–1997), American football player
- William R. Poage (1899–1987), American politician

== See also ==
- Pöge
