= Charron-Laycock =

French automobile manufacturer

- Company type: Ltd.
- Founded: 1919
- Defunct: 1930
- Headquarters: Puteaux, France
- Key people: Fernand Charron
- Products: Automobiles

Charron-Laycock is an English automobile manufacturer founded in 1919 by Davison Dalziel following the merger of the companies Charron Limited (formerly Automobiles Charron-Girardot-Voigt (CGV) founded in 1902 by Fernand Charron, Léonce Girardot and Émile Voigt) and W.S. Laycock founded by William Samuel Laycock.

Producing around 300 vehicles a year at the beginning of the 20th century, its clients included Charles I, Louis Blériot, André Michelin, William Kissam Vanderbilt and James Gordon Bennett Jr. Charron-Laycock was hailed as the Rolls-Royce of small cars by The Times in 1921.

== Automobiles Charron, Girardot et Voigt (CGV) ==
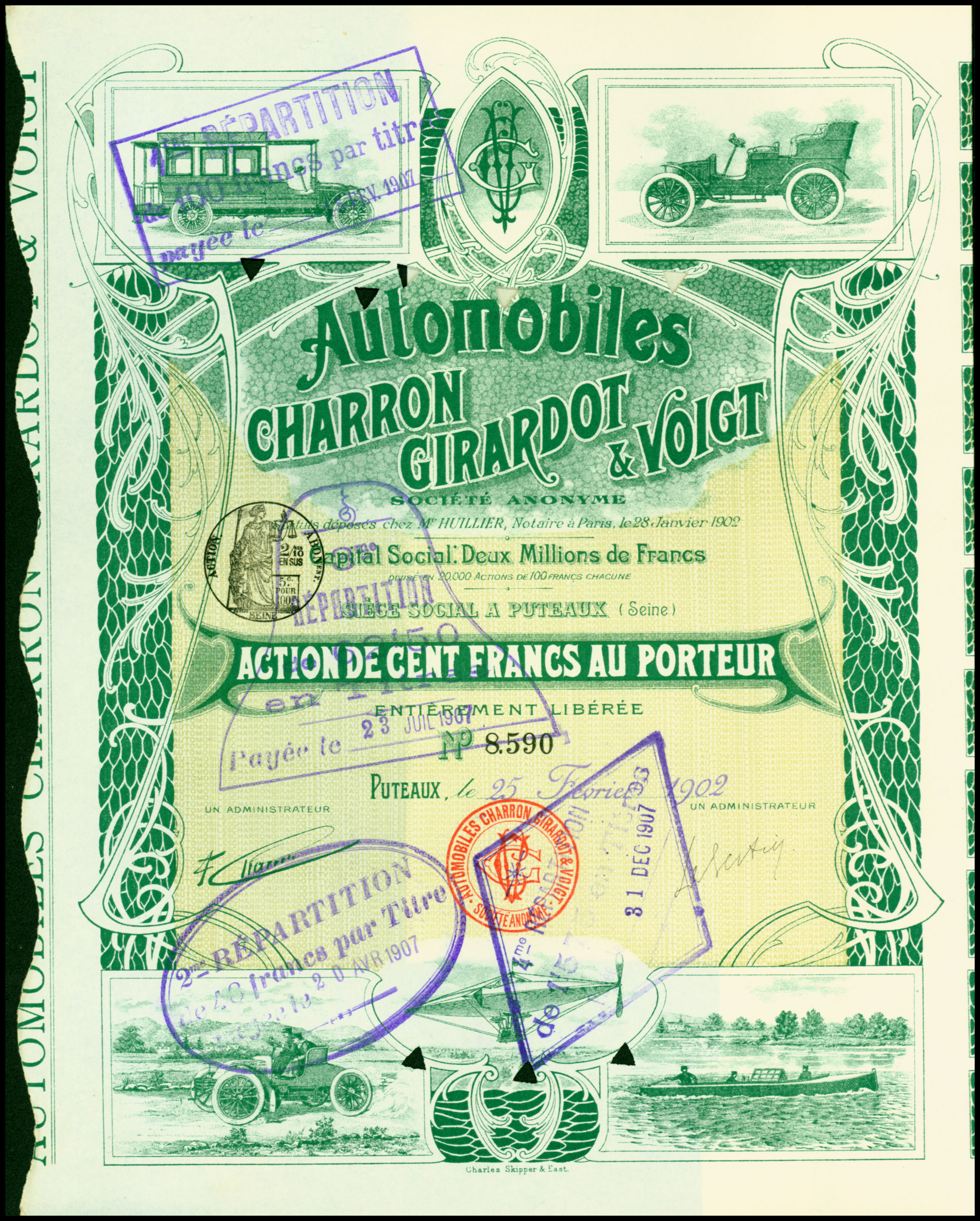
Share of the Automobiles Charron, Girardot & Voigt SA, issued 25. February 1902

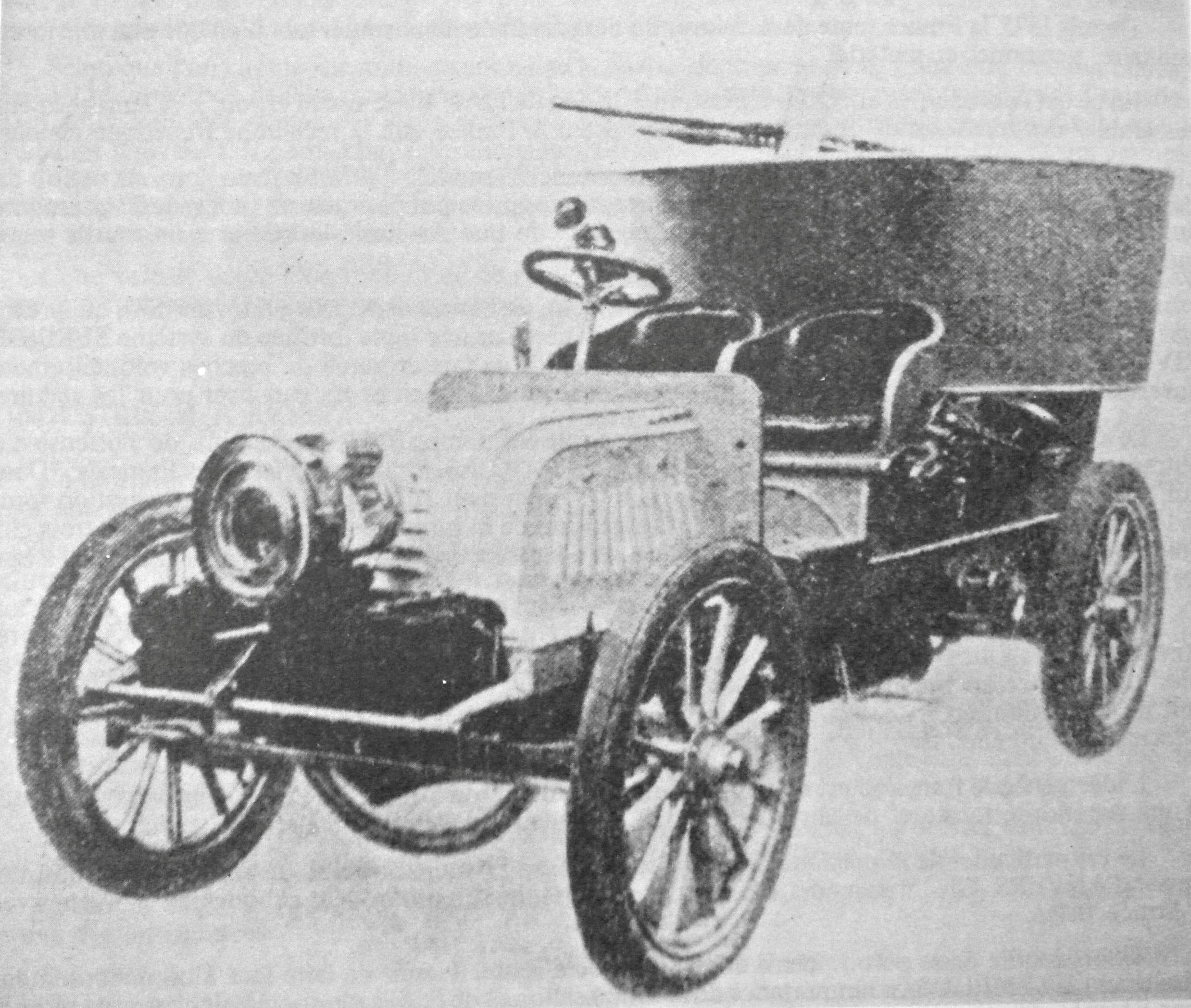
The Charron, Girardot et Voigt 1902

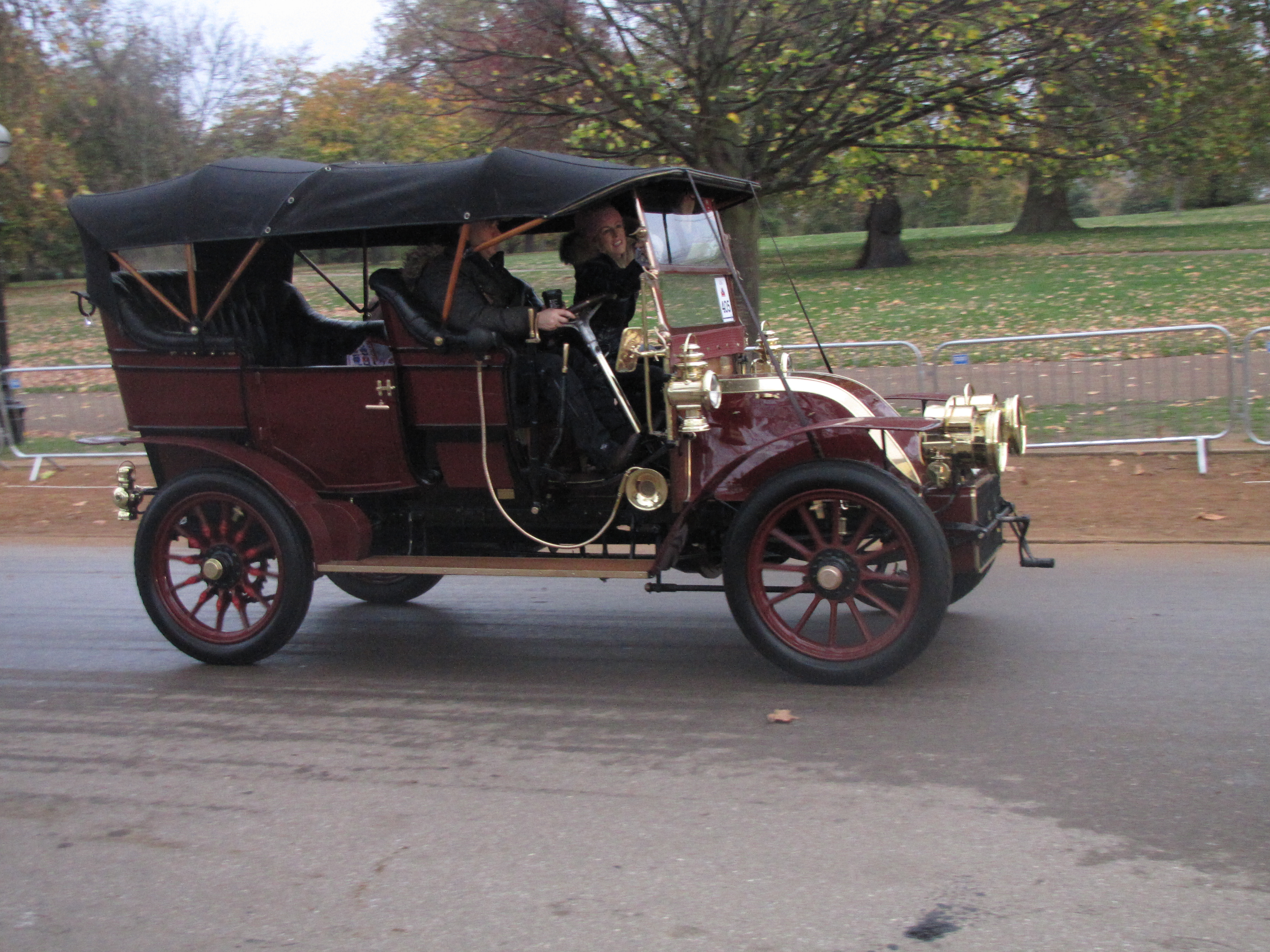
Charron, Girardot et Voigt tonneau 1904

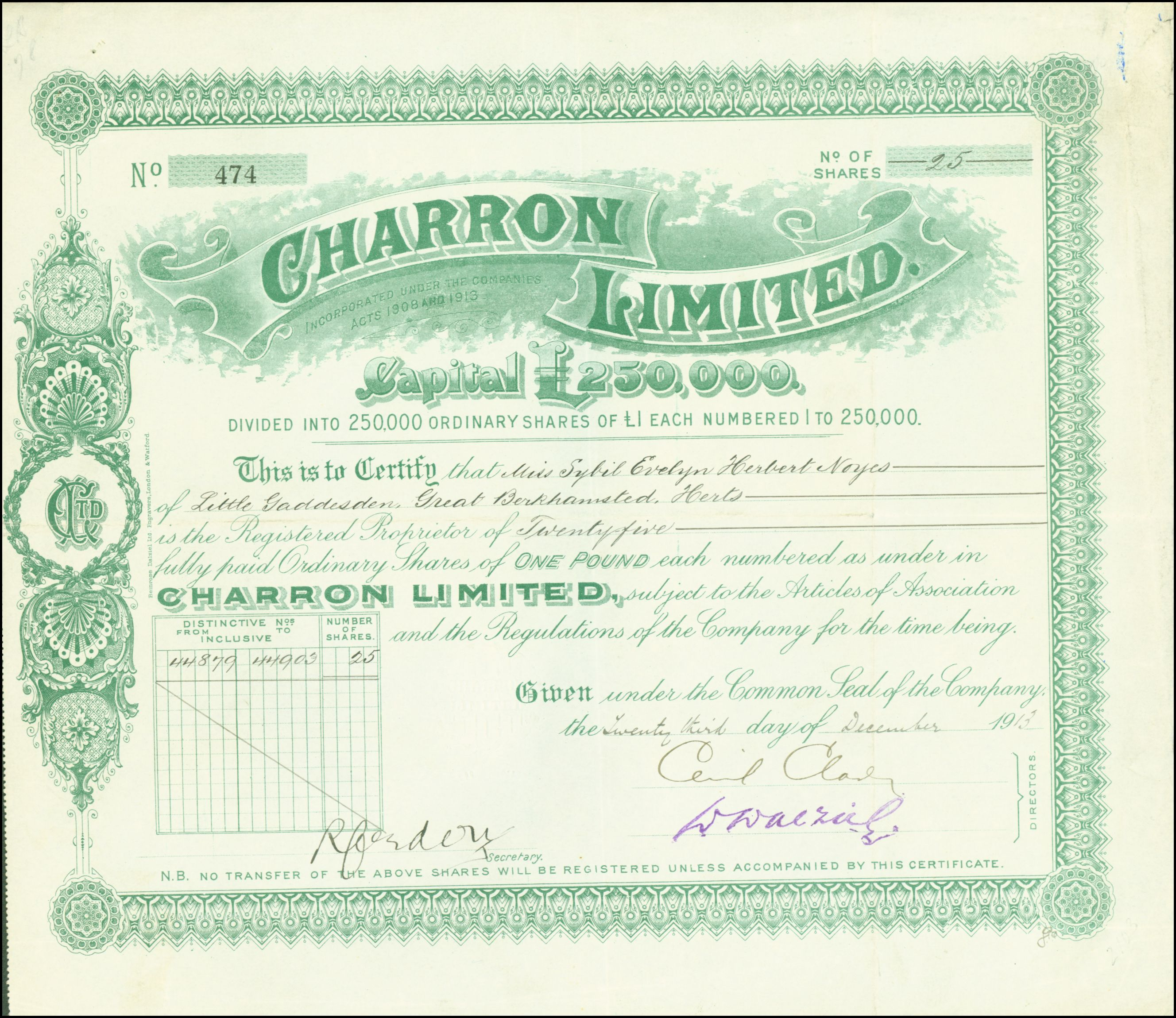
Ordinary Share of the Charron Ltd., issued 23. December 1913

.

Automobiles Charron, Girardot & Voigt SA (trade mark C.G.V.) was a French motor manufacturer founded by the racing cyclists and motorists Fernand Charron, Léonce Girardot and Émile Voigt. It was based at 7 rue Ampère in Puteaux, approximately 8.7 kilometres (5.4 mi) from the central Paris.

They opened one of the first French car dealerships in 1897, on Avenue de la Grande Armée in Paris and raced Panhard et Levassors in the major motoring events. Automobiles Charron, Girardot et Voigt SA showed their first car in 1901. In 1904, they produced 216 cars with 4 cylinder engines, which sold for up to £1200 in England. In 1905, Voigt was sole importer to the USA of C.G.V. cars.

The company produced a total of around 300 vehicles per year. Customers for these expensive automobiles included Charles I, Louis Blériot, André Michelin, William Kissam Vanderbilt and James Gordon Bennett Jr.

In 1905 the Countess of Béarn, born Martine de Béhague (1870-1939), one of the most famous personalities of the Parisian aristocracy and a great art collector, acquired a luxurious 20-horsepower limousine coupe.

In 1905 the company had capital of 2 franc million.

== Charron Limited ==
Davison Dalziel, buys the company which takes the trading name of Charron Limited and whose head office is based in London at 32 Old Jewry, in London.

== Charron-Laycock ==
In 1919, Davison Dalziel became chairman of W.S. Laycock Limited following the death of chairman William Samuel Laycock in 1916. Charron Limited and W.S. Laycock merged to form the company Charron-Laycock. The first model of the Charron-Laycock was by designer William Francis Bennet Milward.

In 1921, W. S. Laycock built the chassis for this car, considered the Rolls-Royce of small cars. Demand exceeded supply. The manufacturers were able to take advantage of the experience of French manufacturers because it incorporated the best elements of English and French design.

== All change ==
Girardot resigned in 1906 and Charron left the company in the same year; but with the help of a major cash contribution from investors in England he was able to found Charron Limited, the factory and administrative offices at the same location in Puteaux as before. The suffix at the end of the manufacturer's new name nevertheless reflected its legal status as a London-based company with a head office at 32 Old Jewry, in London.

Charron's commitment to the cars that bore his name was less than whole-hearted at this time. In 1908 Charron himself joined Clément-Bayard, where he both married and divorced the boss's youngest daughter, Jeanne Clément-Bayard, and worked as manager of the factory at Levallois-Perret. Shortly before the outbreak of the war, he seriously contemplated selling the Puteaux factory, but instead he used it to build cars for Alda, another automobile company, which he had set up in 1912.

Thanks to purchases by the army, the Charron company made it through the war.

== After the war ==
After peace broke out Charron, not without difficulty, divested himself of the Alda business, selling it in 1920 to the Compagnie Générale d'Électricité (CGE) who would continue with the brand, selling cars produced at the Farman automobile factory, for almost another year.

Fernand Charron now concentrated on the cars that carried his own name. By 1919 the company was offering seven models, though it is not clear if these were all production ready, and a year later the range was down to a more sustainable three models.

Through the 1920s Charron was one of the many automakers operating in the Paris area. A certain restlessness seems to have been an enduring feature of Fernand Charron's business strategy, and by the time of the 19th Paris Motor Show, at which the manufacturer displayed a somewhat lacklustre trio of cars, Charron's own energies were focused on a Citroën dealership which he had recently acquired. It was also reported that he had recently acquired a significant chunk of the share capital in this rapidly expanding "quai de Javel" auto-maker, whose pioneering role in introducing mass production to France was now placing increasing pressure on the country's smaller auto-makers.

Towards the end of the decade, however, the economics of auto-production were changing, and by the late 1920s production was running down as the larger French auto-makers were able to out compete the many second tier manufacturers: 1930 was the final year of production.

== The cars ==
=== Pre-war ===
In 1908 Charron introduced their own types but some of the Charron, Girardot et Voigt models were still listed up to 1912. The largest now was a 6782 cc 30 hp and the smallest an 8 hp 1205 cc twin cylinder. All the cars were available with shaft drive and the small 8 hp had a dashboard radiator of the type made familiar by Renault. This was to feature across the range in 1909.

A six-cylinder 3617 cc 30 hp joined the range in 1910 and a new small 845 cc Charronette appeared in 1914.

=== 1919 Motor show ===
Regardless of the number of different models listed, at the 15th Paris Motor Show in October 1919 Charron exhibited on their stand just two cars:

- The 6 HP "Charron Type TC" represented a return for the prewar "Charronette". The 4-cylinder engine had grown to 1057 cc and the radiator was moved in front of the engine. The car sat on a 2,300 mm (90.6 in) wheelbase.
- The 15 HP "Charron Type PGM" also used a 4-cylinder engine, but this one was of 3392 cc, and its wheelbase was a formidable 3,420 mm (134.6 in).

Not on display at the show, but nevertheless announced for 1920, was a new "Charron Type A" with a 4-cylinder 2,995 cc engine and a 3,360 mm (132.3 in) wheelbase.

=== 1924 Motor Show ===
Five years later the manufacturer was still taking a stand at the motor show, but by now only smaller "light cars" were on offer. Still present was the 1057 cc (6/8 HP) "Charronette". (still essentially of pre-war design). It was joined by the 1502 cc (10 HP) "Charron Type CV2" and the 1843 cc (12/14 HP) "Charron Type CV1". Most of the prices were listed as available "on application" but the little "Type TD / Charonnette" was listed at 16,000 francs for a "Torpedo" bodied car and 18,000 francs for a "Conduite interieure" (two-box sedan/saloon/berline) version. The prices were not particularly high, but the cars were not particularly modern or inspiring.

=== Later years ===
Four wheel brakes were added in 1925.

In 1930, the final year of production the range consisted of the 12/14CV from 1925, an enlarged Charronette and a six-cylinder 1806 cc model.

== Motor-boats ==
In May 1905 Madame Camille du Gast competed in the trans-Mediterranean race from Algiers to Toulon, having built the 13-metre (43 ft) steel-hulled Camille specifically for the event, fitted with a 90-horsepower Charron, Girardot et Voigt engine.

== Gallery ==
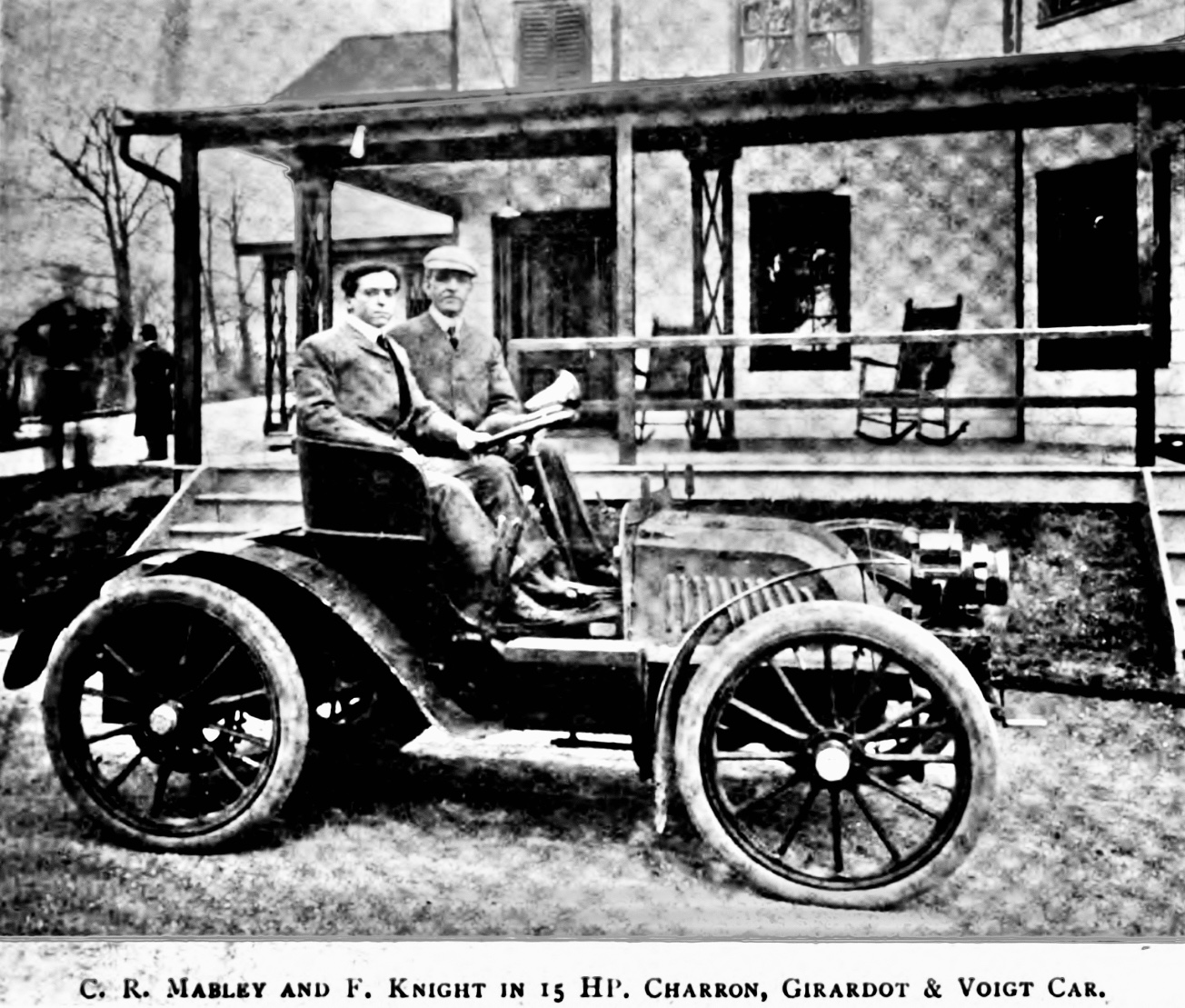
Charron, Girardot & Voigt 15 HP (1902).

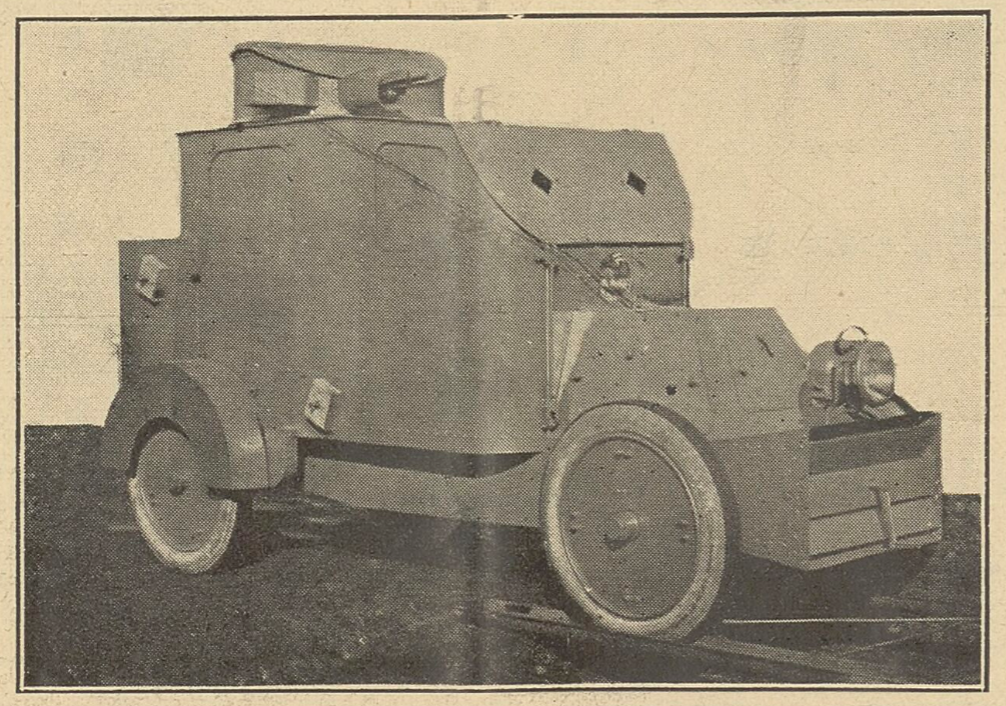
Char Charron (1905).

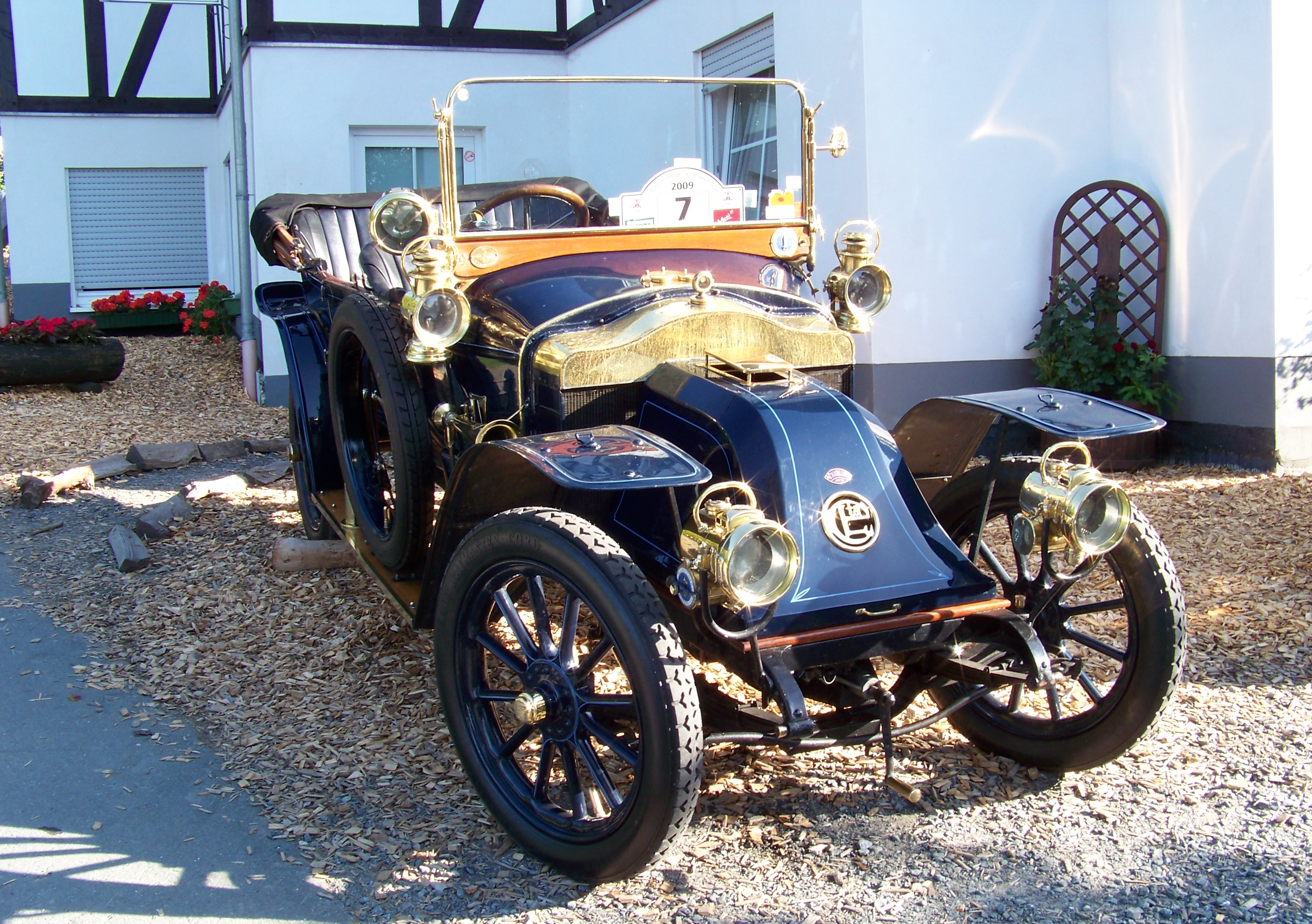
Charron Limited.

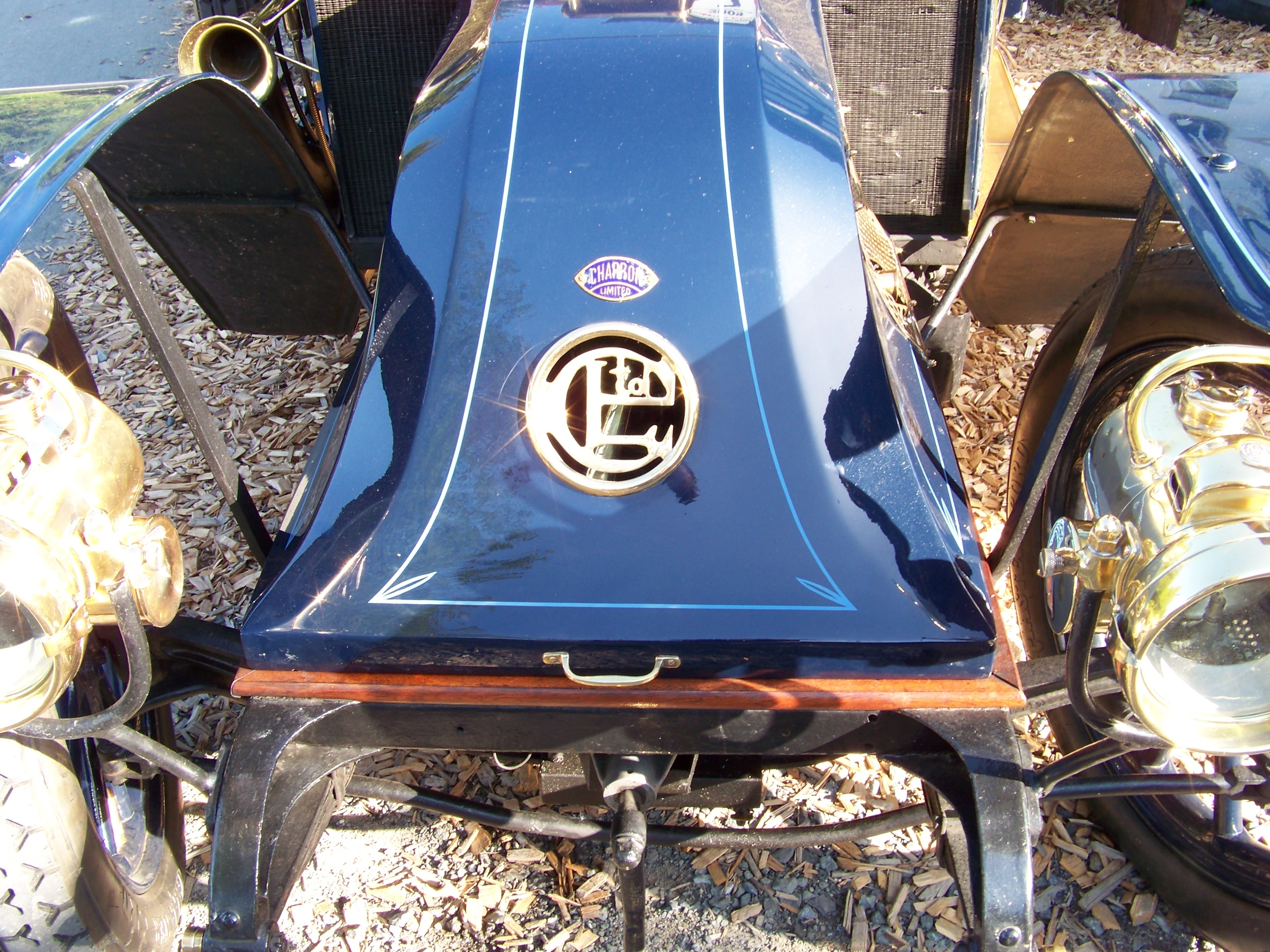
Charron Limited.

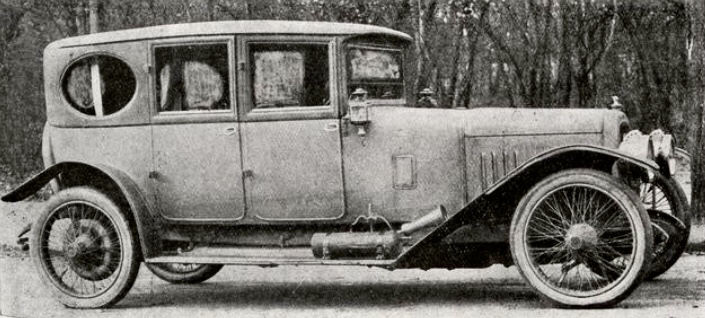
Charron 15 HP (1919).
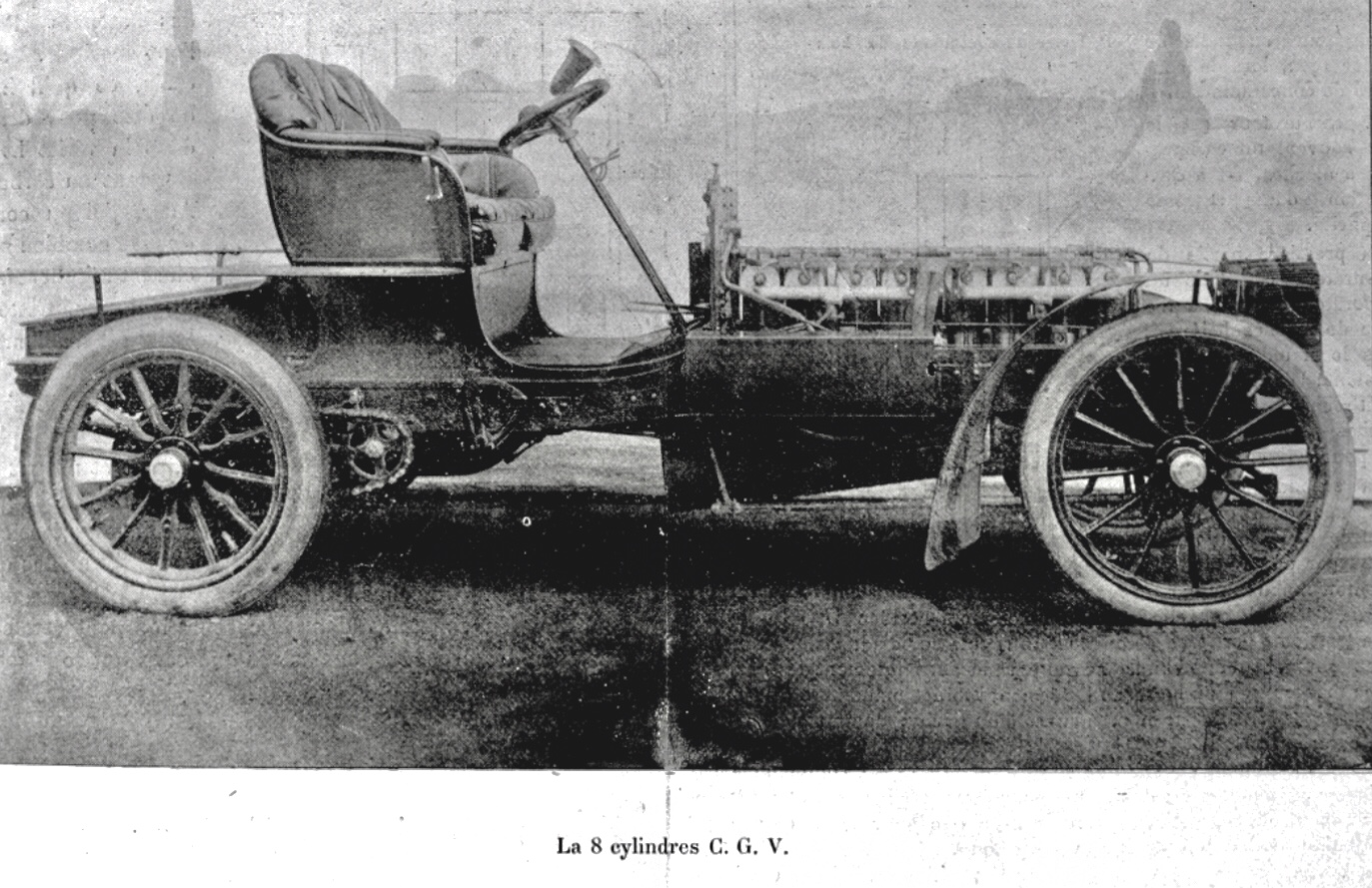
C.G.V. 1903.

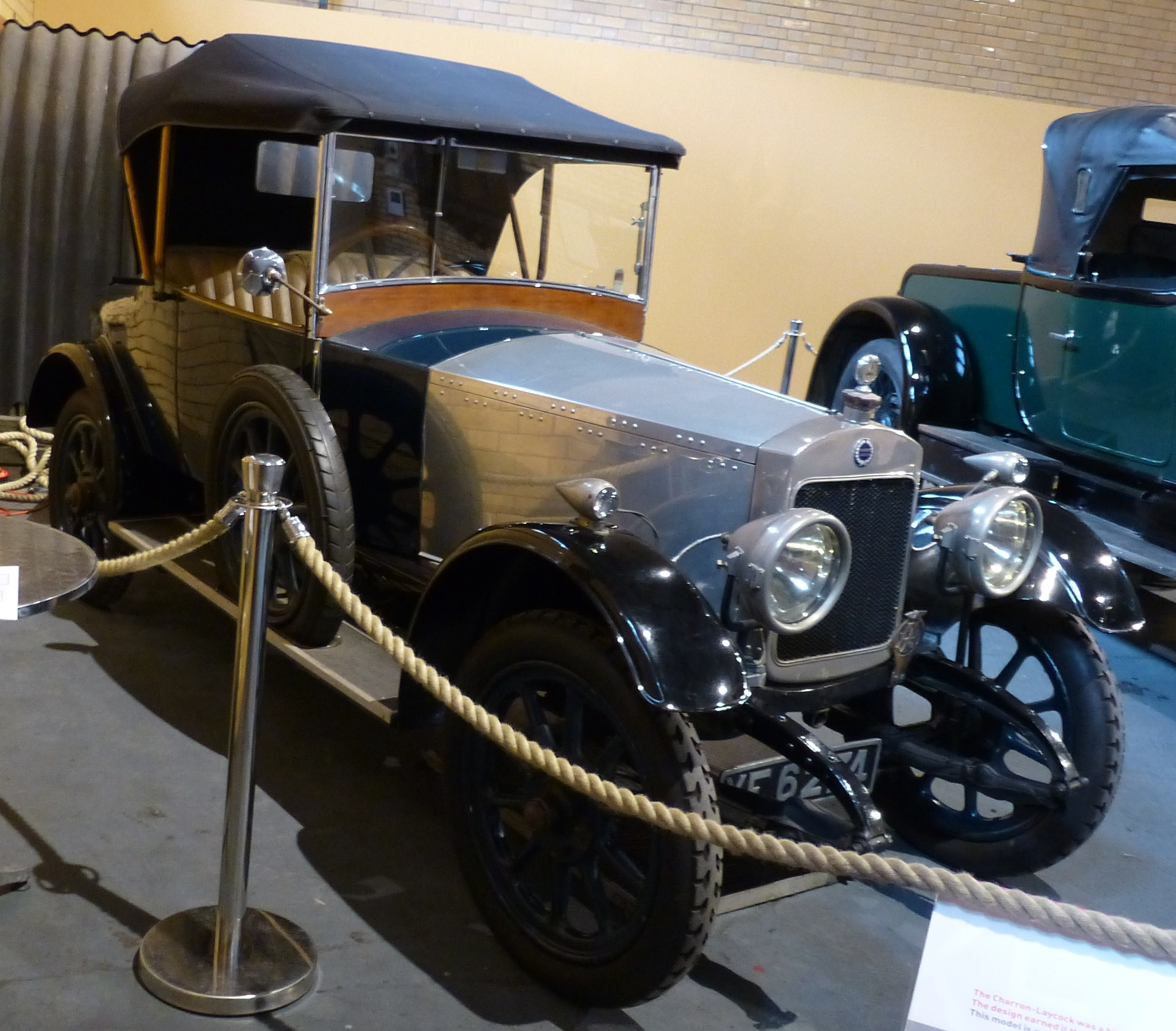
Charron- Laycock (1922).

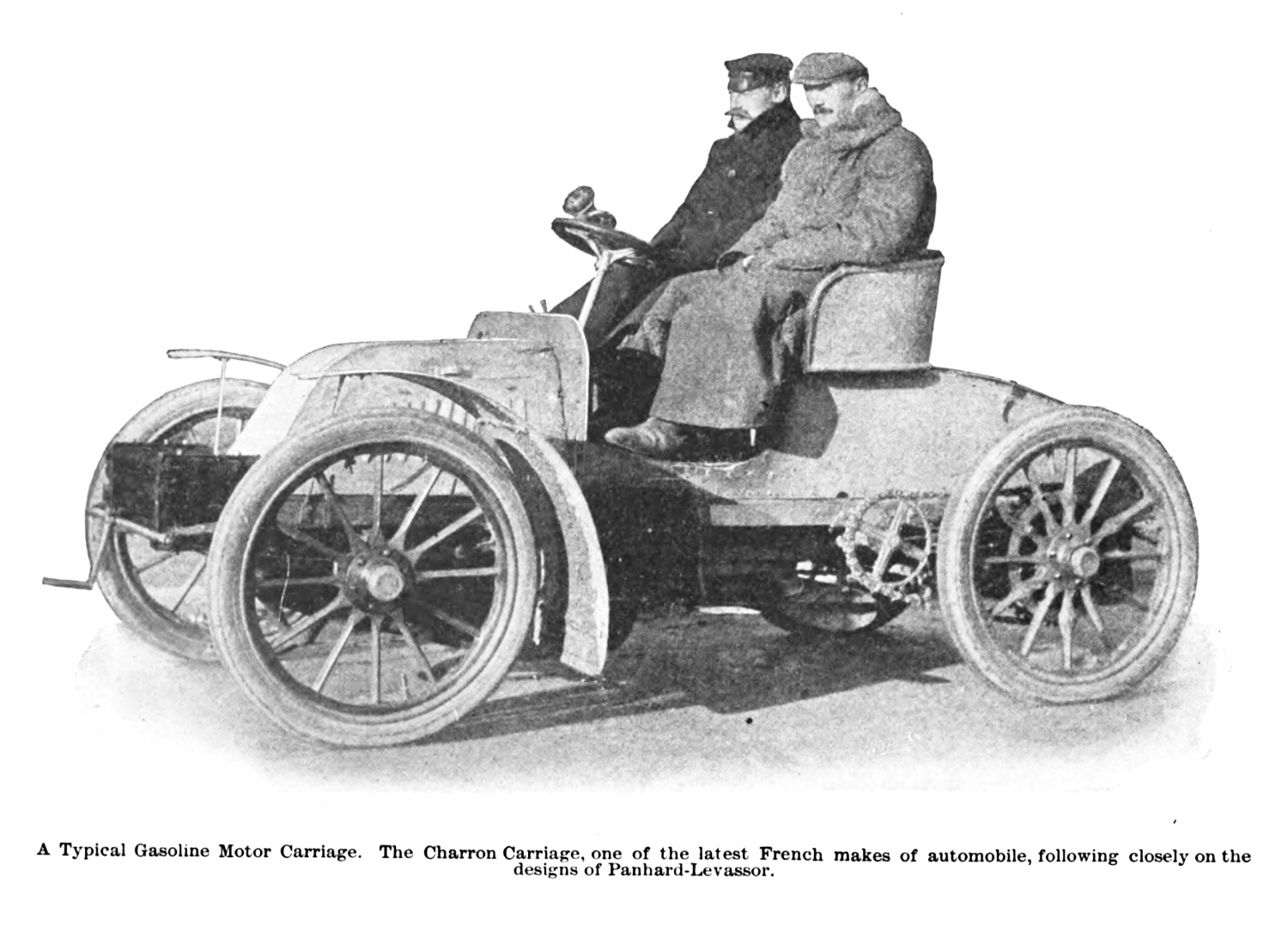
Charron C.G.V. (1903)

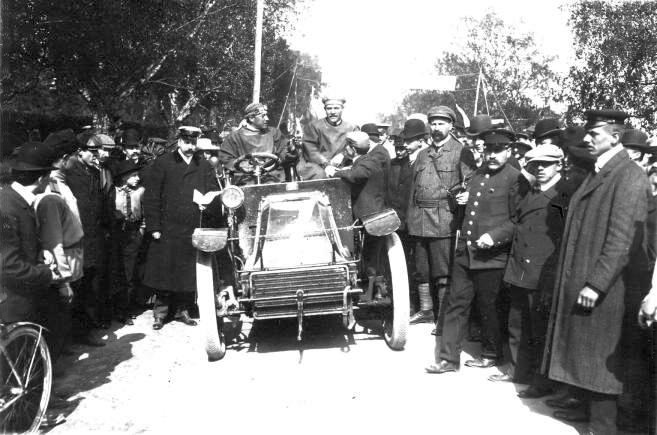
René Champoiseau with Charron Limited 30 HP in Saint Petersburg-Moscou (1907).

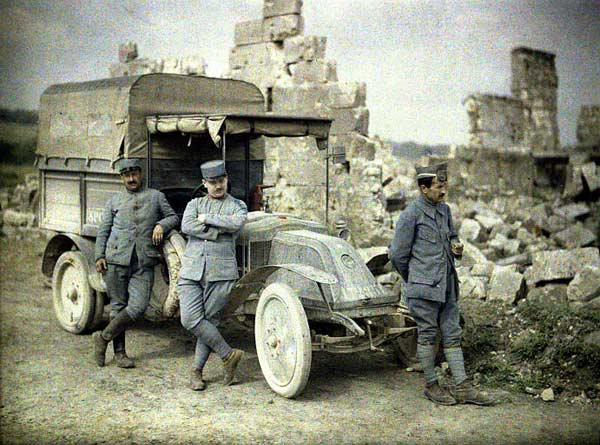
Limited use by SPCA (1917)

== See also ==
- Fernand Charron
- Charron, Girardot et Voigt
