= 1904 Gordon Bennett Cup =

- Pre-1906 Grand Prix seasons
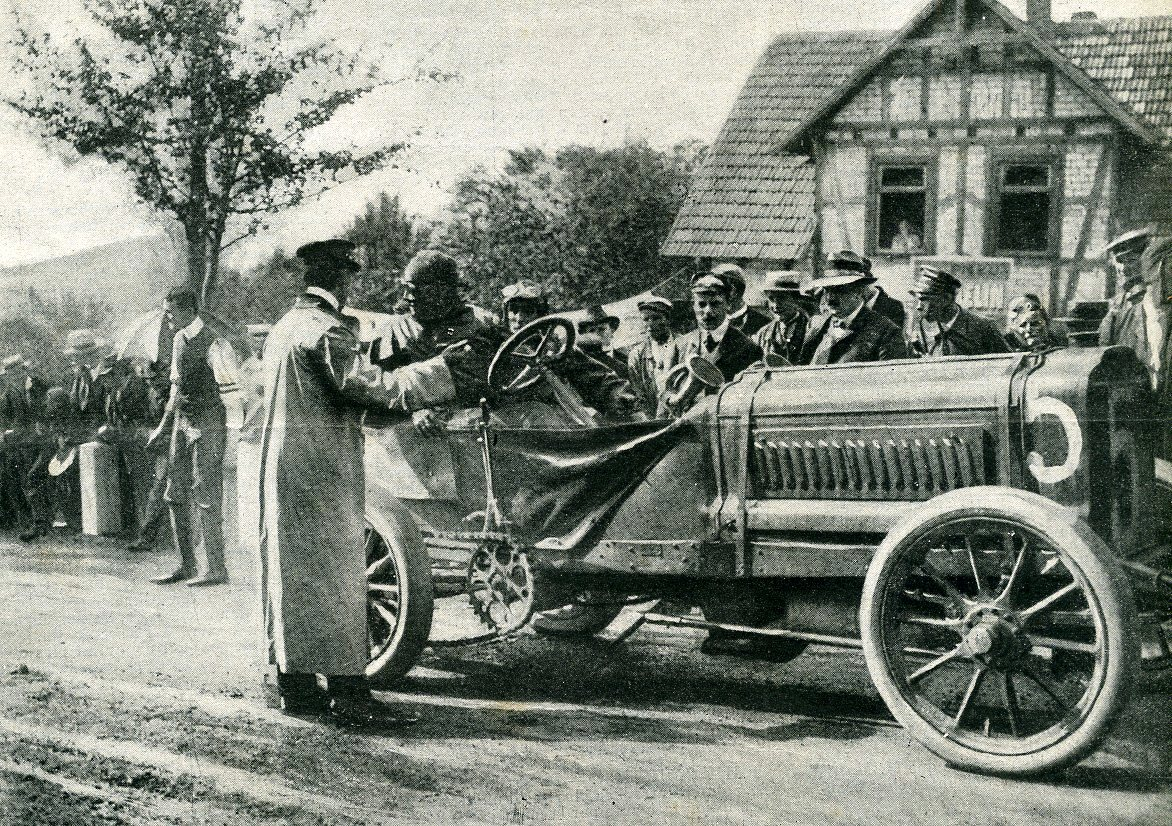
- The winner Léon Théry and copilot on their Richard-Brasier

Race details
- Date: 17 June 1904
- Official name: V Coupe Internationale
- Location: Taunus, Germany
- Course length: 128 km (79.465 miles)
- Distance: 4 laps, 512 km (317.86 miles)

Podium
First	(France) Léon Théry (FRA)	Richard-Brasier
Second	(Belgium) Camille Jenatzy (BEL)	Mercedes
Third	(France) Henri Rougier (FRA)	Turcat-Méry

The 1904 Gordon Bennett Cup, formally titled the V Coupe Internationale, was a motor race held on 17 June 1904 on the Homburg Circuit in Germany. The race consisted of four laps of the circuit to make the total distance 527 km (327.46 miles). A German entry had won the previous year's edition of the race, which meant that the rights to host the race fell to the Automobilclub von Deutschland (AvD). Germany was to attempt to defend the Gordon Bennett Cup against France, Great Britain, Austria and Italy, and each country was represented by three entries, with the car that finished the race in the shortest time winning the race on behalf of its country.

The race was won by Léon Théry driving a Richard-Brasier and representing France in a time of five hours and 50 minutes. Camille Jenatzy driving a Mercedes and representing Germany finished in second place and Henri Rougier driving a Turcat-Méry and representing France finished in third place.

== Race report ==
The Times reported that the 1904 Gordon Bennett motor race took place in Germany on June 17, over 342 miles (550 km), consisting of four laps of a course in the Taunus Forest, in the vicinity of Bad Homburg. (The venue was suggested by Kaiser Wilhelm II.) From Saalburg the course ran north to Usingen, where there was a control point (for observation by course marshals), then through Grävenwiesbach to Weilburg, where there was a second control point, then past Allendorf and Obertiefenbach to Limburg. The Obertiefenbach-Limburg stage was the fastest of the event, enabling speeds of up to 150 km/h (93 mph). At Limburg there was another control point. From there, the route was by way of Kirberg and Neuhof, where there was a very bad turn, then Idstein where there was another control point. It then ran through Glashütten to Königstein (a control point), then through Friedrichshof and the Oberursel control point to the Homburg control point and back to Saalburg.

Officiating were Baron von Molitor of the Automobilclub von Deutschland, the official starter, and M. Tampier of the Automobile Club de France, who was timekeeper. The chronographs for timing the event were supplied by the Anglo-Swiss firm of Stauffer, Son & Co. Officials from the other competing counties were also present.

There were 18 starters from eight countries, including three British entrants. The first car started from Saalburg at 7 a.m. The winner was France's Léon Théry, who accomplished the four laps in 5 h 50 min 3 s, an average speed of 58.62 mph (94.34 km/h). With each of his lap times within 3 minutes of the other, he earned his nickname of "the Chronometer". Jenatzy was second, driving a Mercedes. The only British competitor placed was Sidney Girling driving a Wolseley. Australia's Selwyn Edge, the 1902 winner who again drove a Napier, was reported to have held a good position during the first two laps, but was disqualified on lap three after receiving outside assistance due to tyre problems.

== Classification ==
Pos	Driver	starting for	Constructor	Time/Retired	Image
1	(France) Léon Théry (FRA)	France	Richard-Brasier	5:50:01	
2	(Belgium) Camille Jenatzy (BEL)	Germany	Mercedes	6:01:29	
3	(France) Henri Rougier (FRA)	France	Turcat-Méry	6:47:10	
4	(Belgium) Pierre de Caters (BEL)	Germany	Mercedes	6:47:30	
5	(Austria) Edgar Braun (AUT)	Austria	Mercedes	6:59:48	
6	(Belgium) Lucien Hautvast (BEL)	Belgium	Pipe	7:02:35	
7	(France) Jacques Salleron (FRA)	France	Mors	7:15:14	
8	(Italy) Vincenzo Lancia (ITA)	Italy	FIAT	7:17:52	
9	(United Kingdom) Sidney Girling (GBR)	Great Britain	Wolseley	7:22:53	
10	(Italy) Alessandro Cagno (ITA)	Italy	FIAT	7:23:35	
11	(United Kingdom) Charles Jarrott (GBR)	Great Britain	Wolseley	7:36:51	
Ret	(United Kingdom) Selwyn Edge (GBR)	Great Britain	Napier	*	
Ret	(Belgium) Pierre de Crawhez (BEL)	Belgium	Pipe	*	
Ret	(Italy) Luigi Storero (ITA)	Italy	FIAT	*	
Ret	(Austria) Johann Warden (AUT)	Austria	Mercedes	*	
Ret	(Belgium) Maurice Augieres (BEL)	Belgium	Pipe	*	
Ret	(Germany) Friedrich Franz Opel (GER)	Germany	Opel	*	
Ret		Austria	Mercedes	*	
