= Gaëtan De Knyff =

Belgian car racer & cyclist (1871–1933)

Gaëtan de Knyff, Chevalier du Saint-Empire (also Gaétan de Knyff; born: 5 May 1871 in Duffel; died: 2 April 1933 in Neuilly-sur-Seine) was a Belgian car racer and cyclist.

Gaëtan de Knyff was the son of lawyer Oscar de Knyff, Chevalier du Saint-Empire (1830–1897) and his wife Eugénie de Meurs (1846–1917). He had two sisters and two brothers. His cousin was the French car racer and sports administrator René de Knyff. De Knyff was married to Marcelle de Werbrouck (1881–1918).

At the turn of the 18th and 19th centuries, de Knyff was active in the emerging automotive sport. In 1899 he won the Brussels-Namur-Spa race in a Panhard & Levassor 16 CV. In the Paris–Bordeaux race, he finished eleventh in a Peugeot. In 1901 he took part in the Paris–Berlin race in a Panhard & Levassor 24 CV, but did not finish.

Gaétan de Knyff died in 1933 at the age of 61 in Neuilly-sur-Seine.
