= Léon Théry =

French racing driver (1879–1909)

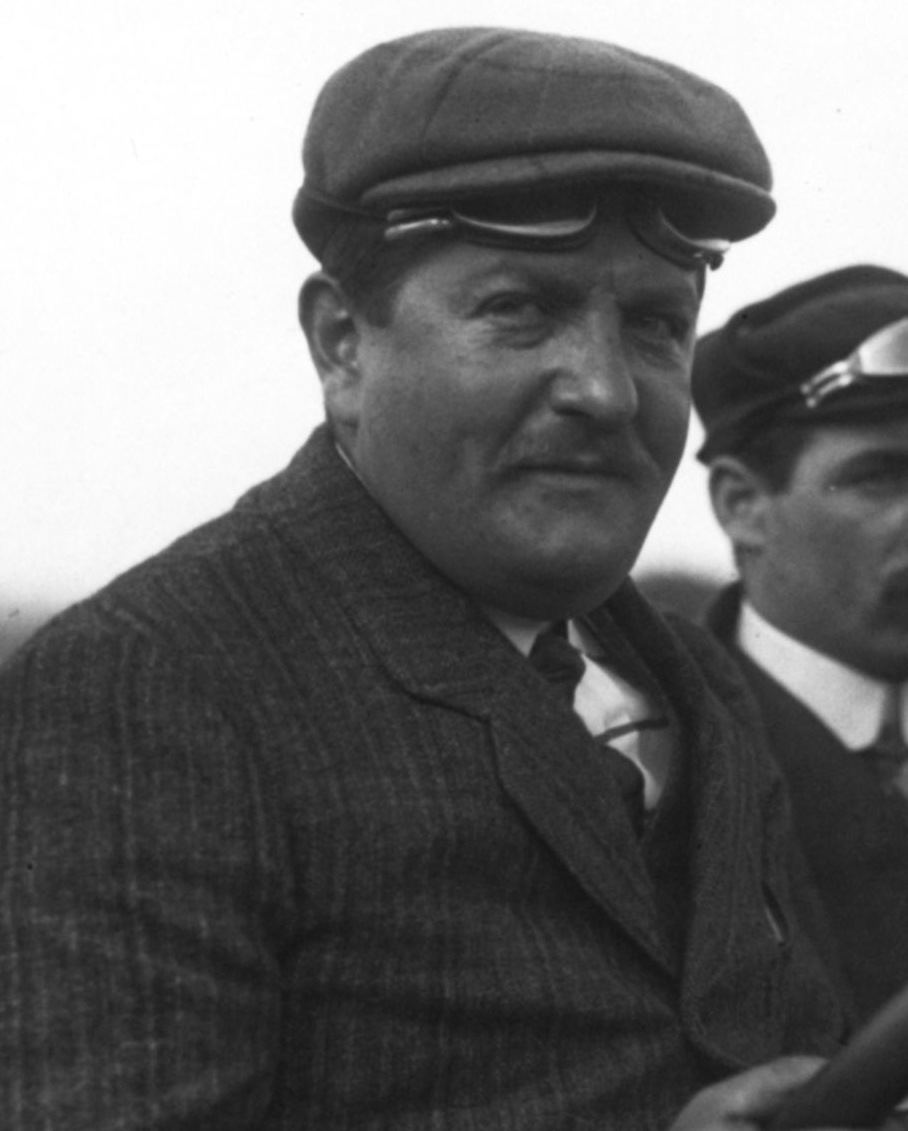
- Léon Théry in 1908
- Born: 16 April 1879; France
- Died: 8 March 1909 (aged 29); Paris, France
- Occupation: Racing driver

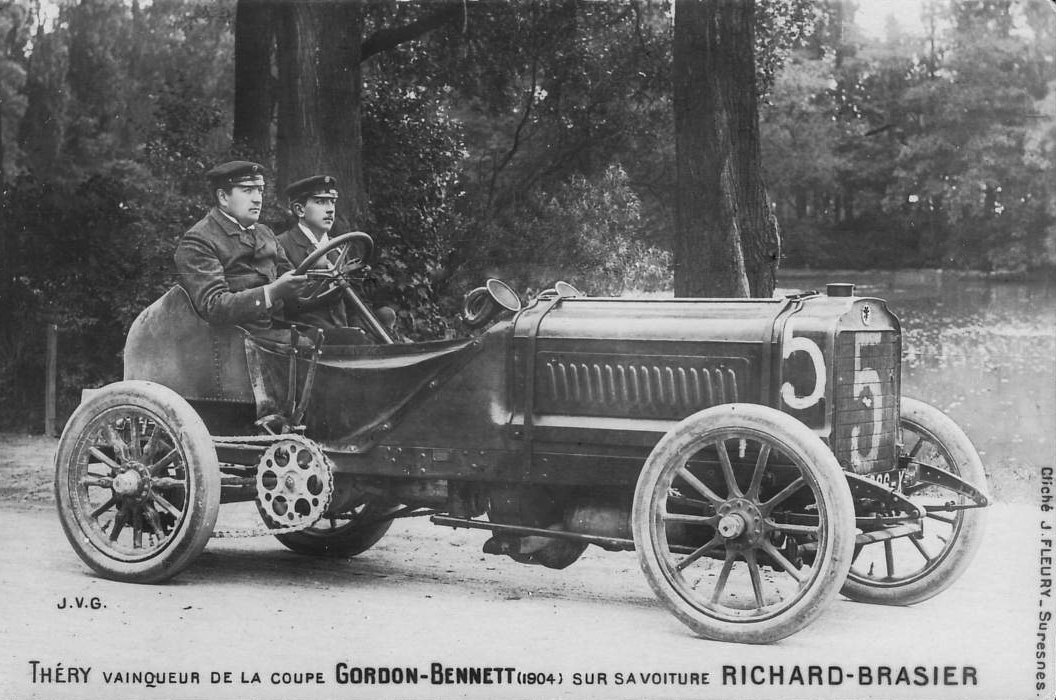
Léon Théry after winning the 1904 Gordon Bennett Cup, accompanied by his mechanic Muller in the Richard-Brasier

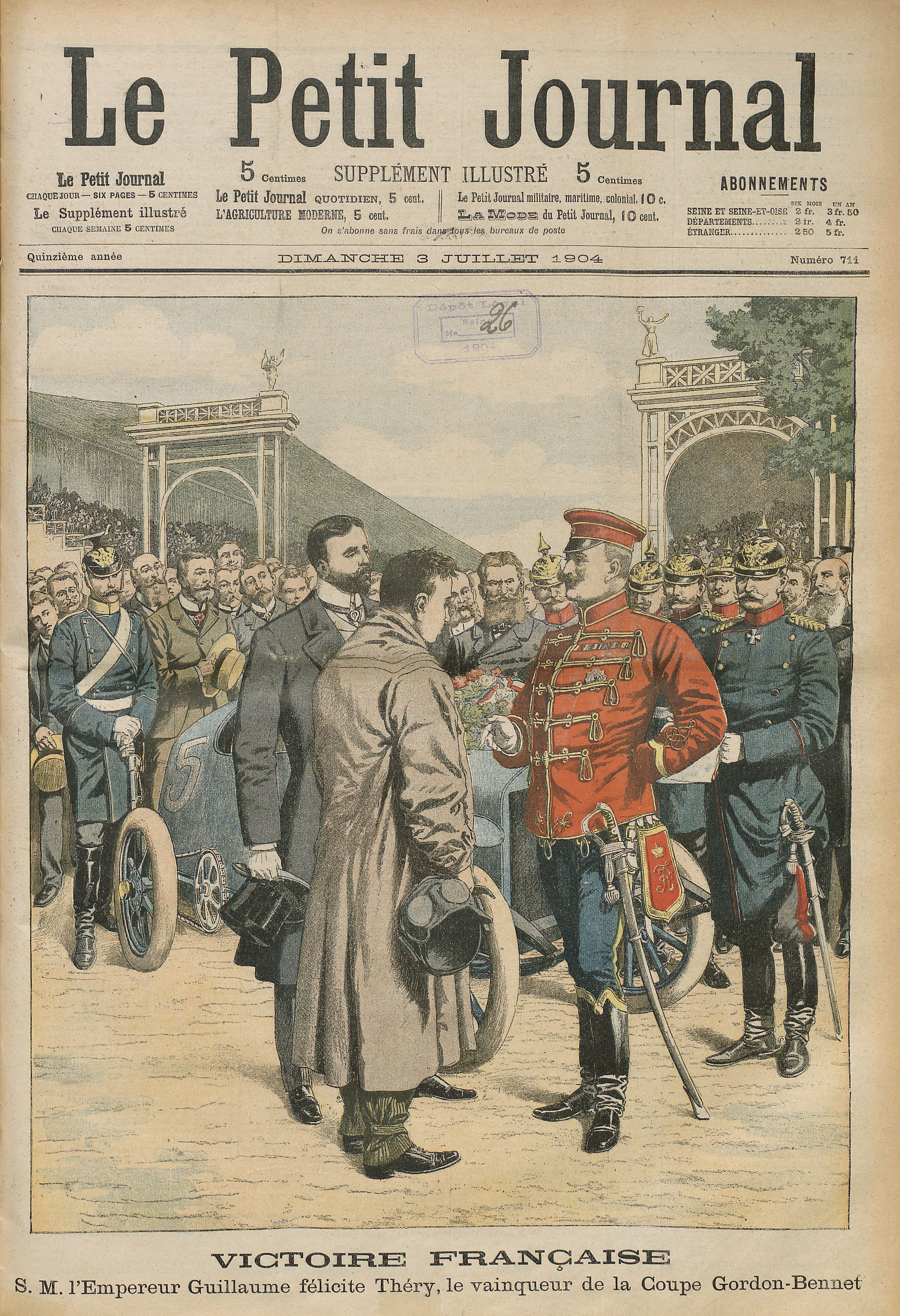
French Victory Emperor Wilhelm congratulates the winner of the Gordon-Bennett Cup. Le Petit Journal, 3 July 1904.

Léon Théry (16 April 1879 – 8 March 1909) was a French racing driver, nicknamed "Le Chronometer", who won the premier European race, the Gordon Bennett Cup, in both 1904 and 1905.

== Career ==
Théry started out as a mechanic which gave him an understanding of the need to drive according to the car's abilities, and nurse it home to victory. His nickname was "Le Chronometer", for his reliable lap times, and he became one of the top drivers in the early 1900s.

He competed respectably up until 1903, driving a Decauvillle, and became a voiturette champion. He is regarded as winning 'one of the first Voiturette races, if not the very first'.

=== 1899 ===
His first race was the Paris to Amsterdam in 1898 at the wheel of a voiturette.

=== 1899 ===
His competed was the Paris-Bordeaux city to city race in 1899. His tiller-steered Decauville voiturelle averaged less than 30 km/h (19 mph) for the 565 kilometres (351 mi) race, and when he reached Bordeaux, he was totally exhausted, struck by amnesia and was heard repeating: "“Do not stop me, I have to arrive at Bordeaux!”. Nevertheless, this was enough for second place, behind the Decauville of Gabriel, and ahead of a second teammate.

=== 1901 ===
In 1901, Théry drove a Decauville voiturelle in the Paris-Rouen-Paris race on 11/03/1900, winning the Coupe des Voiturettes (voiturette class).

Théry became renowned for his methodical documentation in a 'race log' of circuit details, road conditions, tyres, engine reliability, and car performance. He then drove scrupulously to the speed he had calculated in the race log.

=== 1902 ===
1902 was a year of trauma. He entered his Decauville in the Paris-Vienna race on 26–29 June, accompanied by his mechanic Muller. Brake failure on the Arlberg pass (1,793 m (5,883 ft)) in Austria tested all his skills in avoiding disaster. In the Ardennes Cup race on 31 July, they hit a cow at full speed.

=== 1903 ===
In 1903, Théry joined the French manufacturer Richard-Brasier.

=== 1904 ===
On 20 May 1904, Théry won the Gordon Bennett Elimination Trial at Argonne, France, driving an 80 hp (60 kW; 81 PS) Richard-Brasier.

On 17 June 1904, he won the Gordon Bennett Cup at Homburg in the Taunus mountains of Germany. The event drew entries from eight countries and was considered the single most important race in Europe. Théry's Richard-Brasier 80 hp triumphed over Camille Jenatzy's Mercedes. Each lap was 128 km (80 mi) of primitive roads, but all his lap times were within a 3-minute range.

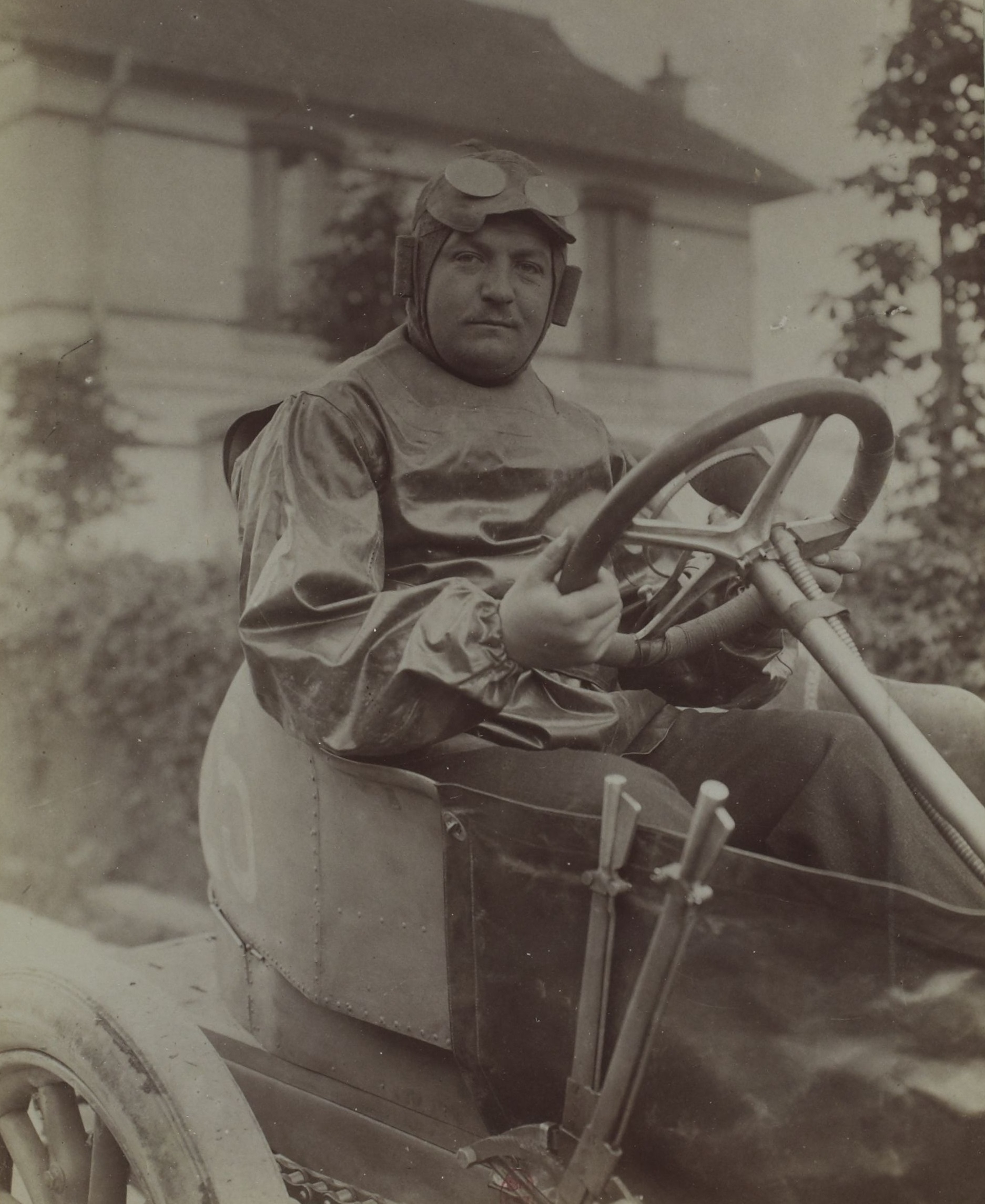
Léon Théry upon his return after winning the 1904 Gordon Bennett Cup, wearing a motoring attire by Ström Paris.

Théry's victory meant instant fame such that when he and Henri Brasier arrived in Paris they received an enthusiastic reception at the ACF premises, appearing on the balcony to acknowledge thousands of cheering Parisians. A series of banquets and festivities followed, whence - during one of them - Fernand Charron announced the subscription he had started had raised 12,200 FF. Théry was awarded the interest of a lifetime bond, and another subscription was opened for the three mechanics that had accompanied him, including Muller his riding mechanic. Brasier presented Théry with the winning car that he took to America, earning a big purse, but little racing success.

=== 1905 ===
The 1905 Gordon Bennett Cup, as agreed by its rules, was held in France, the home country of its previous winner.

On 16 June 1905, Théry won the Gordon Bennett Elimination Trial in the Auvergne, France, driving a 96 hp (72 kW; 97 PS) Richard-Brasier.

On 5 July, Théry and his riding mechanic Mueller won their second Gordon Bennett Cup, driving an eleven-litre 96Hp Richard-Brasier over 4 laps (548 km) of a circuit in the Auvergne mountains of France. Théry and Charles-Henri Brasier received a hero's welcome on the streets of Paris, before being received in the Elysée Palace by the President of France, Émile Loubet.

"Ordinary tires wouldn't have lasted 20 kilometers. That's how impressive the Michelin tires are," Léon Théry (Michelin employee) 1905.

=== 1906 onwards ===
Although his success in the 1904 and 1905 Gordon Bennett Cup events had contributed to the Automobile Club de France (ACF) organising the 1906 Grand Prix de l'Automobile Club de France, he did not enter the 1906 or 1907 French Grand Prix. He tried to build his own racing car, a financial enterprise that failed completely, and forced him to work as chauffeur for the La Vie au Grand Air reporter at the 'Bordeaux-Paris' bicycle race in May 1908.

In 1908 he returned to driving for Brasier and entered the Grand Prix of France, but he retired on the last lap of the 10 lap race with a collapsed wheel. He was running fourth overall and first of the French cars. This was the last race of his career.

=== Michelin ===
Théry worked for Michelin. Some sources report him as responsible for naming Bibendum, the Michelin Man. The rubber-man had been popular with the French public since the Michelin brothers introduced it at Lyon in 1894, and had acquired a variety of nicknames. At the 1898 Paris–Amsterdam–Paris race, Léon greeted André Michelin with a shout, "Here comes Bibendum!". Michelin immediately adopted the name (Latin for "time to drink") to show his tyres could 'drink' spikes, nails, glass, etc.

== Death and commemoration ==
Théry died of tuberculosis at the age of 29. His tomb is in the Père Lachaise Cemetery in Paris.

In 2005, the hundredth anniversary of Théry's Gordon Bennett victory in France, many events were organized. The Post Office issued a stamp and the Paris Mint struck a commemorative medal representing Théry driving his Brasier.
