= Clifford Earp =

British pioneer racing motorist

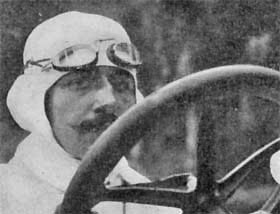
Clifford Earp

Walter Thomas Clifford Earp (1879–1921) was a British pioneer racing motorist.

He was born in 1879, in Lambeth, South London. His parents were Arthur Clifford Earp (1855–1886), a sculptor, and Emily Wood. He attended Ardingly College, Sussex. His surname was often spelled Clifford-Earp. He had a brother, also Arthur Clifford Earp, born 1 January 1883, who was also a racing motorist, and on occasion acted as his riding mechanic. He was a protégé of S. F. Edge and sometimes faced adversity, being considered a 'trade' professional in an age of amateurs.

During the eliminating trials for the Gordon Bennett Cup at Douglas, Isle of Man, in 1904 Clifford Earp, with brother Arthur acting as riding mechanic, crashed into a stone wall on the promenade, both being hospitalised.

In July 1905, Earp on a hp Napier finished eighth in The Gordon Bennett Cup on the Auvergne circuit in France.

In July 1905 Earp, on a 90-horsepower Napier, completed the flying-start kilometre in 23 seconds at the inaugural Brighton Speed Trials.

On 27 January 1906, Earp broke the world record for 100 miles' distance in a race for the Minneapolis Automobile Club trophy at Ormond-Daytona Beach, Florida on a 90 hp Napier in a time of 1 hour, 15 minutes and 40.4 seconds, with riding-mechanic H. H. Baker. At about the 35-mile mark he shed his rear tyre and completed the rest of the race on the rim.

In 1907, Earp drove his 60 hp Thames car at Brooklands to four new world records:

Distance	Time
50 miles	39 min 10 s
150 miles	1 h 58 min 34 s

Time	Distance
One hour	76 miles 453 yards
Two hours	151 miles 146 yards

The Thames motor car was manufactured by the Thames Ironworks, Shipbuilding, and Engineering Company Ltd., of Greenwich.
