= George Heath (racing driver) =

American racing driver (1862–1943)

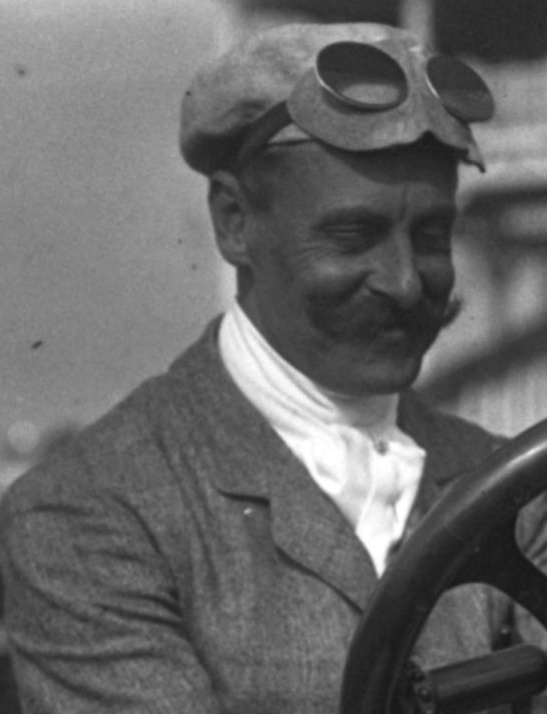
- Heath, during the 1908 French Grand Prix
- Born: circa 1862 Long Island, New York, U.S.
- Died: circa 1943 (aged 80–81) Catskill Mountains, New York, U.S.

Championship titles
- Major victories Vanderbilt Cup (1904)

George Heath (c. 1862 – c. 1943) was an American racing driver. A native Long Islander, he spent much of his adult life in France. Heath won the first Vanderbilt Cup race in 1904 driving a Panhard, and was retroactively awarded a 1904 National Championship in 1951 by revisionist sportswriter Russ Catlin. Heath returned to the Vanderbilt Cup in 1905 and placed second. He continued to race until 1909.
