= Léonce Girardot =

French racing driver

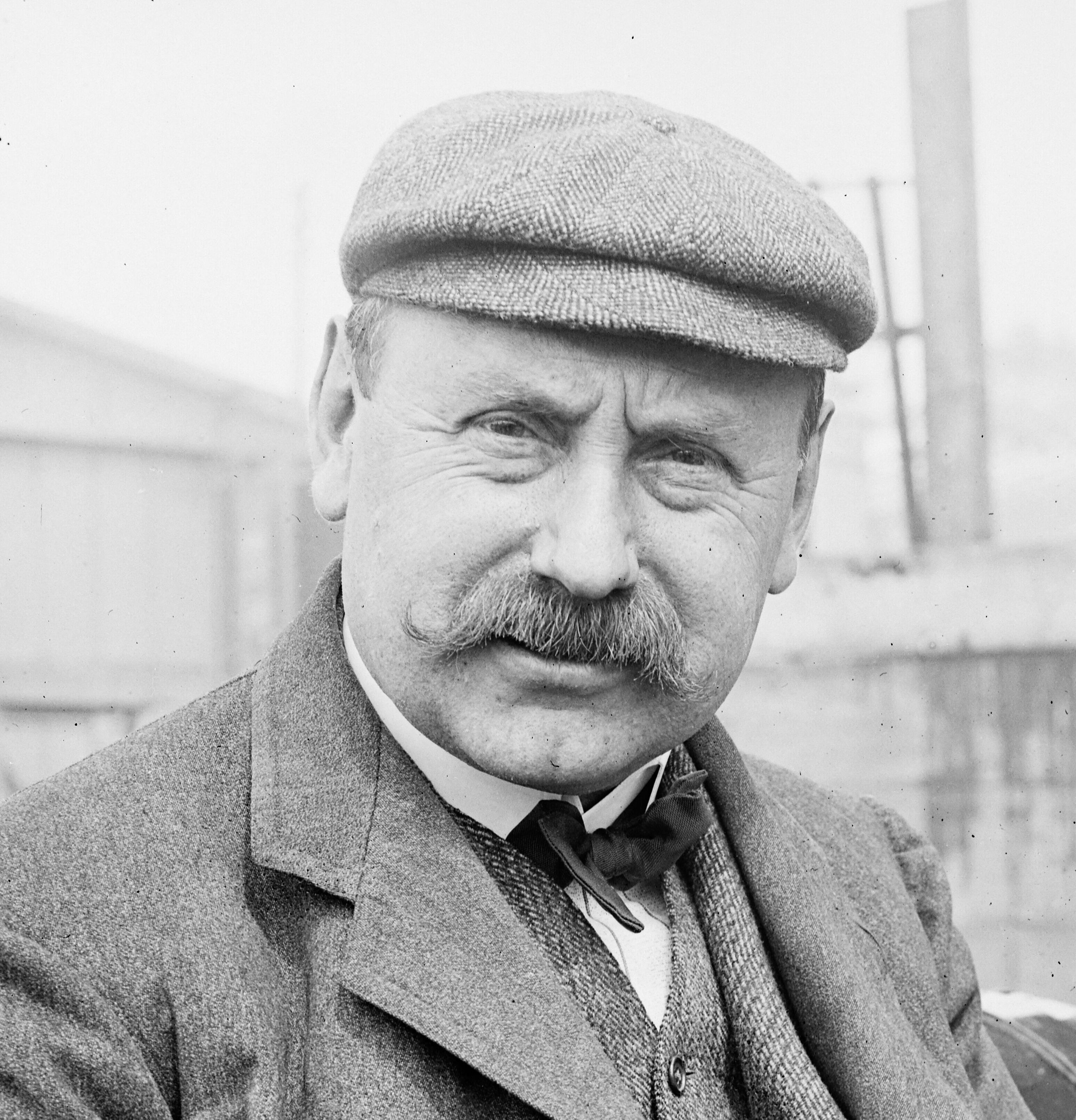

Léonce Girardot (French: [leɔ̃s ʒiʁaʁdo]; 30 April 1864 – 7 September 1922) was a French racing driver. He drove for Panhard & Levassor, the leading brand of this era and his strongest competitors were his teammates Fernand Charron and René de Knyff.

His first major race came in the 1897 season, when in the Paris-Dieppe race he took sixteenth place. Twenty-fourth place in the 1897 Paris-Trouville and the retirement from the first race in the next season 1898 Paris-Bourdeaux followed before Girardot finished in second place in the 1898 Paris–Amsterdam–Paris. He continued with the same result at the Tour de France for automobiles in 1899 and Paris-Lyon 1900. In 1901, he won the Gordon Bennett Trophy race, although he was the only one who finished from the field of three cars that entered. He finished in second place in the 1901 Paris-Berlin race.

In 1901, he founded the race car company Charron, Girardot et Voigt (C.G.V.) along with his teammates Charron and Émile Voigt. These cars proved unreliable, and it was only at the 1903 Ardennes race he finished, taking second position. After an accident in the French trials for 1905 Gordon Bennett Cup which he only just survived, he ended his racing career.

He patented an improved friction-clutch for motor cars in 1905, under US Patent number: 787031.

Léonce Girardot died in 1922.
