= Willy Pöge =

German racing driver (1869–1914)

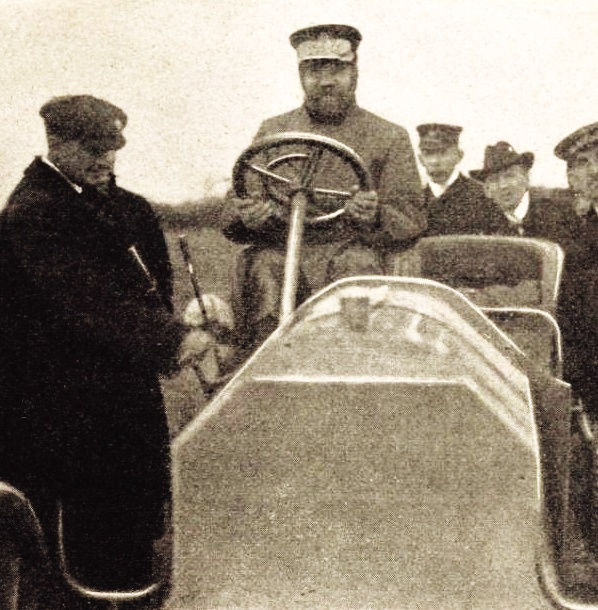
Willy sitting in a Mercedes in 1903, location is the hippodrome in Westend (Berlin).

(Friedrich Elias Willibald) Willy Pöge (2 December 1869 - 12 May 1914) was a German engineer and racing car driver.

He was born in Chemnitz, son of Hermann Pöge who encouraged him to study electrical engineering at the Chemnitz University of Technology in 1890. After the father’s death in 1894, Willy worked with Heinrich Goetz in the establishment of a workshop making dynamos and transformers. He also established activities in other cities such as Berlin, Dortmund, Dresden, Leipzig, Düsseldorf, Hamburg and Frankfurt/Main, as well as exports to France, Greece, the Netherlands, Romania, Russia and overseas. The company was after his death sold to AEG in 1930.

His fame however, is due to car racing. Racing for Chemnitzer Radsportveranstaltungen since 1889, he was Sachsenmeister in 1889 and achieved third in the German championship. Since 1903 he raced for Mercedes-Benz, winning with Christian Lautenschlager and Otto Salzer in the 1908 French Grand Prix. His last race was Tsar Nichols's Russian Touring Trial that same year, in which he triumphed. He next started flying until he died of a heart attack in 1914.
