= Henri Fournier =

French racing driver (1871–1919)

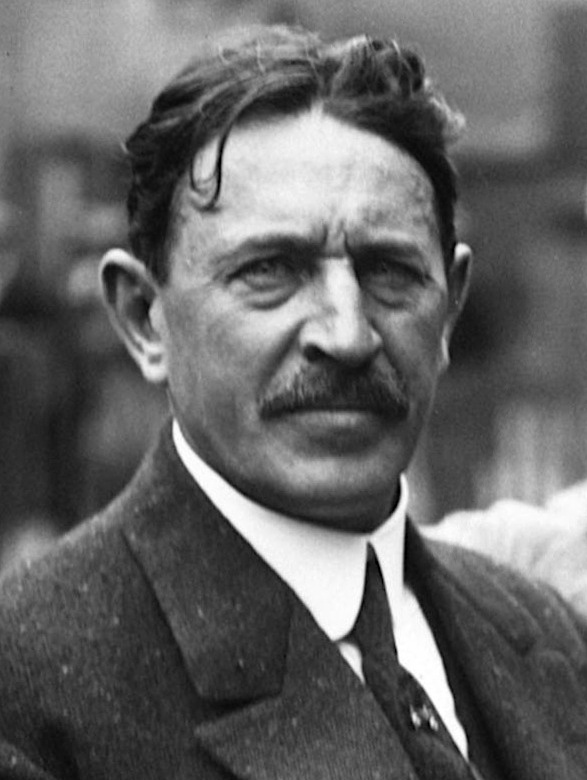
- Nationality: French
- Born: 14 April 1871 Le Mans, France
- Died: 18 December 1919 (aged 48)

Henri Fournier (14 April 1871, in Le Mans – 18 December 1919) was a French racing driver. Fournier began his career on motorcycles and tricycles. In 1901 he came to the Mors racing team and was the most successful driver of this year, as he won both the Paris–Bordeaux and Paris–Berlin races. In addition to his racing career, he did well in speed tests and in the United States set a new record for the mile with his car. At the 1902 Paris-Vienna race he also dominated the first leg with an average speed of 114 km/h, but later had to give up with transmission failure. In the autumn of that year he set the then land speed record at 123 km/h.

== Retirement and return ==
He then retired for the time being from motorsport to run a car dealership, for first Hotchkiss, then for the Italian marque Itala. With these he returned in 1907 to racing where in four races the best result achieved was eighth place in the 1908 American Grand Prize.

== Établissements Fournier ==
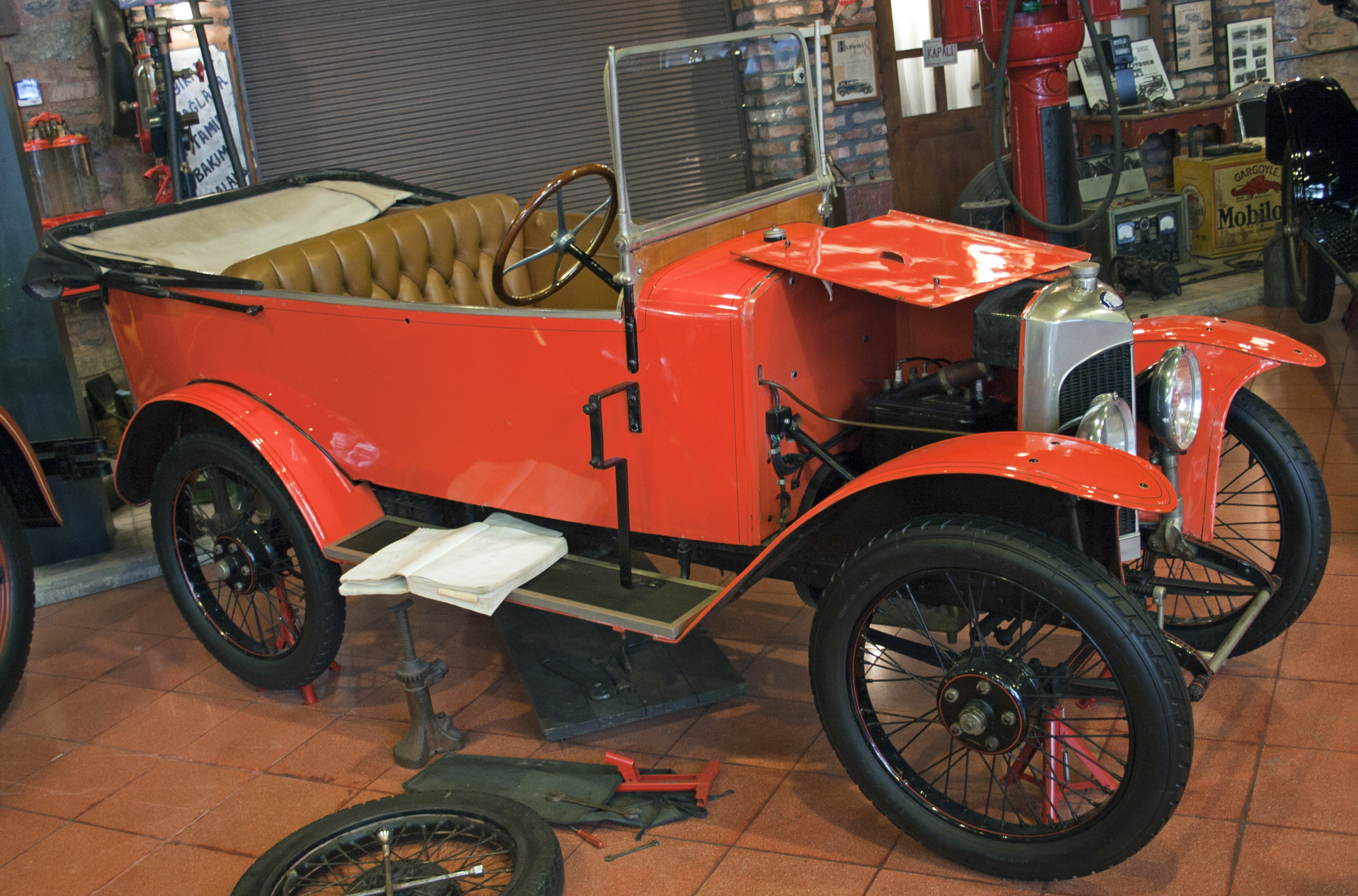
1919 Fournier "Baby Silvestre"

Together with his brother Achille, Fournier founded the company Établissements Fournier for manufacturing automobiles.
