= René de Knyff =

French car racing pioneer (1865–1909)

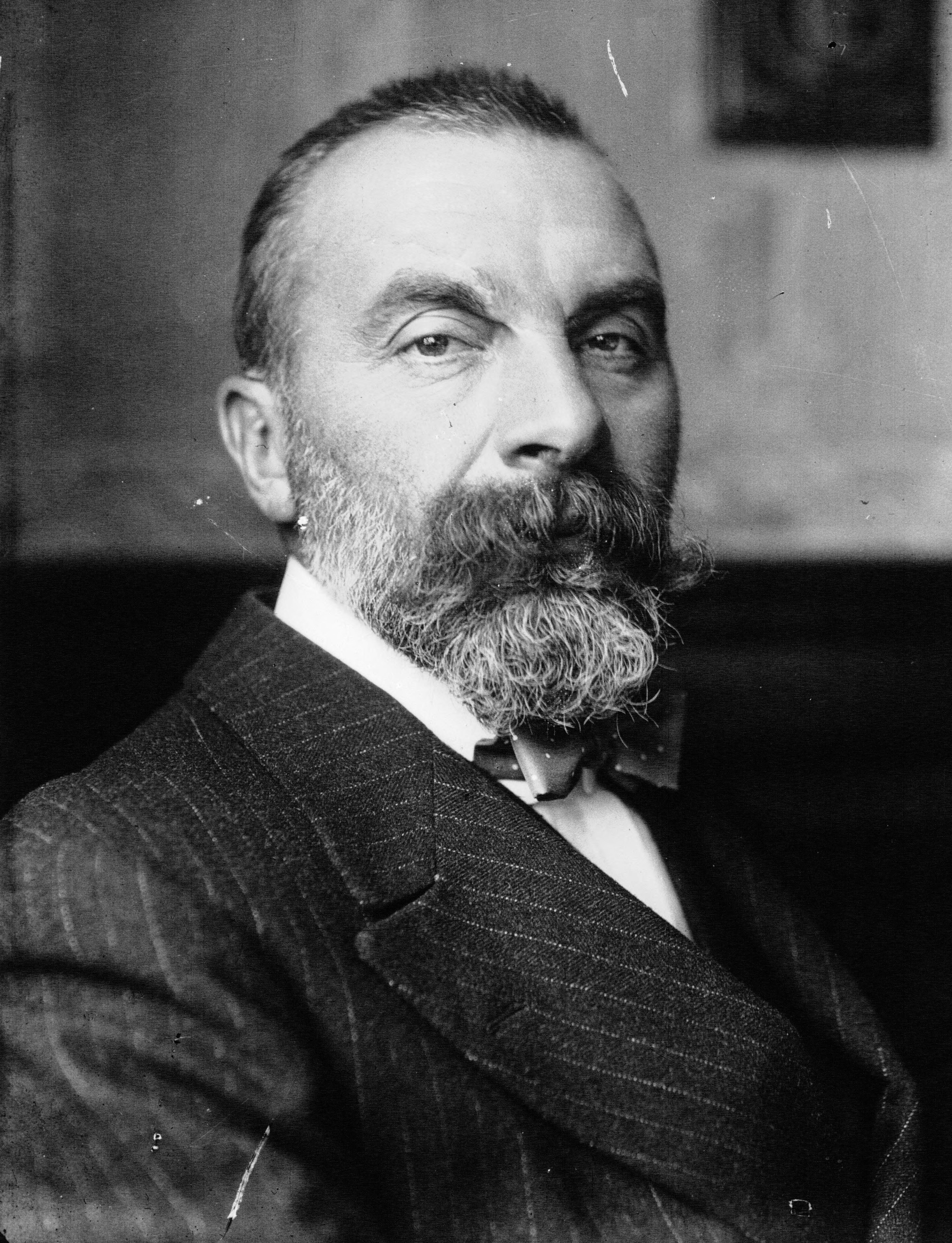
René de Knyff in 1912

Chevalier René de Knyff (December 10, 1865 in Antwerp, Belgium – 1954 in France) was a French pioneer of car racing and later a president of Commission Sportive Internationale (CSI), which evolved into the World Motor Sport Council of the FIA.

Between 1897 and 1903 he took part in 18 car races, 5 of which he won (Paris-Bordeaux 1898, Spa-Bastogne-Spa 1899, Tour de France 1899, Circuit du Sud-Ouest Pau 1900, and Nice-Marseille-Nice, 1900). He drove all the races in a Panhard & Levassor, wearing a captain cap which he always lost right after start. During his racing career, he was famous for his gentlemanship and sportsmanship. For example, during the Paris-Bordeaux race in 1895, he saw his great rival Fernand Charron who was sitting on the road next to his undependable car, tired and desperate. De Knyff stopped, asked Charron if he could help him somehow, gave him a glass of cognac and encouraged him to go on, which Charron did. He was a popular figure also due to his enormous beard, bohemian lifestyle (he knew where to get the best champagne, cigars and Rhine wine), and interest in many other sports, such as tennis, shooting, cycling, and also hunting. His cousin Gaëtan De Knyff (1871–1933) was also active in cycling and car racing.

== Honours ==
- 1881: Officier in the Order of Leopold.

Sporting positions
Preceded by none, position established	President of the Commission Sportive Internationale; 1922 - 1946	Succeeded by Augustin Perouse
