= Fernand Charron =

French cyclist (1866–1928)

Fernand Charron (30 May 1866, in Angers – 13 August 1928, in Maisons-Laffitte) was a French pioneer of motor racing and automobile manufacturing. He started his sporting career as a successful cyclist.

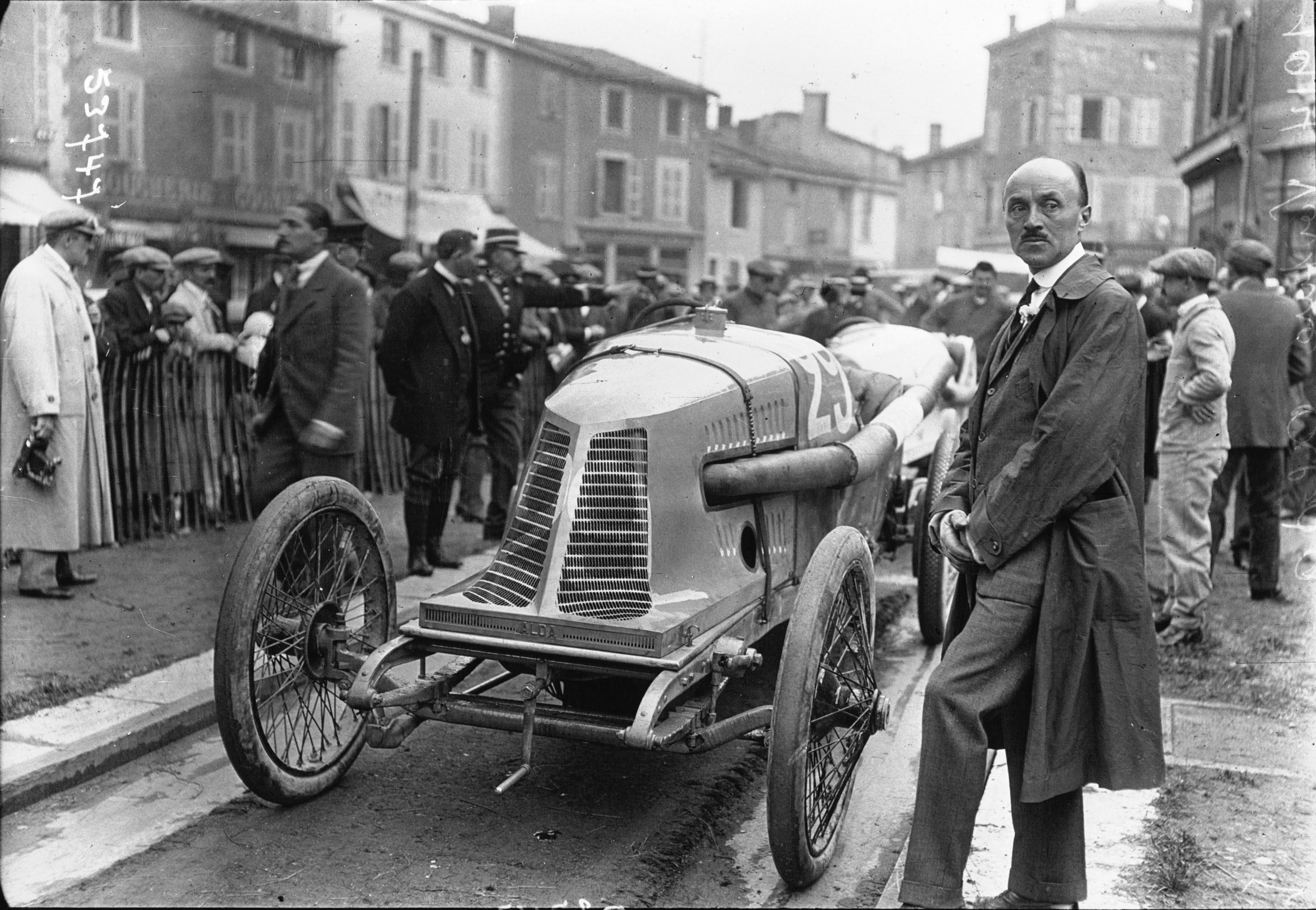
Fernand Charron at the 1914 French Grand Prix standing next to the Alda.

In 1891 he won the French National Stayers Championships riding a bicycle around a track following a tandem.

Between 1897 and 1903 he took part in 18 car races, 4 of which he won: Marseille–Nice and Paris–Amsterdam–Paris in 1898, Paris–Bordeaux in 1899, and the inaugural Gordon Bennett Cup (Paris–Lyon) in 1900. He drove mainly Panhard & Levassor cars.

On one occasion, he crashed into a St Bernard dog which became wedged between the right wheel and the suspension and jammed the steering, though he still won the race. He retired after an unsuccessful season in 1903 and worked as manager of Adolphe Clément's factory complex at Levallois-Perret.

In 1901, Charron was one of the three founders of an automobile manufacturer, Charron, Girardot et Voigt (CGV).

Davison Dalziel, bought the company, which took the trading name Charron Limited and whose head office was based in London at 32 Old Jewry, London · . Fernand Charron remained managing director until 1908.

Shortly before the outbreak of the First World War, Charron was trying to sell his auto business, but he nevertheless was also using it at this time to build cars for the Alda company. The arrival of peace in 1918 found Charron still owner of the business. At the Paris Motor Show in October 1919, it offered two models, the small 6HP "Type TC" (derived from the "Charronette" of 1914) and the 15HP "Type PGM".

Charron married in 1907, and later divorced in 1926, Jeanne Clément, the second daughter of cycle and motor manufacturer Adolphe Clément.
