= Eugène Train =

French architect

- Born: 1832; Toul, Meurthe-et-Moselle, France
- Died: 1903 (aged 70–71); Annecy, Haute-Savoie, France
- Occupation: Architect

Eugène Train (1832–1903) was a French architect who taught for many years at the École des Arts Décoratifs. He is known as an advocate of rationalist architecture, which he applied with large schools such as the Lycée Chaptal and Lycée Voltaire.

== Early years ==
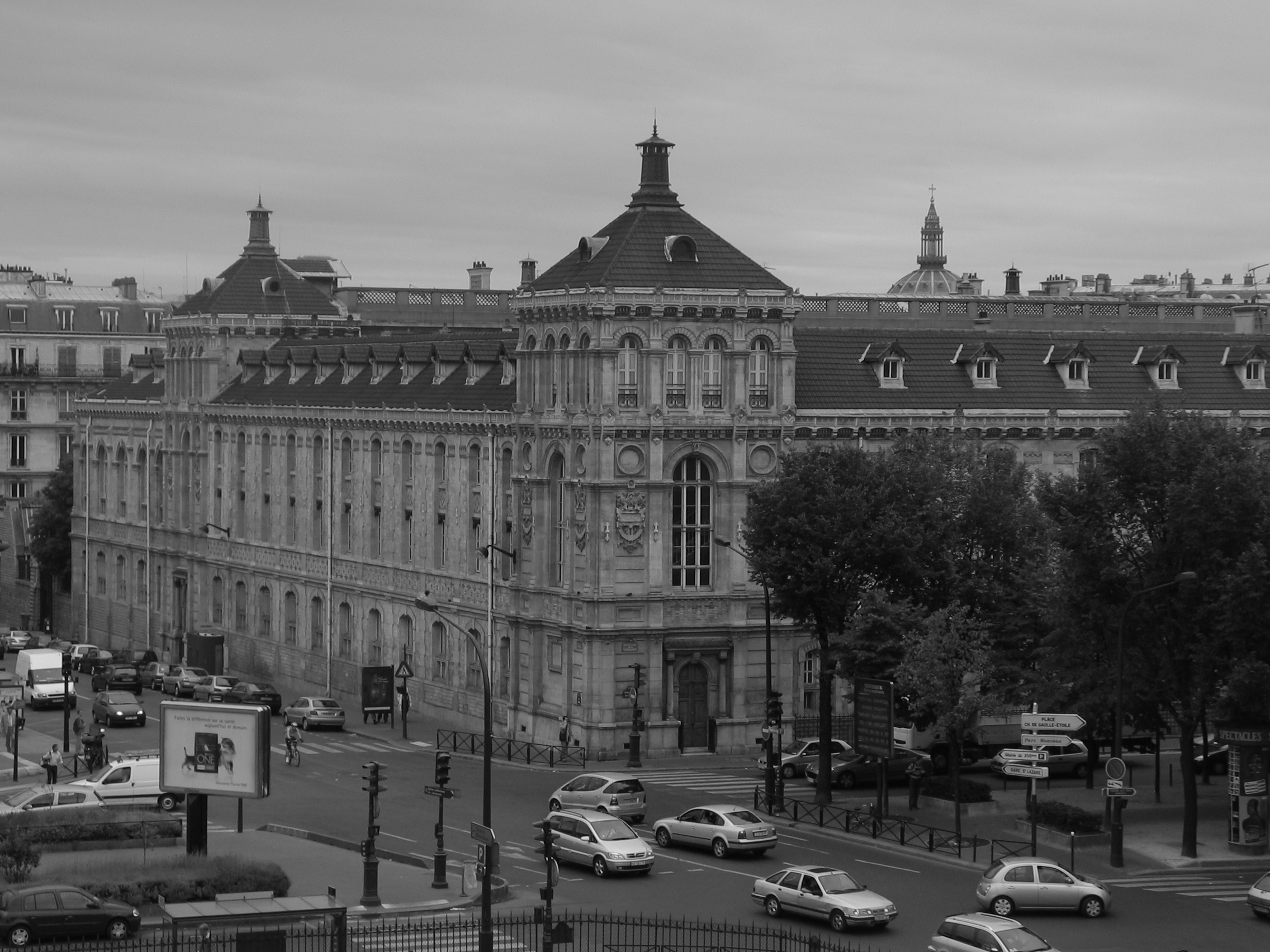
Lycée Chaptal, Train's best-known work

Eugène Train was born in 1832 in Toul, Meurthe-et-Moselle. He was admitted to the École des Arts Décoratifs in 1850, and studied under Adolphe-Marie-François Jaÿ. In 1852 he moved to the École des Beaux-Arts, where he studied under Charles-Auguste Questel. Eugène Train received the second Prix de Rome in 1859. He became one of the leaders of the rationalist school of French architecture, particularly with his educational buildings. (Note: The rationalist principles were based on the ideas of Eugène Viollet-le-Duc, who rejected the concept of an ideal architecture and instead saw architecture as a rational construction approach defined by the materials and purpose of the structure.)

== Teacher ==
Train became a tutor at the École des Arts Décoratifs in 1855, and taught there until 1899. He was a director of the school between 1870 and 1899. (Note: The École des Arts Décoratifs was founded by Jean-Jacques Bachelier in 1767 as the École Royale Gratuite de Dessin. It changed name several times. In 1863 it was called the Petite École.) Train was a demanding teacher. He constantly complained about the lack of education of his pupils, who were required only to be able to read and write. In 1874 he proposed that, at least for the architecture course, there should be an entrance examination in geometry. This was resisted by Laurent-Jan, who did not want any obstacles to admission to his school. Train also asked in 1874 whether the school could teach students the basic principles of fabrication and coloration so they could design carpets, wall hangings and stained-glass windows. This represented a new departure for the school, which had avoided specialized training until then.

== Architect ==
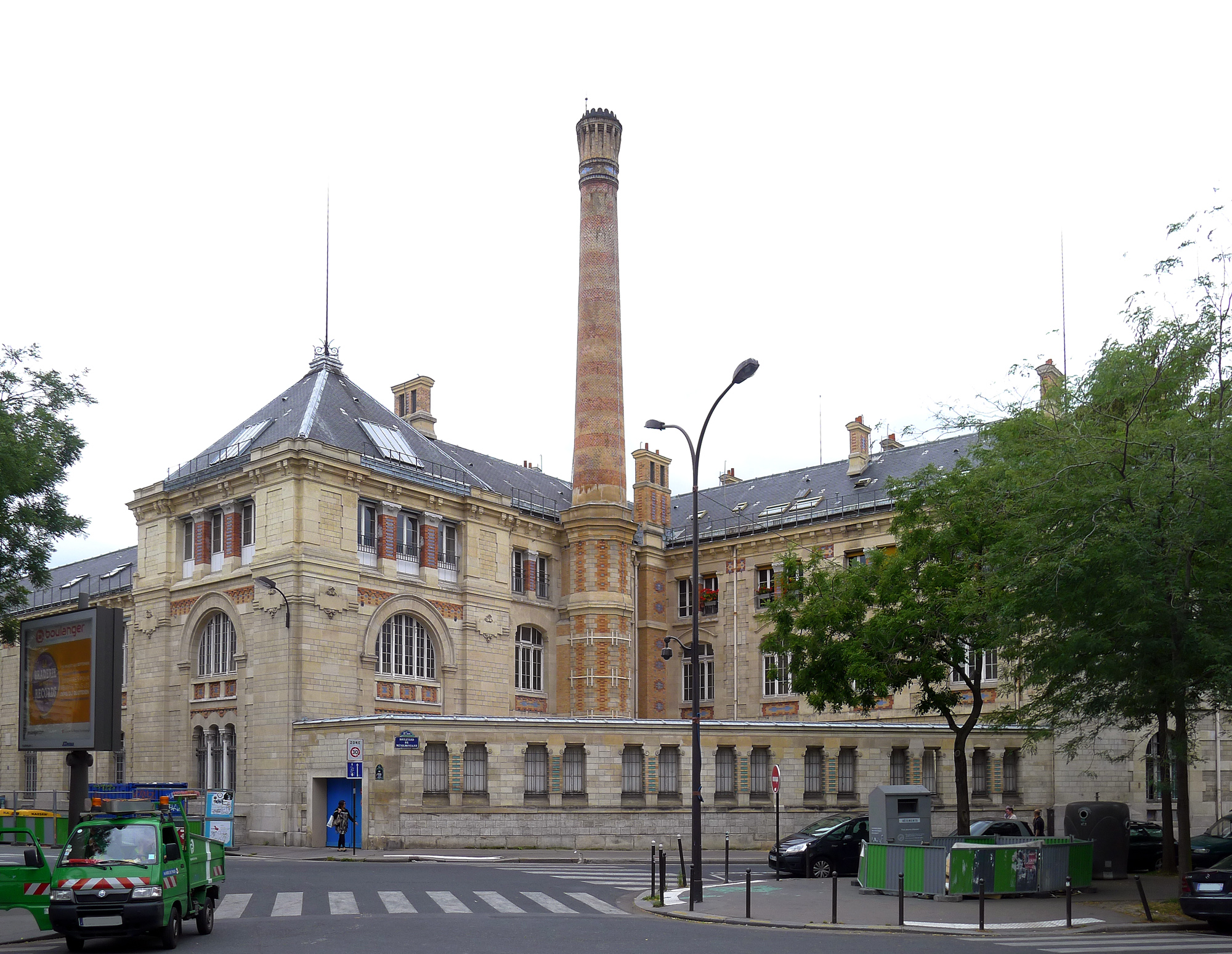
Lycée Voltaire

Train became an architect of the city of Paris in 1863. Between 1863 and 1876 he designed and oversaw construction of the new Lycée Chaptal. The original premises of the school were irregular in plan and too cramped for the student body. Train was selected to build the new school following specifications defined by the city. Construction started in 1866, but was interrupted by the Franco-Prussian War of 1870. Work resumed in 1871 and was completed in 1876. Train was architect of the Lycée Voltaire on the Avenue de la République. Construction began in 1885. The school accommodated 1,200 pupils, of whom 500 were boarders. The decorations of the building included metal and ceramics.

Eugène Train was made a knight of the Legion of Honour. He died in Annecy in 1903 at the age of 71.

== Students ==
- Eugène Millet (1819–1879)
- Charles-Louis Genuys (1852–1928)
- Gustave Rives (1858–1926).
- Joseph Hornecker (1873–1942)
- Édouard Stanislas Louis Le Monnier (1873-1931)

== Sources ==
- Ballon, Frédéric; Wittman, Richard (Spring–Summer 1996). "Teaching the Decorative Arts in the Nineteenth Century: The École Gratuite de Dessin, Paris". Studies in the Decorative Arts. 3 (2). University of Chicago Press on behalf of the Bard Graduate Center: 77–106. doi:10.1086/studdecoarts.3.2.40662569. JSTOR 40662569. S2CID 191395023.
- Bradel, Vincent (1989). "Mais qui est donc Joseph Hornecker ?". Architecture moderne en province (in French). Editions Parenthèses. ISBN 978-2-86364-824-7.
- Dictionnaire par noms d'architectes des constructions élevées à Paris aux XIXe et XXe siècles 1876-1899. Vol. IV. Paris. 1996.
- "Eugène Train". Structurae (in French).
- Froissart-Pezone, Rossella; Wittman, Richard (1999–2000). "The École Nationale des Arts Décoratifs in Paris Adapts to Meet the Twentieth Century". Studies in the Decorative Arts. 7 (1). University of Chicago Press on behalf of the Bard Graduate Center: 2–32. doi:10.1086/studdecoarts.7.1.40662721. JSTOR 40662721. S2CID 193108671.
- Gazette des beaux-arts (1903). La Chronique des arts et de la curiosité. Bureaux de la Gazette des beaux-arts.
- Labrouste, Henri; Bélier, Corinne; Bergdoll, Barry; Marc Le Cœur; Martin Bressani (2013). Henri Labrouste: Structure Brought to Light. The Museum of Modern Art. ISBN 978-0-87070-839-8.
- Le Baron, Yves (1998). "Faits historiques" (in French). Lycée Chaptal.
- Letter from Paris (1889). The Builder.
- Société de l'histoire de l'art français (2002). Bulletin de la Société de l'histoire de l'art français. F. de Nobele.
