= Camille du Gast =

French racing driver (1868–1942)

Camille du Gast Camille Crespin du Gast
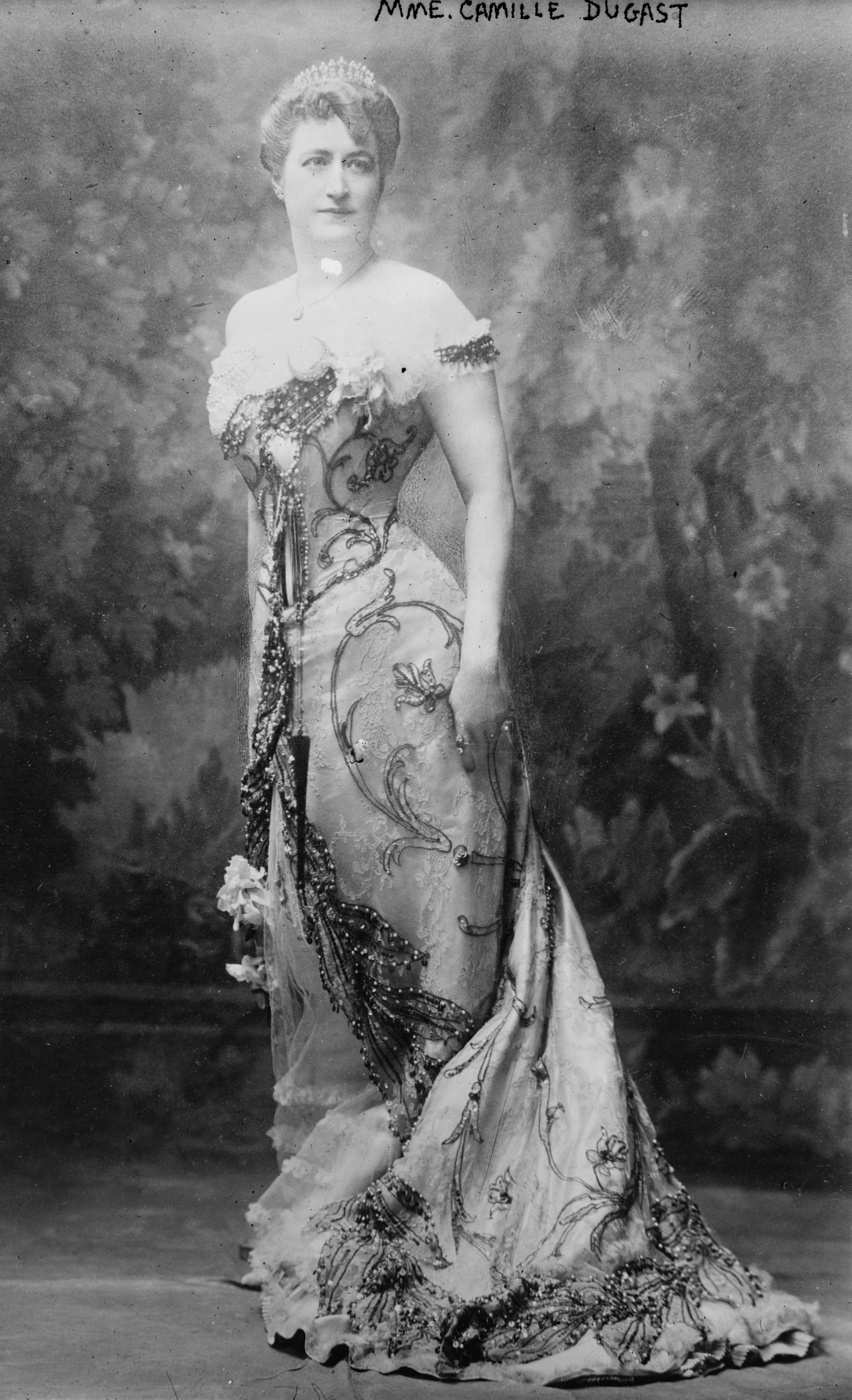
- Camille du Gast – c. 1900 publicity photograph for a piano recital.
- Born: 30 May 1868; Paris, France
- Died: 24 April 1942 (aged 73); Paris, France
- Other names: l'Amazone la Walkyrie de la Mécanique
- Occupations: one of the richest and most accomplished widows in France; Sports woman, balloonist, parachutist, motorist, motor-boatist Charity worker, animal welfare worker Made surveys of Morocco for French Government; Vice-president of the Ligue Française du Droit des Femmes; Only woman official of the Automobile Club de France (A.C.F.); President of the 'Société protectrice des animaux' (SPA)
- Known for: Second woman to compete in a 'motor race' International motor-boat racer Concert pianist and singer charitable enterprise for orphans and disadvantaged women crossing Morocco on horse-back accused of being La Femme au Masque

Camille du Gast (Marie Marthe Camille Desinge du Gast, Camille Crespin du Gast, 30 May 1868 – 24 April 1942) was one of a trio of pioneering French female motoring celebrities of the Belle Époque, together with Hélène de Rothschild (Baroness Hélène van Zuylen) and Anne de Rochechouart de Mortemart, the Duchess of Uzès. (Note: Anne de Rochechouart de Mortemart, Duchess of Uzès, along with Camille du Gast was the first women to hold driving licenses in 1897, and alone was the first woman to be ticketed for speeding in 1898 (15 km/h instead of 12 km/h), and the first woman 'lieutenant de louveterie' (Wolfcatcher Royal) in 1923. She was one of the first clients of Émile Delahaye, a pioneer of the automobile industry. In 1899 she became the first woman to receive a speeding ticket. She had driven at 15 kilometres per hour (9.3 mph) in the Bois de Boulogne where the speed limit was 12 kilometres per hour (7.5 mph). She was president of the Aeroclub Ladies' Committee and President of the Women's Automobile Club (1927).)

Du Gast was known as one of the richest and most accomplished widows in France due to her many achievements. She was an accomplished sportswoman—a balloonist, parachute jumper, fencer, tobogganist, skier, rifle and pistol shot, horse trainer—as well as a concert pianist and singer. She was the second woman to compete in an international motor race.

In France, she later became renowned for her extensive charity work. She was president of the Société protectrice des animaux (Society for the Prevention of Cruelty to Animals, SPA) until her death, and her campaign against bullfighting included disruptive direct action protests. She provided health-care to disadvantaged women and children in Paris, and continued whilst under German occupation in World War II.

She was the central figure in the Parisian scandal of La Femme au Masque where she was maliciously but mistakenly named as the nude model in a notorious painting by Henri Gervex. This salacious story involved three court cases, and was reported around the world.

Her exuberant social and sporting lifestyle was changed by a traumatic experience around 1910, when her daughter attempted to have her murdered in order to inherit her wealth. Afterwards she devoted herself to French government work in Morocco, and charitable works with animals, disadvantaged women and orphans.

A pioneer feminist, she served as vice-president of the Ligue Française du Droit des Femmes (The French League for the Rights of Women) after World War I. In 1904 she became the only woman official of the Automobile Club de France (A.C.F.).

She was known in the press by the sobriquets l'Amazone and la Walkyrie de la Mécanique (Valkyrie of the motor car).

== Personal life ==
Marie Marthe Camille Desinge du Gast was born in Paris in 1868. A 'garçon manqué' (tomboy) she was the youngest amongst her siblings, having a sister plus a brother who was twelve years older.

Known as Camille du Gast she married Jules Crespin in 1890, he was the manager and majority shareholder of the Grands Magasins Dufayel, one of the largest department stores in France. It had evolved from Le Palais de la Nouveauté which his father Jacques Crespin had founded in 1856 in the 18th arrondissement of Paris, but by 1890 Georges Dufayel had taken over ownership of the store and changed its name to Dufayel. Jules Crespin died young (circa 1896/7, 'when she was 27') leaving her a very wealthy widow with a young daughter. This further stimulated her to participate in sporting activities. Some sources report that she had originally started competitive ballooning and parachuting activities under her maiden name, du Gast, at her husband's behest in order to avoid them being mistaken for publicity stunts.

She was an accomplished athlete, fencer, tobogganist, skier, rifle and pistol shot, horse trainer and concert pianist. Gordon Bennett described her as "the greatest sportswoman of all time".

After her husband's death she began to travel extensively, including crossing Morocco on horseback. She was active on the Parisian social scene, being known as "one of the richest and most accomplished widows in France".

=== Character ===
Her quixotic character, pugnacity, ambition and daring meant that she was both admired and detested in equal measure. She developed her political connections whilst rubbing shoulders with political leaders and personalities.

=== Attempted murder ===
Around 1910 her daughter attempted to have her murdered in her home in the middle of the night. Jean François Bouzanquet wrote in his book Fast Ladies: Female Racing Drivers 1888 to 1970 :

It was her daughter who put an end to this adventurous life. A jealous and mercenary individual, she had been trying for a long time to extort money from her famous mother. By the skin of her teeth, Camille escaped an assassination attempt, instigated by her daughter's ruffian friends, at her home in the middle of the night. She confronted them and they turned tail and fled. Faced with a daughter who had deceived her, nothing was ever the same for Camille after that, and from that point until her death in Paris in April 1942 she devoted herself to her beloved animals.

=== Death and commemoration ===
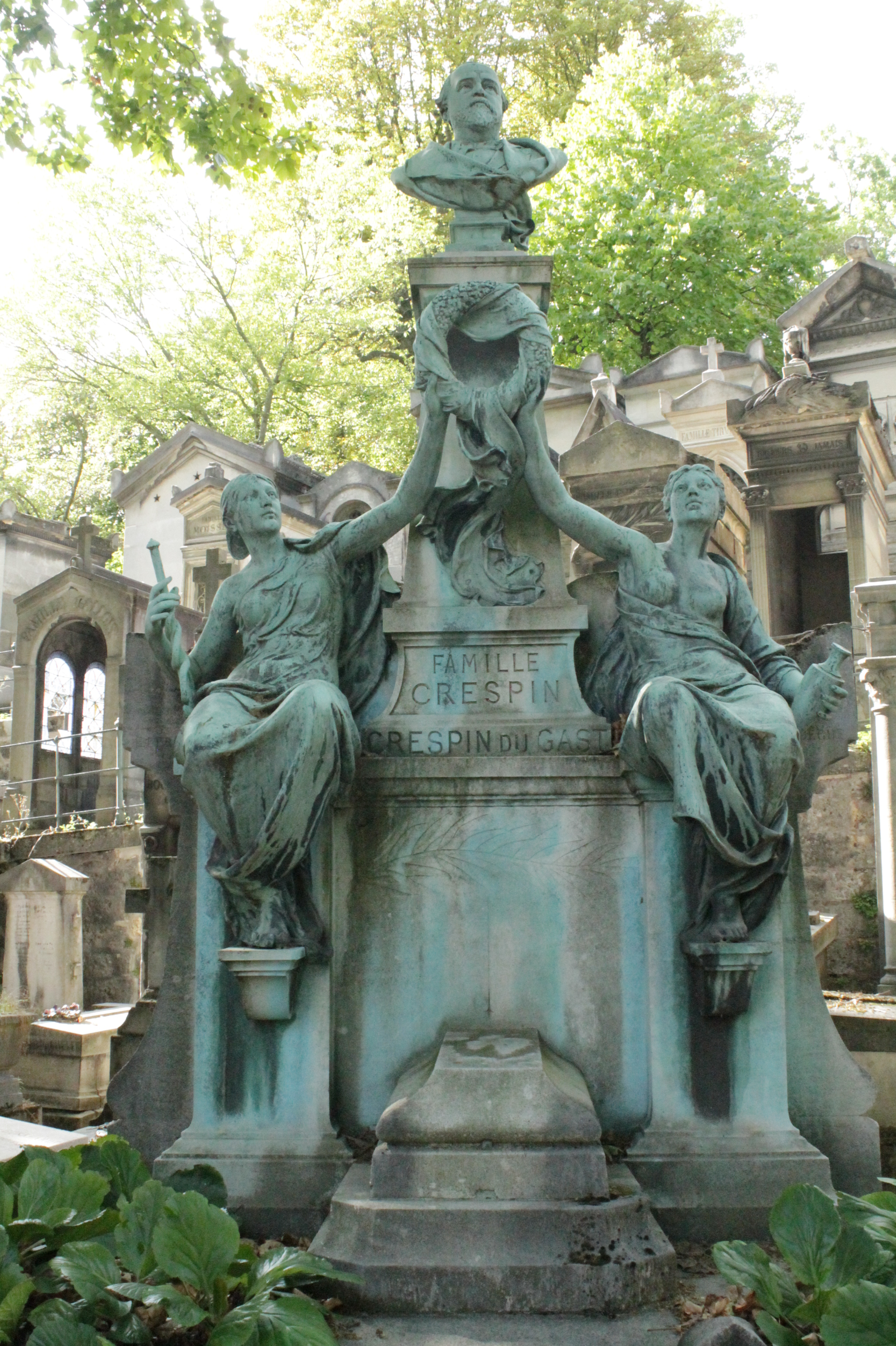
The grave of the Crespin du Gast family, Pere Lachaise Cemetery, Paris

She is buried in the Crespin family tomb at the Père Lachaise Cemetery in Paris. The sepulchre in the 36th section of the cemetery is adorned with a bust of the founder Jacques Crespin, and decorative statuary by sculptors Jules Dalou, Alexandre Falguière and Étienne Leroux (1836–1906).

In 1929 she was honoured when the government named the rue Crespin du Gast in the Paris district of Ménilmontant, a name that is still preserved today. Her international fame was highlighted when, on 27 December 1929 the Roundup Record Tribune & Winnett Times of Roundup and Winnett, Montana reported -

Paris – Madam du Gast, once known as the most beautiful woman in Paris and certainly one of the most beneficent, has just been honoured by having her name added to the rue Crespin which will henceforth be known as the rue Crespin du Gast. It is one of the very few streets in Paris named for women, for, what with all the generals, marshals, presidents and city councilors and mayors ready for honours, the women come in for very few.

She is also commemorated by the technical school 'Lycée professionnel des métiers de l'automobile Camille du Gast' at Chalon-sur-Saône

== La Femme au Masque ==
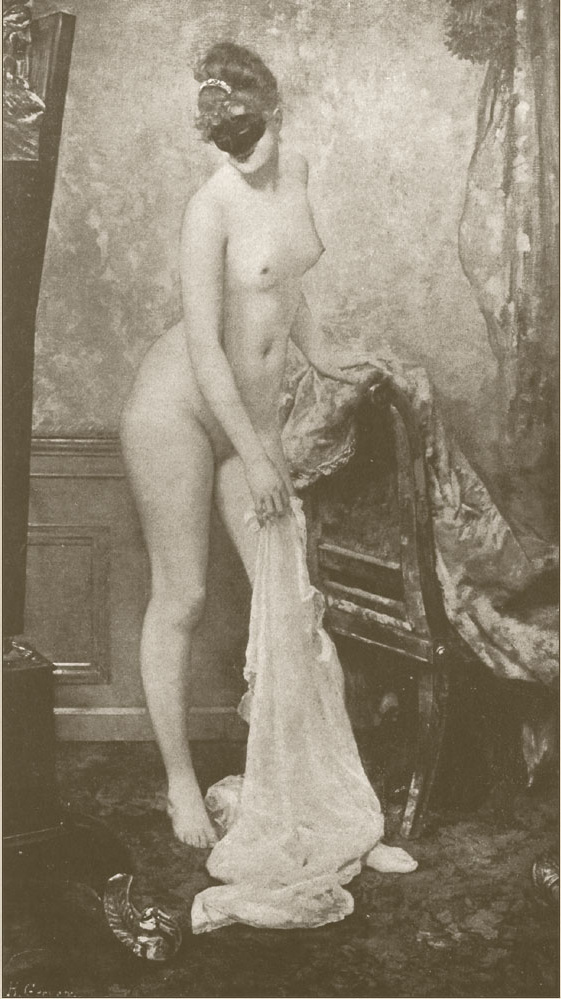
La Femme au Masque by Henri Gervex 1885 – Parisienne mannequin Marie Renard wearing a Domino mask

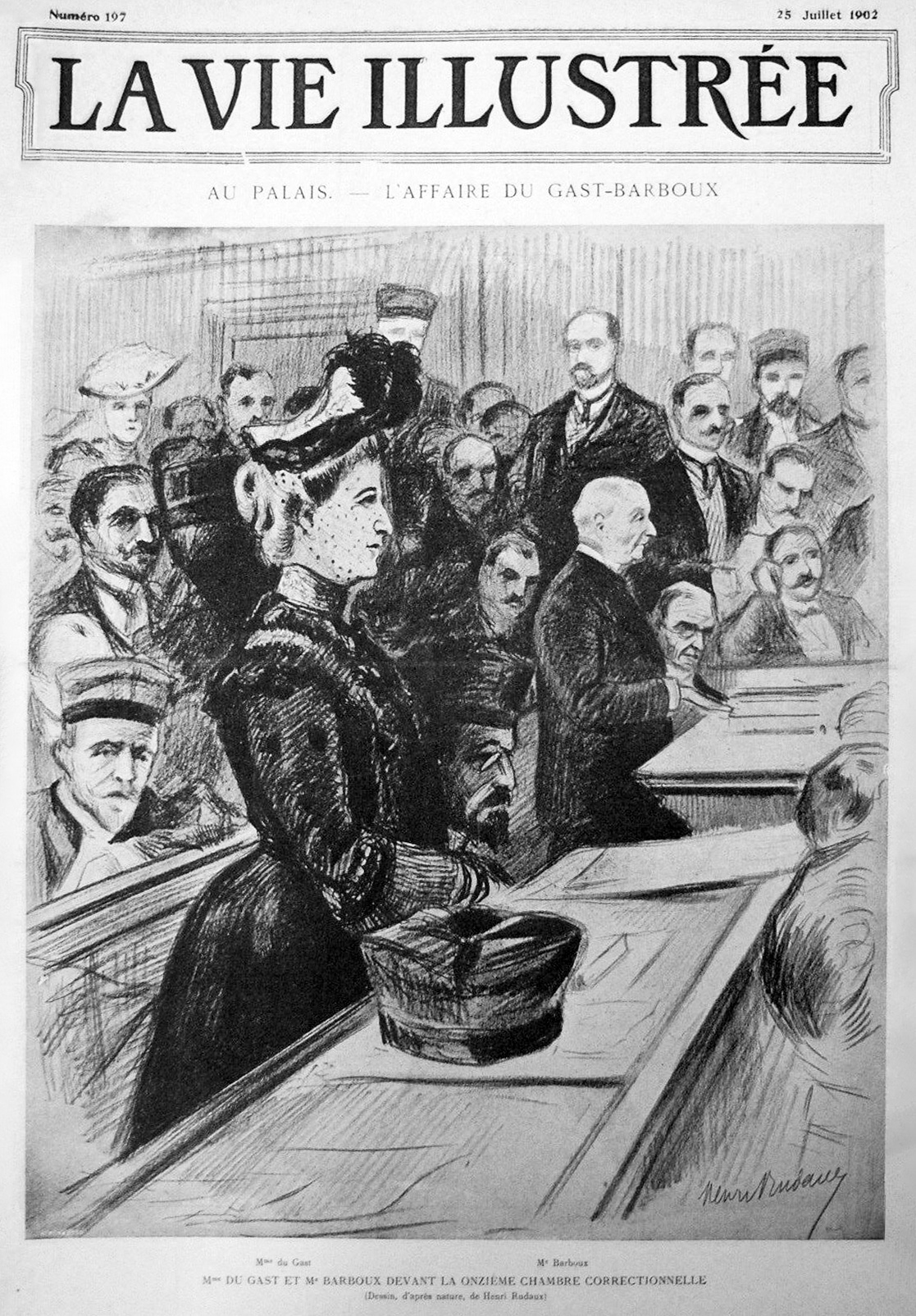
Front page of the newspaper La Vie Illustrée, that was published on 25 July 1902, depicting Mme Camille du Gast, standing in court for the prosecution of her case of character defamation against the barrister Maitre Barboux

La Femme au Masque affair involved Madame du Gast in three discrete court cases in Paris in 1902, with its salacious and colourful detail being reported worldwide. In 1885 Henri Gervex painted La Femme au Masque (The Masked Model), a notorious picture of his 22-year-old model Marie Renard standing naked apart from a Domino mask concealing her face. Her identity was never publicly revealed, causing great speculation and many accusations over time.

In 1902, during hostile family legal proceedings Maître Barboux, the barrister representing her father and brother, accused du Gast of having posed for the picture, and he handed a photograph around the court. She retaliated by bringing a legal action against Barboux, but even though both Henri Gervex and Marie Renard appeared for her, she lost, possibly because Barboux's character assassination was considered 'normal practice' in France. After Barboux left the court he was confronted by M. de Marcilly and Hélie de Talleyrand-Périgord, the Prince de Sagan, her close friend, admirer and suitor, who punched him in the face (or gave him two slaps) and called him 'an insulter'. In September 1902 both of the men who had championed du Gast in this fashion were prosecuted at the 'Palais de Justice', the Prince was fined 500 francs and de Marcilly 100 francs. The ongoing scandal was newsworthy around the world, being reported in detail in New Zealand and Australia, the West Gippsland Gazette waxing lyrical about her exotic appearance, demeanour, achievements and intellect.

== Ballooning and parachuting ==
Madame du Gast and her husband were enthusiastic hot air balloonists, and she flew with the semi-professional pilot Louis Capazza. In 1895 she jumped from a hot air balloon at an elevation of 610 metres (2,000 ft) using a parachute. The balloon was one of two used to publicise her husband's department store, Dufayel, at fêtes and public events, but he insisted that she use her maiden name, du Gast, to avoid her endeavour appearing as a publicity stunt.

== Motoring ==
Du Gast was enthused by watching the start of the 1900 Gordon Bennett Cup race from Paris to Lyon. By 1901 she owned both a Peugeot and a Panhard et Levassor motor-car, stimulating her interest in driving and racing. She is reported as one of the first women, after the Duchess of Uzès, to obtain a driving license. Such was her drive and pugnacity and daring, she managed to become the only woman official of the Automobile Club de France (A.C.F.) on 1 December 1904.(Source: Official Journal of the A.C.F)

=== 1901 Paris–Berlin ===
In 1901 du Gast and Baroness Hélène van Zuylen, wife of the President of the Automobile Club de France (A.C.F.), were the only two woman entrants in the Paris–Berlin race. The baroness Zuylen had already competed in the 1898 Paris–Amsterdam–Paris, so du Gast became the second woman to take part in an international motor race. Du Gast was accompanied by Hélie de Talleyrand-Périgord, the Prince du Sagan as her riding mechanic. The race was run in three legs – 27 June Paris–Aachen 459 kilometres (285 mi); 28 June Aachen-Hanover 447 kilometres (278 mi); 29 June Hanover-Berlin 299 kilometres (186 mi). Her 20 hp Panhard was under-powered and not designed for racing, hence she started last of 122 entrants but she finished 33rd overall in a total time of 25 hours 30 minutes 23 seconds (19th in the 'Heavy class'), and determined to do better next time. The Baroness Hélène Zuylen stopped with technical problems on the first day, so du Gast received the plaudits for her successful finish.

=== 1902 ===
In 1902 du Gast competed in the Paris to Vienna race. She also applied to enter the New York to San Francisco race but was refused by the governing body because she was a woman. Other racing activities were precluded when she took an extended cruise.

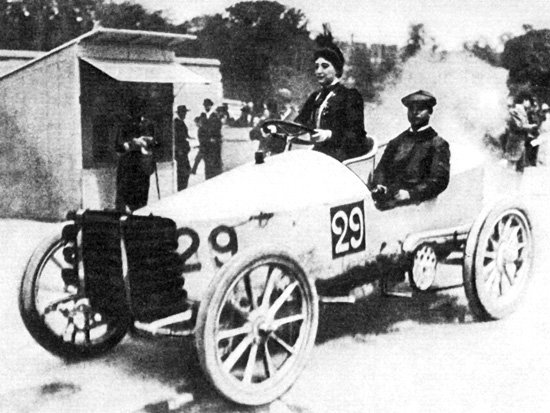
Paris–Madrid 1903 – Camille du Gast pilots her 30 hp De Dietrich, with starting number 29. Her upright seating position has been ascribed to the corsetry that the fashion of the time demanded.

=== 1903 Paris–Madrid ===
For the 1903 Paris–Madrid race du Gast was engaged by Adrien de Turckheim to drive one of his works 5.7-litre 30 hp De Dietrichs. Although she was popular with the French public, the hostility to female drivers was exemplified by the comment about her in The Autocar: "The gallant Frenchmen applauded and raised their hats, but for ourselves we must confess to a feeling of doubt as to whether fierce long-distance racing is quite the thing for ladies."

The Race of Death involved fatal accidents for two drivers plus six or more spectators (the total number of fatalities has never been recorded) such that it was stopped at Bordeaux by the French government and the vehicles towed by horses to the railway station. Du Gast started in 29th position and gained 9 places in the first 120 kilometres (75 mi). She had risen to 8th before she stopped near Libourne just outside Bordeaux to give first aid to her fellow De Dietrich driver, Englishman Phil Stead, who was trapped under his car when it rolled into a ditch. She nursed him until an ambulance arrived and was credited by doctors with probably saving his life. She restarted and reached Bordeaux in 77th place when the race was stopped.

=== 1904 ===
In 1904 the Benz factory team offered du Gast a race seat for the Gordon Bennett Cup because of her performance in the 1903 Paris–Madrid, but by then the French government had barred women from competing in motorsport, citing 'feminine nervousness'. In April 1904 her protest letter was published in L'Auto, but to no avail as it was not her skill that was in doubt, instead it was the worsening political attitude to road racing resulting from the Paris–Madrid Race of Death.

=== 1905 ===
In July 1905 Madame du Gast competed at the inaugural Brighton Speed Trials where she drove a 35 hp car in the handicap event but lost to Dorothy Levitt who drove her 80 hp Napier to set the Ladies World Speed record.

== Motor-boating ==
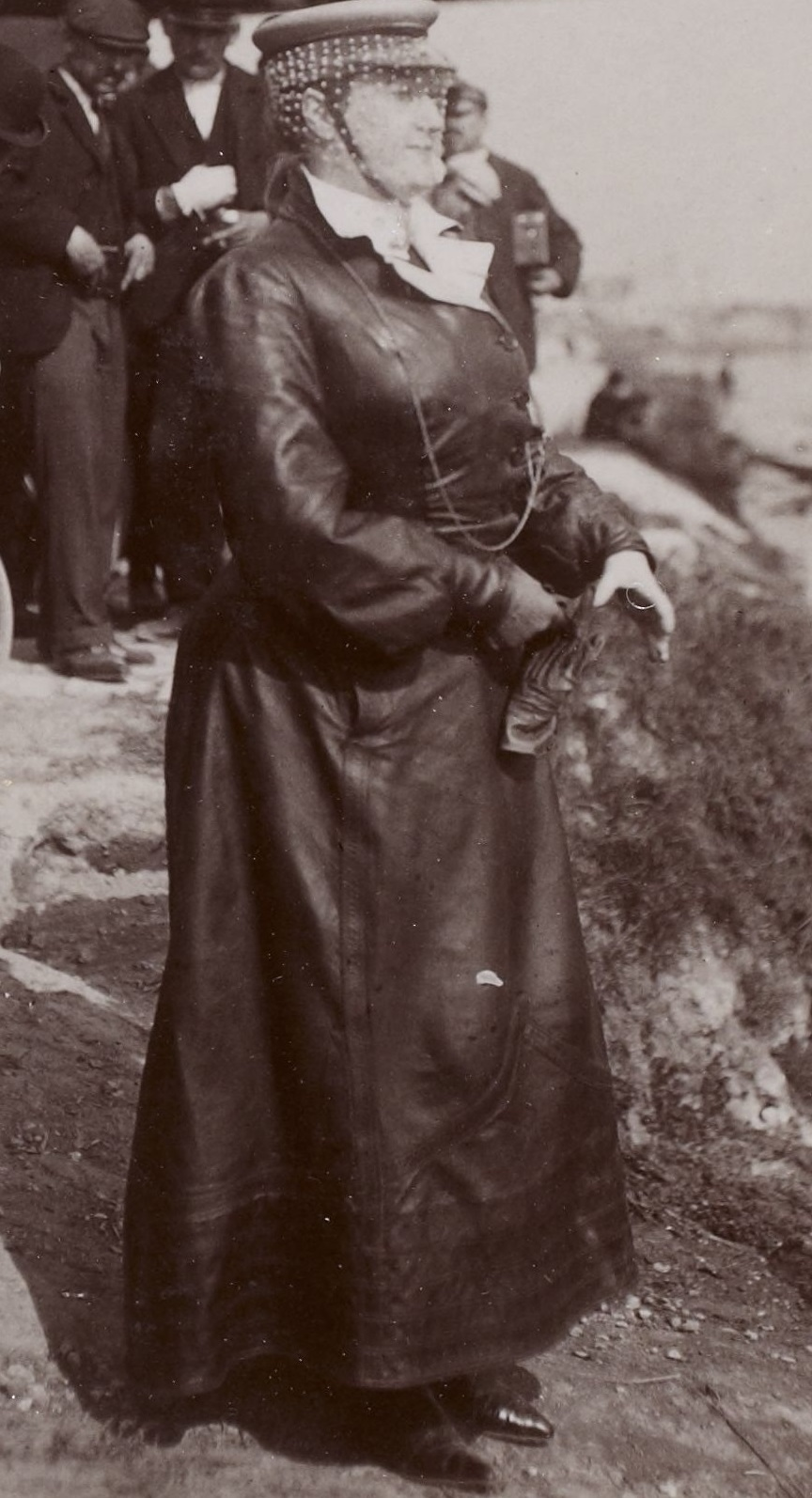
Camille du Gast at Juvisy. 1904

The 1904 French government ban on women in motor racing forced du Gast to take up motor-boat racing. The launch industry in France was hardly more than five years old, but it had become the new vogue sport, growing at speed that rivalled that of motoring in the 1890s. The poor image caused by the Paris–Madrid event in 1903 meant that the events scheduled in the nautical calendar [for 1905] exceed in number and importance those planned for the road, and they are attracting quite as much public attention.

In September 1904 du Gast piloted the Darracq powered Marsoin on the river Seine at Juvisy-sur-Orge, on the outskirts of Paris. According to the press report she carried it off with some gallantry, attracting attention for her elegant hat, gloves, veil and full length coat.

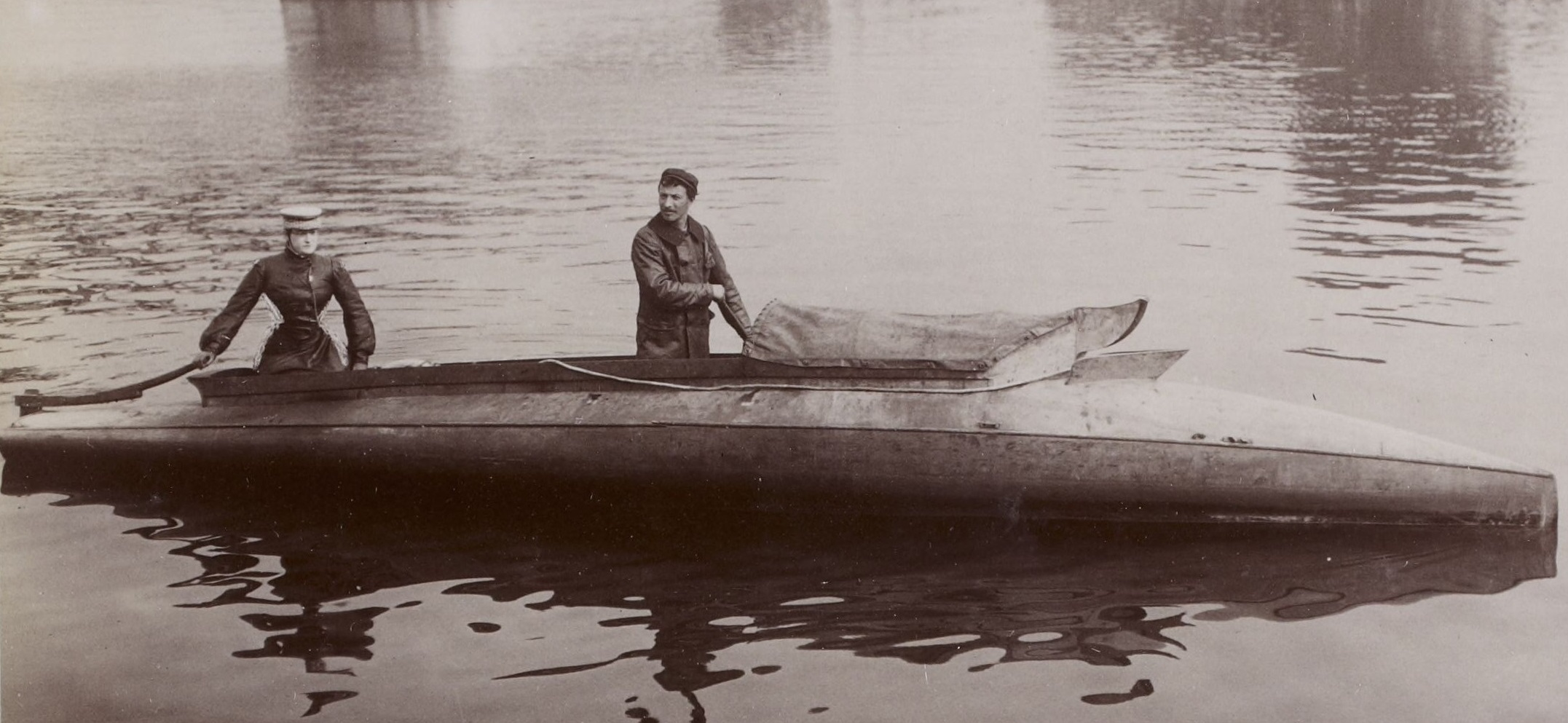
("Camille du Gast testing the Darraq motor boat of Mr Caillois at Juvisy", 1904).

In May 1905 The Rudder reported that :

The first event of the season, the Monaco meeting, from 2 to 16 April, ... is without precedent [for quantity of entrants] in yachting history; beginning with an exhibition of all types of motor-boats, lasting four days, after which three days afloat were allowed for preparations, the races began on 9 April and continued for the following week.

Du Gast competed in her boat La Turquoise, a 'Tellier fils & Gérard' hull fitted with a 6-cylinder Panhard motor of 150 horse-power. She entered the 100 kilometres race for racers in the eight to 12 metres classes but 'did not finish'. The event was won by S. F. Edge in his Napier II in 1 hour 5 minutes. Edge also finished second in Napier 1 as it was common practice to describe the owner and entrant as the driver, even if he did not take the wheel.

=== Algiers to Toulon ===
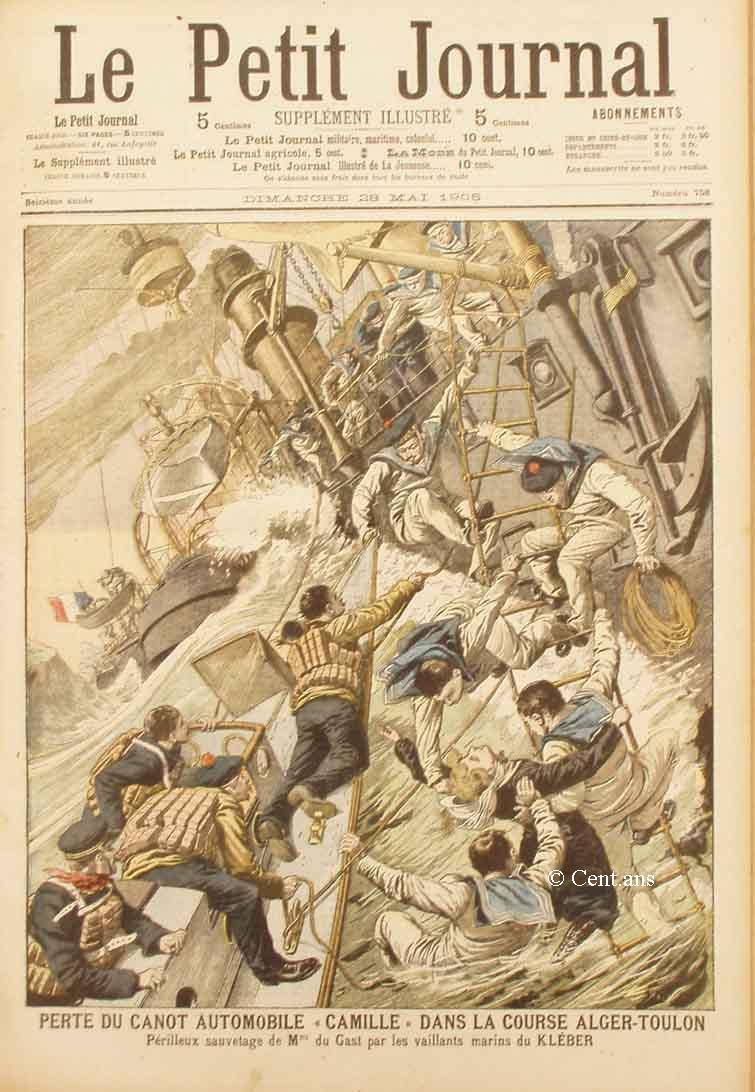
Front page of Le Petit Journal, 28 May 1905, – Camille du Gast – Sauvetage dans la course Alger Toulon (Rescue on the Algiers – Toulon race).

In May she competed in the trans-Mediterranean race from Algiers to Toulon, having commissioned the 13 metres (43 ft) steel-hulled Camille specifically for the event and fitted a 90 horse power Charron, Girardot et Voigt (C.G.V.) engine. A violent storm during the second stage from Mahón, Menorca, to Toulon, put all seven boats out of action and sank six of them including the Camille. Two months later du Gast was eventually declared the winner, having come closest to finishing before sinking.

The Algiers-Toulon race was organized by the Paris newspaper Le Matin, sponsored by Mercedes Paris and supported by the French Minister of Marine who provided both a prize and 'torpedo destroyers' to accompany each of the seven competitors. This encouraged the construction of especially heavy racing boats adapted for the open sea – from 9.1 metres (30 ft) to 24 metres (79 ft) feet in length, and 35–200 horse-power. The Camille had a 13 metres (43 ft) steel hull, a 90 horse power Charron, Girardot et Voigt (C.G.V.) engine, and was built by the Pitre Company in Paris.

The fleet departed Algiers at 6 am on 7 May, firstly the Quand-Même, then at short intervals the Mercedes C. P., the Mercedes-Mercedes, the Fiat, the Camille, the Malgré Tout, and the Héraclès II accompanied by the naval ships Kléber and Desaix. The Fiat took 12 hours to reach Mahón on Menorca, 195 nautical miles (224 miles (360 km)), while the Camille arrived second at 10 pm, taking 16 hours for the trip.

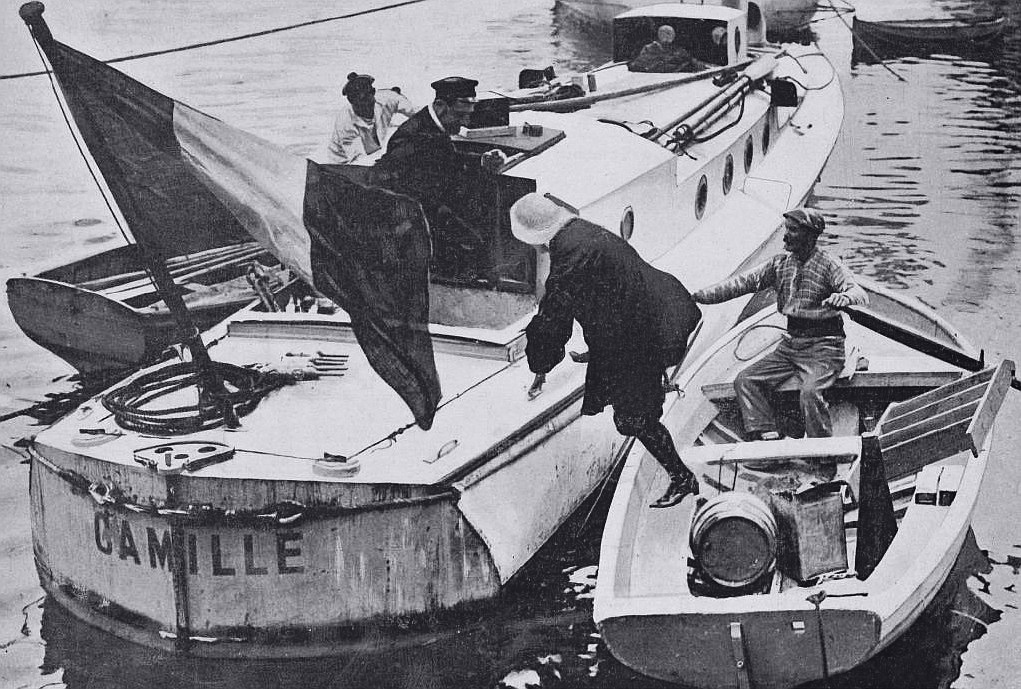
Camille du Gast aboard the "Camille" (May 1905, Algiers-Toulon).

Preparations were then made to leave Mahon on the second leg, but bad weather forced them to remain in the port until 13 May. They set off at 4 a.m. but the sea became rougher and after only 45 minutes the Fiat was hauled aboard the battle ship La Hire. Later the Mercedes C. P., the Héraclès II, the Malgré Tout, and the Mercedes-Mercedes each abandoned and were taken in tow. At 10 a.m. the breeze stiffened, but the Camille and the Quand-Même were still making good headway. At 5 pm the Camille had to be taken in tow by the battleship Kléber but broke away, thus du Gast and the crew had to be rescued before she sank. All boats apart from the Fiat were taken in tow, swamped and sank . Two months later, after much official wrangling, du Gast was declared the winner, having come closest to finishing before sinking.

The New York Times on 21 May reported that: "Mme. Du Gast ... has sent 10,000f to the sailor who jumped into the sea from the cruiser Kléber and rescued her during the storm that scattered the racing boats."

== Travel and government work ==
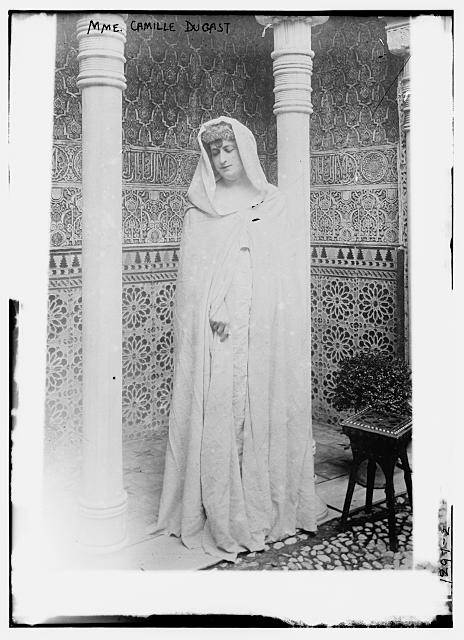
Camille du Gast in Morocco, a journey which she described in Ce que m'a dit le Rogui, published in Je sais tout in 1909

After her husband's death she began to travel extensively. In September 1906 she decided to explore Morocco on horseback. She documented this experience in her article Ce que m'a dit le Rogui, (What the Rogui said to me.) published in Je sais tout in 1909. She described her unconventional modes of travel, alone in dangerous areas, and stated that she

"adventured alone to Morocco, that country infested with brigands, [and] full of dangers for Europeans and especially for the French."

In both 1910 and 1912 she was commissioned by the French government to visit Morocco, firstly on behalf of the Ministry of Foreign Affairs and latterly on behalf of the Ministry of Agriculture. Laura Godsoe observed in her study Exploring their Boundaries: Gender and Citizenship in Women's Travel Writing, 1880–1914 that du Gast worked with local women handing out medicines and candy in the tiniest hamlets. She endeavoured to help the French government gain influence and demonstrate the benefits of French rule. She noted that 'after eleven months of travel she felt she had improved the image of France, the key to this task being; "a nice horse, a calm demeanor, authority and generosity."

[Du Gast stated that she] would try to the best of my ability, to continue this useful enterprise and to succeed finally in spreading across Morocco the influence of our country.

Du Gast attended the Algeciras Conference of 1906, whence the women's journal La Vie heureuse (Femina) noted that "It is not useless to hope that there, where the diplomats have not been able to succeed, the diplomacy of a woman might be able to."

== Publishing ==
du Gast published several articles about her sporting achievements, including:

- A deux doigts de la mort (On the Brink of Death), in the journal Je sais tout of 15 February 1905 described the disastrous motor-boat race from Algiers to Toulon where she capsized (or sank) but was declared the winner.
- Ce que m'a dit le Rogui (What the Rogui said to me. (Rogui – a pretender to the throne of Morocco)), published in Je sais tout in 1909, chronicled her journey through Morocco on horseback.
- She published several travel narratives in the women's journal La Vie heureuse (today known as Femina), where she regarded herself as an "exploratrice".
- She wrote the preface to Gustave Dumaine's 1933 book Contes pour mon Chien (Stories for my Dog).

== Charity work ==
Madame du Gast was known in France for her extensive charity work.

=== Animal welfare ===
After the trauma of her attempted assassination by her daughter in 1910 she steadily became more devoted to animal welfare. She worked at the Paris refuge for stray and injured dogs that was founded in 1903 by Gordon Bennett. She served as president of the 'French Society for the Prevention of Cruelty to Animals' (SPA) from 1910 until her death in 1942. In 1927 she used her own funds to modernize and enlarge the animal shelter at Gennevilliers.

She campaigned against bullfighting, which was illegal but 'administratively tolerated' in France. The campaigning included organising a mass protest at Place de la Concorde in Paris, and on 29 May 1930 she organised a demonstration in Melun against a bullfight that had been organised as a 'fund raiser' for local schools. After the paseo, the formal entrance march of bullfighters into the arena, Du Gast gave the signal for thirty young people, including two girls, to jump into the arena blowing whistles. They were followed by 400 demonstrators and smoke bombs. The police were called to evacuate the arena.

=== Women's welfare ===
Du Gast also worked with disadvantaged women and children, establishing centers for orphans and impoverished women. She continued to provide health-care to disadvantaged women and children in German-occupied Paris, until her death in 1942.

== Feminism ==
Madame du Gast was a feminist concerned with advancing the rights and emancipation of women, a frequent traveler, and a devoted Republican. She became vice-president of the Ligue Française du Droit des Femmes (The French League for the Rights of Women) after World War I. Her pre-eminence and The Role of Sports in the feminist victory is discussed in the book Cinquante-ans de féminisme : 1870–1920 published by the French League for Women's rights in 1921.
