= John-Étienne Chaponnière =

Swiss sculptor

John-Étienne Chaponnière

Jean-Élie Chaponnière (French: [dʒɔn etjɛn ʃapɔnjɛʁ]; 11 July 1801 – 19 June 1835), also known as John-Étienne Chaponnière and Jean-Étienne Chaponnière, was a Swiss sculptor active in Italy and France.

== Early life and education ==
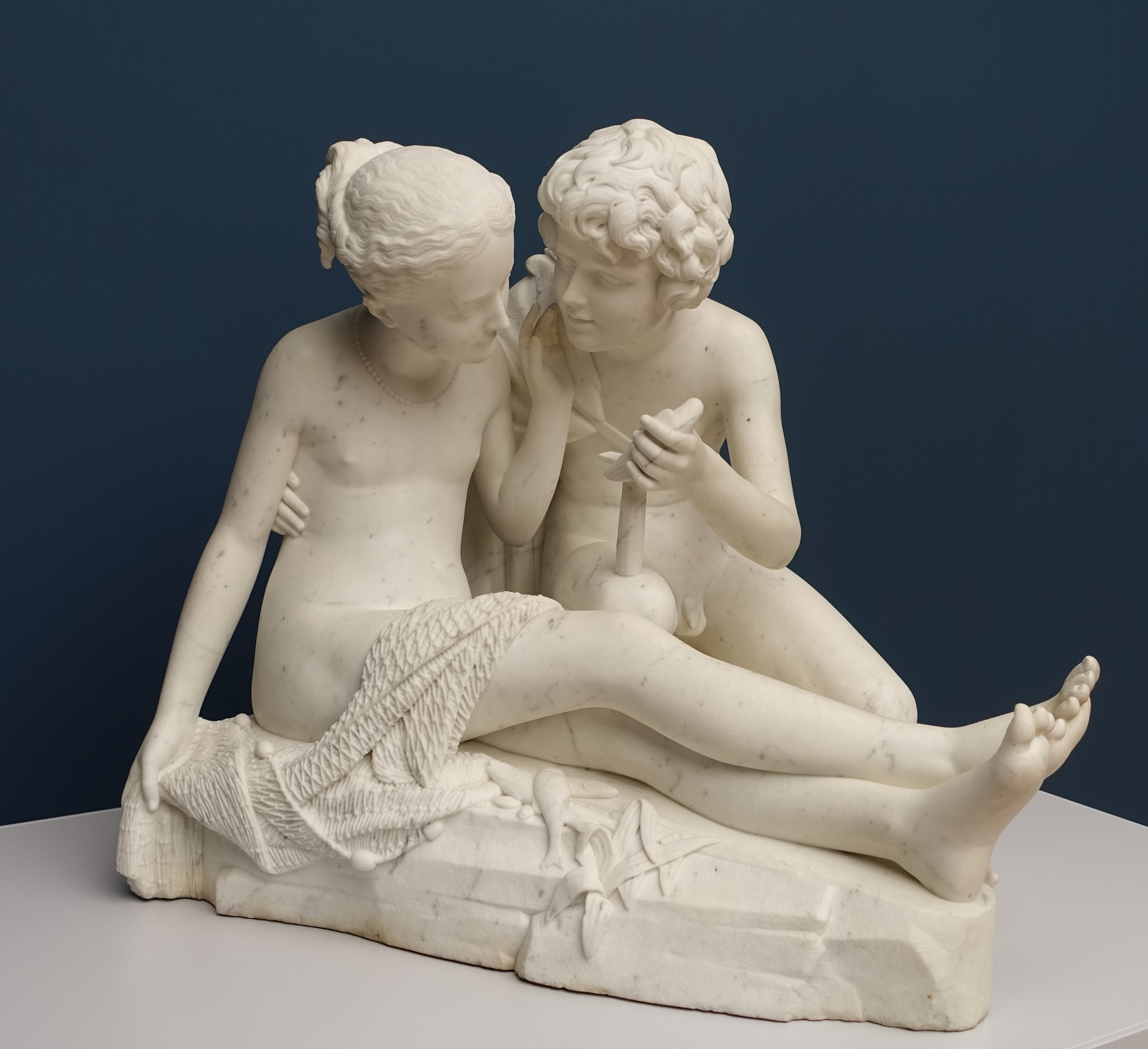
Daphnis and Chloe by John-Étienne Chaponnière

Chaponnière was born in Geneva, where he studied at the school of the Société des Arts under Joseph Collart and Charles Wielandy. He moved to Paris in 1822, where he studied first at the École Gratuite de Dessin and then under sculptor James Pradier, who advised him to abandon painting for sculpture.

== Career ==
After a period in Naples from 1827 to 1829, Chaponnière moved to Florence where he lived with Lorenzo Bartolini, and then onwards to Rome. In 1827 he created his first major piece, la Jeune captive pleurant sur le tombeau de Byron, which he sold to the Musée Rath in Geneva. It was sufficiently well-received that he was made an honorary member of the Société des Arts. His subsequent works, including the Son of William Tell, an allegorical bas-relief for the bust of Marc-Auguste Pictet, and a Hunting and Fishing Group (later renamed Daphnis and Chloe), were also successful in Geneva in 1829. After a brief time in Switzerland, he returned to Paris, where his Daphnis and Chloe proved successful enough in 1831 that Adolphe Thiers commissioned a bas-relief of the taking of Alexandria for the Arc de Triomphe (which was subsequently shown in the Salon of 1834). Chaponnière retitled his Jeune captive figure as Une captive de Missolonghi, under which title it was exhibited in the Salon of 1833. His 1834 David and Goliath was also a success, and was in 1854 cast in bronze for Geneva's promenade des Bastions.

== Death ==
In rapidly declining health, Chaponnière died in 1835 at Monnetier-Mornex (Haute-Savoie), near Geneva.
