= La Semeuse de Paris =

French consumer credit company

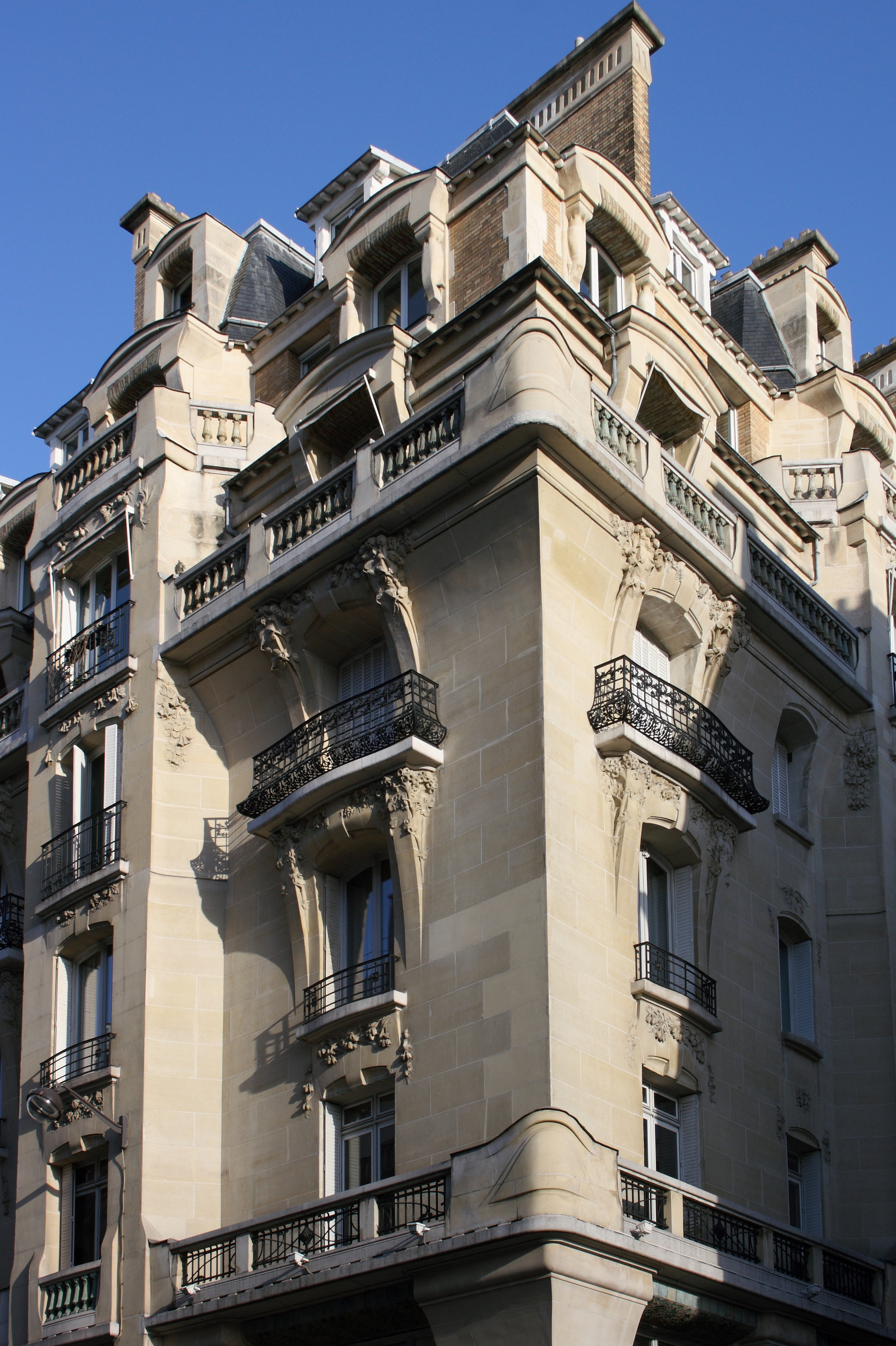
- La Semeuse building in 2011
- Industry: Consumer credit
- Founded: 1913; 113 years ago
- Headquarters: Paris, France
- Area served: Paris
- Products: Department store coupons paid by instalment
- Owner: La Samaritaine

La Semeuse de Paris was a French consumer credit company owned by the La Samaritaine department store in Paris. It sold coupons to working class consumers, who paid in installments. They could spend the coupons at La Samaritaine or other stores. The Art Deco building that housed the company is now a historical monument. Founded in 1913 by former employees of Georges Dufayel, the company's coupons were eventually replaced by the Sofinco credit card.

== History ==
=== Foundation ===
Georges Dufayel developed a system of buying vouchers through installment payments, which could then be spent in stores that accepted the vouchers. Dufayel owned the retail chain Grands Magasins Dufayel that accepted his vouchers, and they were also accepted by independent stores. These included La Samaritaine, which doubled its sales in one year after introducing credit. La Semeuse was created in 1913 by some of Dufayel's former employees, with a similar credit model. The motto was "Capital must work; workers must have [capital]".

Door-to-door salespeople sold coupons to working class consumers. After making a small down-payment, the buyer could buy goods with the coupon, paying the rest later. They could also wait until they had paid for the coupon before using it, treating it as a form of savings account. The founders were praised by l'Humanité as "syndicalists and revolutionaries".

=== La Samaritaine ownership ===
La Semeuse won the La Samaritaine account. Dufayel tried to block the move. When that failed he entered into direct competition with La Samaritaine in selling clothing. Soon after La Samaritaine bought La Semeuse.

The form of consumer credit provided by La Semeuse, Provident and others spread in France in the interwar period, in competition with credit arrangements offered by unions of retailers and with consumer finance companies backed by car and appliance manufacturers.

The company did well, and by 1929 three hundred retailers were accepting its coupons. Consumers in France in 1949 could buy appliances on credit from La Semeuse, and also from Gaz de France and the CAF. By 1953 La Semeuse had outstanding consumer sales loans of 5 billion old francs.

Eventually the La Semeuse coupons were replaced by the Sofinco credit card. Sofinco was founded in 1951 by the Fédération nationale de l'ameublement (National Furniture Federation). In 2000 it became a wholly owned subsidiary of Crédit Agricole.

== Building ==
The "La Semeuse" building was constructed between 1910 and 1912 at 14–16, rue du Louvre in the 1st arrondissement. The building also contained apartments. The architect was Frantz Jourdain and it was built by Ernest Cognacq. It has an Art Nouveau decor.

The elongated forms and protrusions are typical of the modern style. The elevator and its cage have largely preserved the original style, with windows designed by Francis Jourdain, the son of Franz Jourdain.

As of 11 December 2000 the facades, roofs and public areas were listed on the inventory of historical monuments. It was also listed as a 20th-century heritage building.

== Sources ==
- "Découvrir Sofinco". Sofinco.
- "Immeuble (Siège de la Semeuse de Paris)". Merimée. Ministry of Culture.
- "La Semeuse". PSS.
- Logemann, Jan (2012-07-17). The Development of Consumer Credit in Global Perspective: Business, Regulation, and Culture. Palgrave Macmillan. ISBN 978-1-137-06207-9.
- Milo, Max (2005-10-13). Dealer légal. ISBN 978-2-315-00341-9.
- Platat, Stéphanie (2005-06-15). "Les Samaritain(e)s".
- Pulju, Rebecca (2011-02-14). Women and Mass Consumer Society in Postwar France. Cambridge University Press. ISBN 978-1-107-00135-0.
- Trumbull, Gunnar (2014-08-11). Consumer Lending in France and America: Credit and Welfare. Cambridge University Press. ISBN 978-1-107-01565-4.
