= Gustave Rives =

French architect

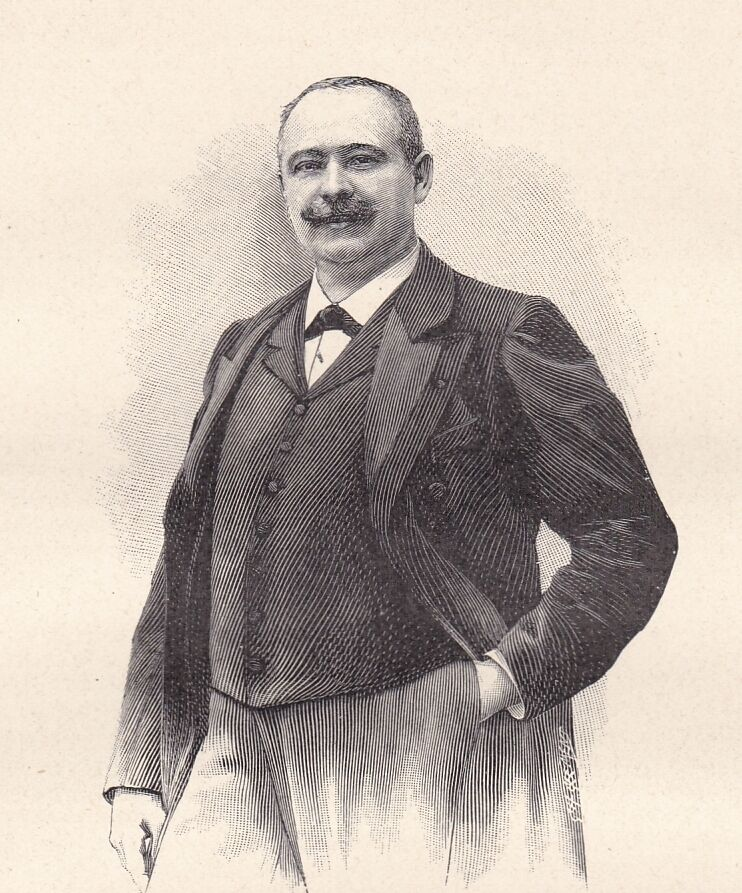
- Born: 16 October 1858; Saint-Palais, Pyrénées-Atlantiques, France
- Died: 28 January 1926 (aged 67); Paris, France
- Occupation: Architect
- Writing career
- Notable works: Grands Magasins Dufayel, Hotel Astoria
- Notable awards: Legion of Honour

Bernard Auguste Rives, known as Gustave Rives (1858–1926), was a French architect who designed residential, institutional, and commercial buildings in France in a style described as "opulent eclecticism." He organized many popular auto and aeronautical shows in Paris before the First World War.

== Life and work ==
Bernard Auguste Rives was born 16 September 1858 in Saint-Palais, Pyrénées-Atlantiques, in the Aquitaine region of France. His parents were Pierre Rives and Victoire Etchart. In 1876, he went to Paris to study at the École des Beaux-Arts under Louis-Jules André and Eugène Train.

In addition to designing many apartment and office buildings throughout Paris in the 1880s and 1890s, Rives enlarged and embellished the Grands Magasins Dufayel in Montmartre, with a dome and an unusual curving staircase, as well as large spaces for displaying merchandise.

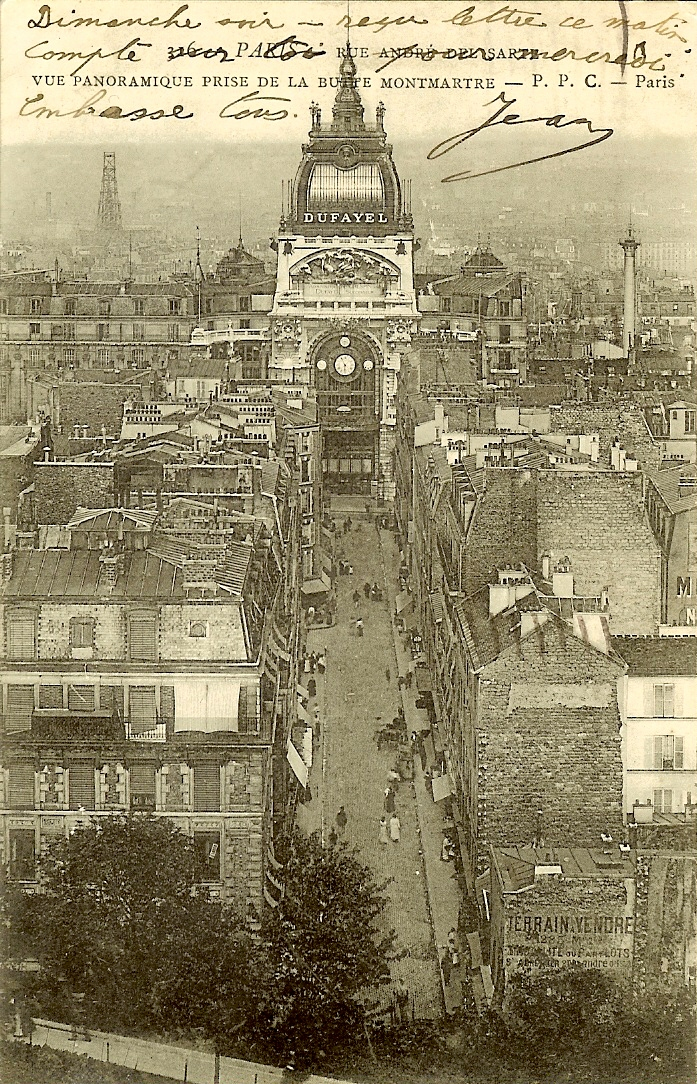
The Dufayel Department Store in Paris

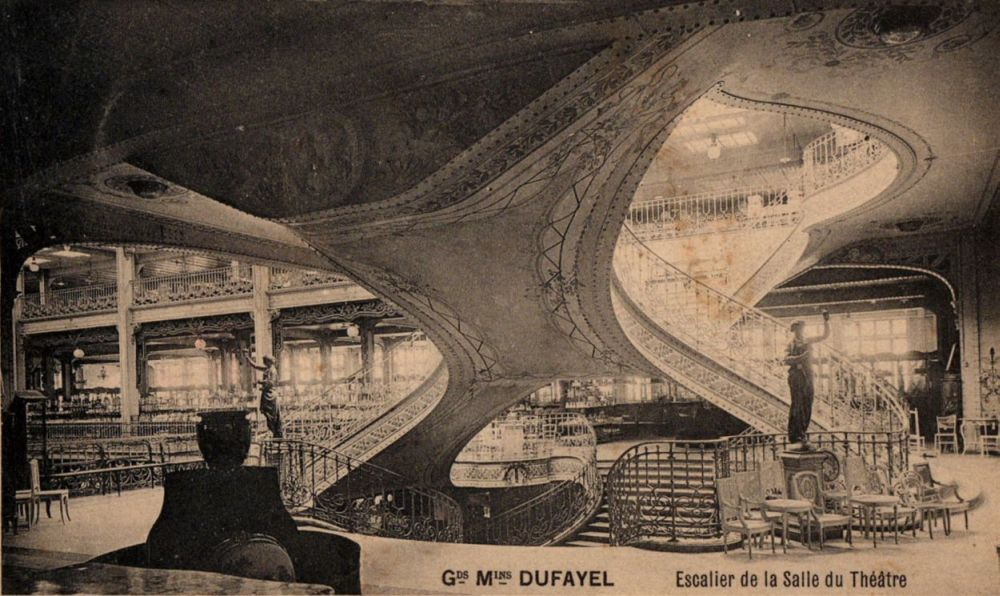
Staircase in the Dufayel Department Store

Rives also built a house on the Champs-Elysées for the store's founder, Georges Dufayel. After the death of Dufayel in 1916, this house was used as a press club during the Paris Peace Conference of 1919 (it was demolished in the 1920s to make way for a shopping arcade).

Also in collaboration with Georges Dufayel, Rives created at least two major resort buildings for Sainte-Adresse, in Normandy, in the quartier known as Le Nice-Havrais. One, the Immeuble Dufayel, a residential building, still stands. The other, l'Hotellerie, was used as the headquarters for the Belgian government in exile during the First World War, and was demolished by the occupying German army in the Second World War.

L'Hotellerie, Sainte-Adresse, Association pour le Patrimoine de Sainte-Adresse (APSA)

Rives served as architect for the Crédit Foncier of Algeria, the Société Foncière Lyonnaise, and the Compagnie d'Assurances Générales. He also designed several hotels for the town of Menton on the Riviera. A large part of his work was the design of rental apartment buildings in Paris. His work was recognized by the City of Paris in the Concours des Façades in 1899, when he won a prize for a building at 45, rue du Chateau d’Eau in the 10th arrondissement.

Another prominent Paris building was the Hotel Astoria on the Champs-Elysées, built in 1907. Some critics complained that its high domes detracted from the view of the Arc de Triomphe nearby. This building was destroyed by fire in 1972.

Between 1901 and 1910, Rives was manager and organizer for special events at the Grand Palais in Paris, particularly the popular automobile and aeronautical shows. For each one, he designed elaborate temporary decorations. The aeronautical show was a spin-off from the auto shows:

In 1908 during the 11th Paris Motor Show ... that show's organizer, Gustave Rives, set up an aeronautical exhibition for the few flying machines in France at that time. The success of the aeronautical display at the automobile show led the next year to the "Exposition de la Locomotion Aerienne," a full exhibition of aircraft with 380 exhibitors and some 100,000 visitors. The show was hosted by France’s first aerospace industries' trade association, the Chambre Syndicale de L'industrie Aeronautique, created by pioneer aircraft manufacturers such as Louis Bleriot, Louis-Charles Breguet and Gabriel Voisin. The aircraft were floated on barges up the Seine and carried on horse-drawn wagons to the Grand Palais.

Rives published substantial reports on these shows. He also redesigned the interior of the French Automobile Club on the Place de la Concorde in Paris.

Gustave Rives was made a Commander of the Legion of Honour in 1908 and held the post of Chief Architect of the City of Paris and Directeur des Palais civils et nationaux.

In 1885, Rives married Jeanne-Gabrielle de Lavaysse (1865–1942), and had three children: Edouard Roger Marcel (b. 1886), Jean Angèly Georges (1889–1964), and Germaine (b. c.1892).

In 1907, Rives bought the Chateau de Jeufosse near Gaillon in Eure, Haute Normandie. He died in Paris on 28 January 1926 at 14, rue de l'Université. He was buried at Jeufosse.

== Buildings designed or decorated by Gustave Rives ==
The following were designed in whole or in part by Gustave Rives and are still standing:

- Hotel Alexandra, Menton (1885), now the Résidence Alexandra
- 80, rue Charles-Laffitte, Neuilly-sur-Seine, 92000 (1888)
- 11 bis, rue de Lauriston, 16e, Paris (1888)
- 178, rue Legendre, 17e, Paris (1888)
- 182, rue Legendre, 17e, Paris (1890)
- 39, rue St-Dominique, 7e, Paris (1890)
- 10, avenue d’Eylau, 16e, Paris (1890)
- 36, avenue d’Eylau, 16e, Paris (1890)
- 12 & 16, rue de Bourgogne, 7e, Paris (1891)
- 1, avenue de Versailles / rue Maurice Bourdet (1891)
- 4, rue Trévise, 9e, Paris (1892)
- 8, rue de Chantilly, 9e, Paris (1893)
- 2, rue Trévise / 22 rue Bergère, 9e, Paris (1894)
- 18, rue Boissière, 16e, Paris (1894)
- 108–110, avenue Kléber, 16e, Paris (1894–95)
- 23 and 23 bis, avenue Niel, 17e, Paris (1894 and 1898)
- 64, rue Jean de la Fontaine, 16e, Paris (1895)
- 107, rue de la Pompe, 16e, Paris (1895)
- Grand Magasins Dufayel, 30, rue de Clignancourt, 18e, Paris: the original building by Alfred Le Bègue and Stephan Le Bègue was enlarged in 1895 and 1900 by Gustave Rives. Rives’ dome has been removed, the curving staircase has been demolished, and his former grand entrance is now the back of a building that serves as the offices of a bank.
- 11 & 11bis, rue du Perche, 3e, Paris (1896)
- 129, boulevard du Montparnasse, 6e, Paris (1897)
- 1-1bis, rue de la Pompe, 16e, Paris (1897)
- 5, rue d’Edimbourg, 8e, Paris (1897)
- 16-16bis, rue de Lubeck / 2 rue Hamelin, 16e, Paris (1897)
- 20, rue Boissière, 16e, Paris (1897–98)
- 128, boulevard de Courcelles, 17e, Paris (1897–98)
- 11, rue Boissière, 16e, Paris (1898)
- 4, place Victor Hugo, 16e, Paris (1898)
- 45, rue du Chateau d’Eau, 10e, Paris (1898), winner of the Concours des Façades
- 7, rue Rembrandt, 8e, Paris, at the corner of the rue de Lisbonne (1898–99)
- 14, rue Pelouze (corner of the rue Constantinople), 8e, Paris (1899)
- Musée Grévin (wax museum), 9e, Paris (1888–1900)
- 1 rue Villaret de Joyeuse/2 rue Brunel, 17e, Paris (1901)
- 2 rue Villaret de Joyeuse/1 rue des Acacias, 17e, Paris (1902)
- 17 rue Rennequin / 27 rue Fourcroy, 17e, Paris (1903)
- 13 avenue Raymond Poincaré, 16e, Paris (1905)
- 43, rue des Petits-Champs, 1er, Paris (1911)
- Immeuble Dufayel, Sainte-Adresse (1911)
- Automobile Club of France, 6, place de la Concorde, 8e, Paris (1912): Rives created the interior spaces for the club in an existing building
- 36 rue Damrémont, 18e, Paris (1907)
- 4 rue d’Iéna/16 rue Fresnel, 16e, Paris (1912) – creation of a new façade for le comte de Cambacérès (building is now the Embassy of Iran)

The following major buildings by Rives have been destroyed or demolished:

- Archives of the Crédit Lyonnais, rue de la Glacière, 13e, Paris (1890; demolished 1970)
- House for Gabriel Thomas, 2 rue des Capucins, Meudon, Hauts-de-Seine (1890; demolished 1988 to make way for the Parc Gilbert Gauer)
- 80 Avenue des Champs-Elysées, Hotel particulier de Georges Dufayel (1894; demolished in the 1920s)
- Hotel Astoria, 122, avenue des Champs-Elysées (built 1907; destroyed by fire in 1972)
- Casino Marie Christine, Le Havre (1912; demolished 1960)
- Hôtel de voyageurs, known as “l'Hôtellerie,” Sainte-Adresse (1913; destroyed in 1942)

Statues and monuments

- Statue of Édouard Pailleron, Parc Monceau (1906), with sculptor Léopold Bernstamm
- Monument to Émile Levassor, Porte Maillot (1907), with sculptures by Camille Lefevre, after a design by Jules Dalou
- Monument to Pierre Waldeck-Rousseau, Jardin des Tuileries, Paris (1909), with sculptures by Laurent Honoré Marqueste

== Publications ==
- "Hotel Bedrooms from the Sanitary Point of View", Journal of the Sanitary Institute, c.1900
- Exposition décennale de l’automobile, du cycle, et des sports, 1908
- Congrès international des applications du moteur à mélange tonnant et du Moteur à Combustion Interne aux Marines de Guerre, de Commerce, de Peche et de Plaisance, 1908
- Rapport sur le premier salon de l’aeronautique, 1908
