= Grands Magasins Dufayel =

Former Parisian department store

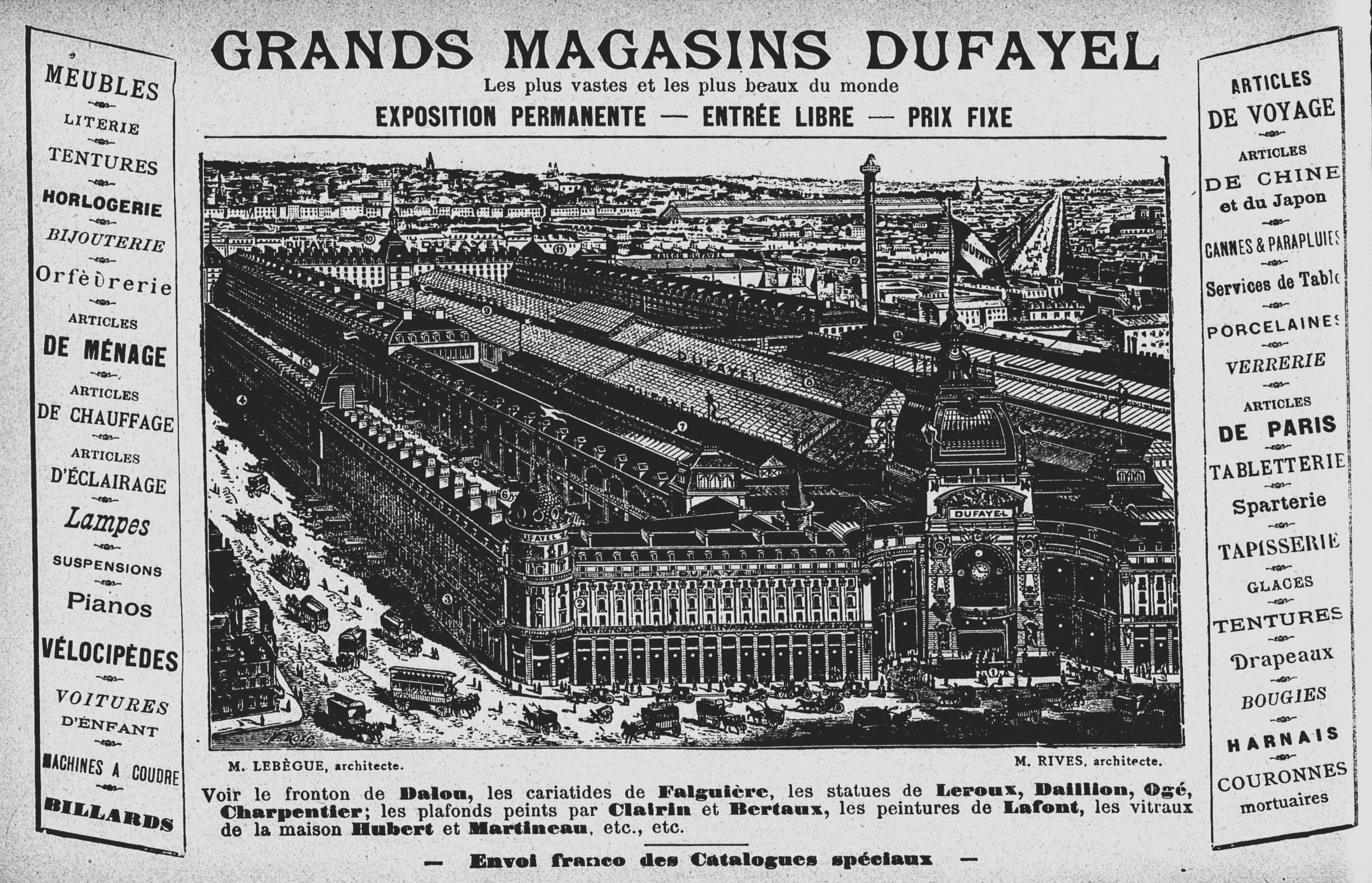
Advert of the Grands Magasins Dufayel billed as "the largest and most beautiful in the world" with emphasis on the building's artistic decoration, 1896

The Grands Magasins Dufayel was a leading department store in Paris, France, created in 1856 by Jacques François Crespin as the Palais de la Nouveauté (lit. 'Palace of Novelty'), and developed by Crespin's erstwhile employee Georges Dufayel who renamed it after himself in 1890. Aimed at a working-class clientele, it innovated with advertising, art sponsorship and the early development of consumer credit. During its heyday it branded itself as the world's largest department store. The main Dufayel store closed in 1930.

== History ==
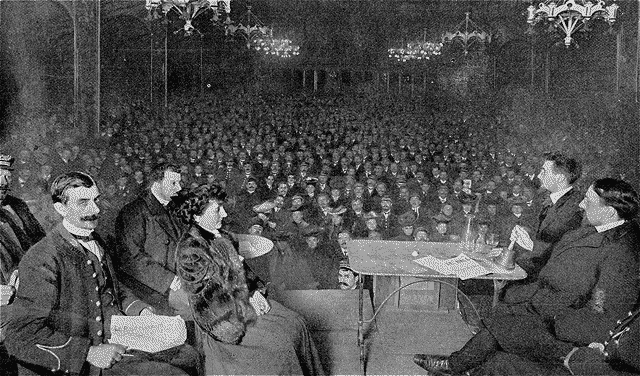
Employees on strike at Dufayel, December 1905

Jacques François Crespin founded the Palais de la Nouveauté in 1856, initially as a furniture store at 11-15, boulevard Ornano, a recently opened thoroughfare that would be renamed boulevard Barbès in 1882. The store was located in a working-class area of Paris, unlike most rival department stores such as Le Bon Marché, Bazar de l'Hôtel de Ville, La Samaritaine, Printemps, or Galeries Lafayette. That allowed many of more modest means access to a similar shopping experience as middle-class customers, and encouraged workers to view shopping as a social activity.

In 1888, Crespin died and his close associate Georges Dufayel took over the business, of which he secured sole ownership two years later, allowing for the change of name in 1890. Dufayel then developed the retail operation aggressively, leveraging the prestige of Parisian culture with the addition of a 3,000-seat hall and a schedule of free lectures, science demonstrations, and performances to draw in customers, complemented from 1896 with film projections, among the earliest in Paris. The Dufayel customer base reached 2.4 million in 1900, and 3.5 million in 1904. By then, there were also 17 Dufayel branch stores outside Paris. Beyond consumer credit, Dufayel developed other financial services including insurance, and was a pioneer in large-scale advertising on the walls of Paris.

Employees at the Grands Magasins Dufayel worked long hours, and Dufayel introduced fines on employees coming late. In December 1905, staff went on strike for a few days to protest the actions of two abusive managers. By 1912, the Dufayel headcount had reached 15,000.

Georges Dufayel died without issue in 1916. His will triggered the transformation of his firm from sole proprietorship to a joint-stock company whose shareholders where the store's employees. The franchise declined after World War I, however, and eventually the Grands Magasins Dufayel went bankrupt in 1925. Following the bankruptcy a department store remained in operation until at least 1935 on the boulevard Barbès side of the compound, branded Palais de la Nouveauté.

== Consumer credit ==
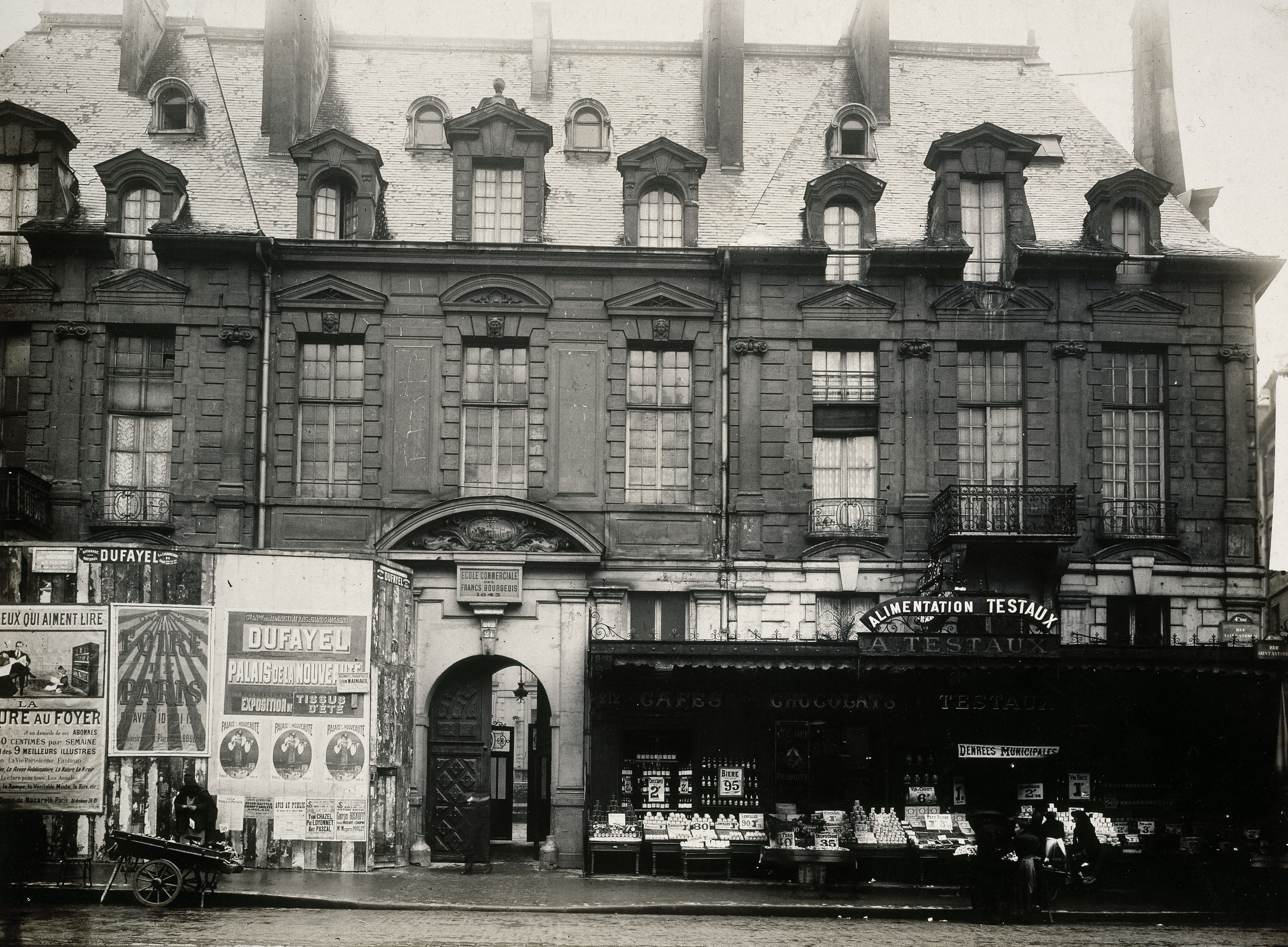
Dufayel advert on the Hôtel de Mayenne, Paris

Based on his experience of running a photography store, Crespin designed a pioneering credit system in which customers could earn vouchers worth five times the amount they paid in cash, and use these vouchers to make further purchases that they would reimburse later on set terms. According to an advertisement from 1879, the "Crespin vouchers" were accepted in three hundred fixed-price stores across France. After taking over in the late 1880s, Dufayel developed this system further, taking a 18 percent commission on all sales.

By the early 1900s, 800 investigators (so-called abonneurs with reference to the customers' subscription or abonnement to the credit service) were employed by Dufayel to assess the customers' solvency. Some of their information came from Parisian concierges, incentivized to provide insight by preferential conditions at the store. The solvency assessments also allowed Dufayel to identify promising new business lines. Dufayel also developed one of the first French advertising agencies, publishing surveys and compiling mailing lists.

In 1913, La Semeuse de Paris became a direct competitor to Dufayel's consumer credit operations by serving customers of La Samaritaine. Dufayel retorted by starting selling apparel to compete directly with La Samaritaine.

== Flagship building and decoration ==
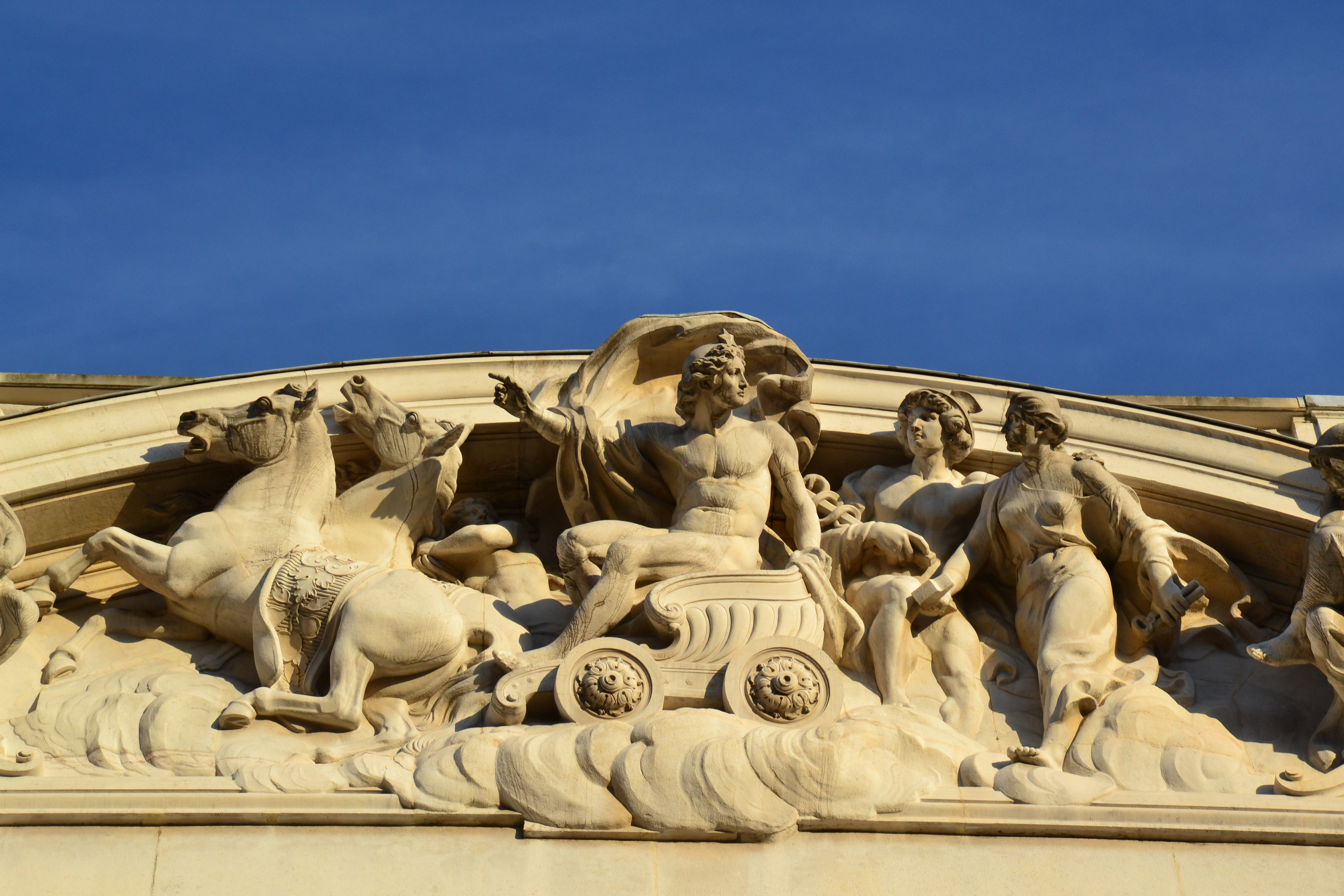
Progress leading Trade and Industry, allegorical group sculpted by Jules Dalou (1895) above the main entrance on rue de Clignancourt

The main building grew in stages within the large city block between rue de Clignancourt, rue Christiani, boulevard Barbès, and rue de la Nation (known since 1971 as rue de Sofia). In 1874, Crespin commissioned the first purpose-built expansion designed by architect Alfred Le Bègue, then assisted by his son Stephan.

After taking over in 1890, Dufayel entrusted a comprehensive building program to architect Gustave Rives, who erected a monumental entrance on 22, rue de Clignancourt, topped up by a 55-meter-high glass dome with a searchlight that made it prominently visible from all over Paris and around. The program entailed lavish artistic sponsorship with 200 statues, 180 paintings, a giant stained steel window, and the involvement of noted painters and sculptors including Georges Clairin, Horace Daillion, Jules Dalou, Alexandre Falguière, Gaston Veuvenot Leroux, and Pierre-Marie-François Ogé. The entrance porch was overlooked by a monumental relief by Dalou and flanked by two large allegorical bronze groups by Falguière, respectively representing Advertising (French: la publicité) and Credit, the two areas in which Dufayel had most distinctive leadership. Rives then designed two towering rotundas on boulevard Barbès, at the respective corners with rue de la Nation and rue Christiani. The expansion was completed in 1913, with the store surface reaching around 38,000 square meters. By then nearly the entire block had been remodeled for the store, except on the southwestern corner where a few older structures remained unchanged.

During World War II the disaffected complex was used for storage of equipment by the occupation authorities, then by the American Red Cross. In 1951, it was acquired by the Banque Nationale pour le Commerce et l'Industrie (BNCI) which used it for its sprawling securities services operations, with up to six thousand staff on site. The BNCI had the iconic dome demolished in 1957. Falguière's bronze statues of Advertising and Credit were acquired by Daisaku Ikeda, founder of Soka Gakkai International, and transported to Japan in 1969. They were both installed on the campus of Sōka University in Hachiōji near Tokyo at its inauguration in 1971.

In 2019, BNCI's successor BNP Paribas sold the building for redevelopment. The (by then) 12,500-square-meter property was renovated by Vinci Immobilier on a design by Paris-based firm Yrieix Martineau Architecture. In February 2026, it was announced that most of the complex would host an AI-themed coworking facility branded Cortex House.

== Gallery ==
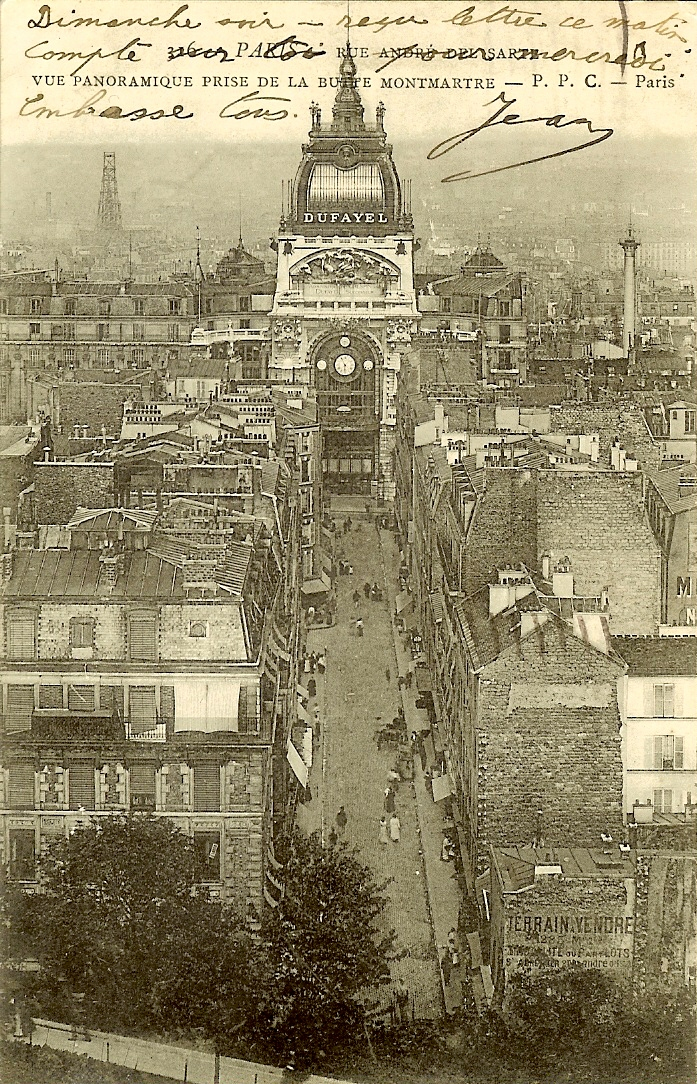
From Montmartre, 1904

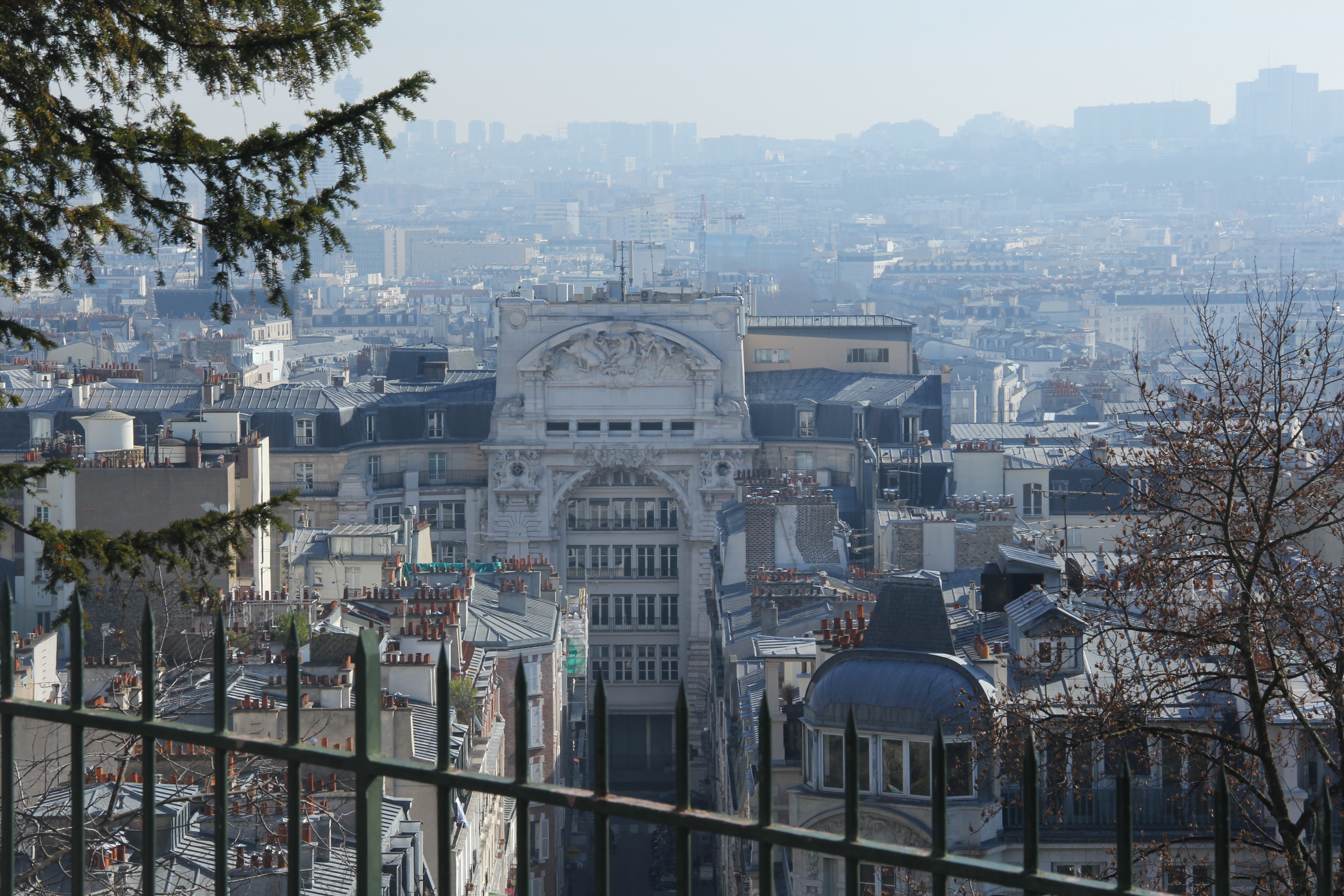
Similar perspective in 2015

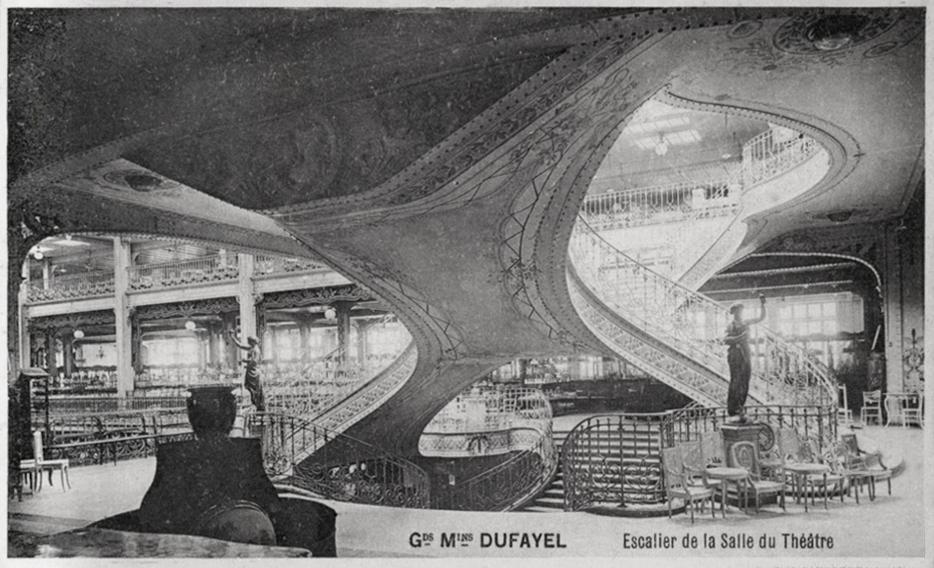
Grand staircase leading to the theater hall, 1905

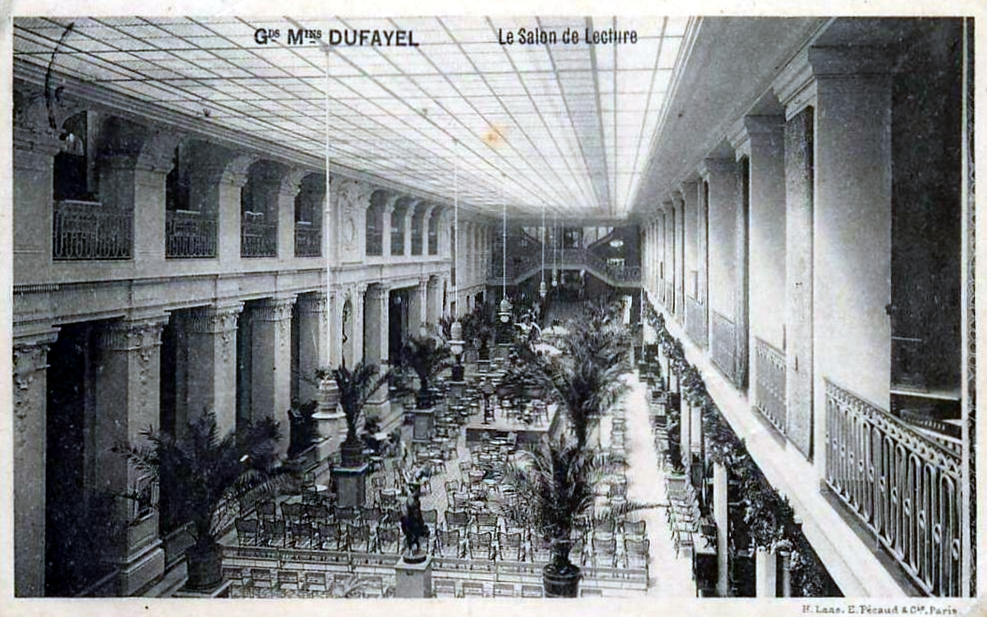
Reading hall

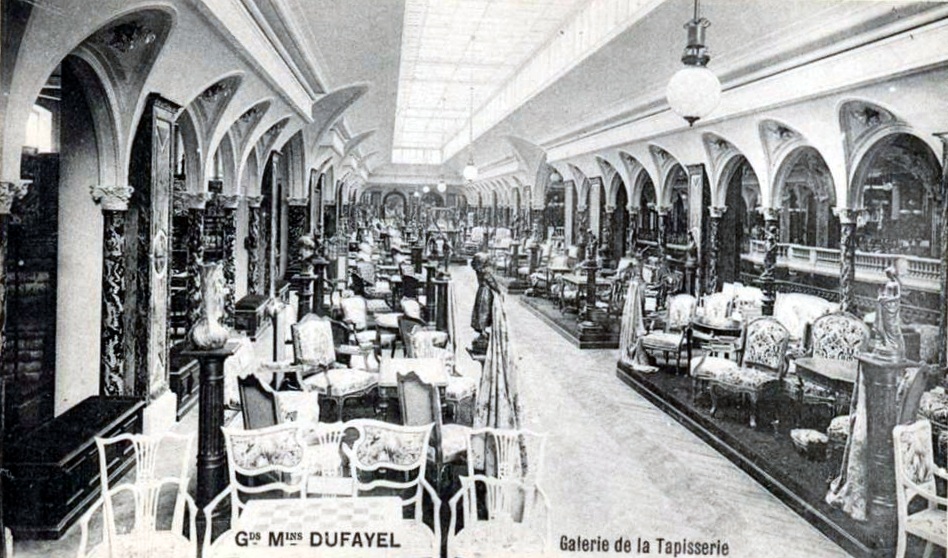
Furniture hall

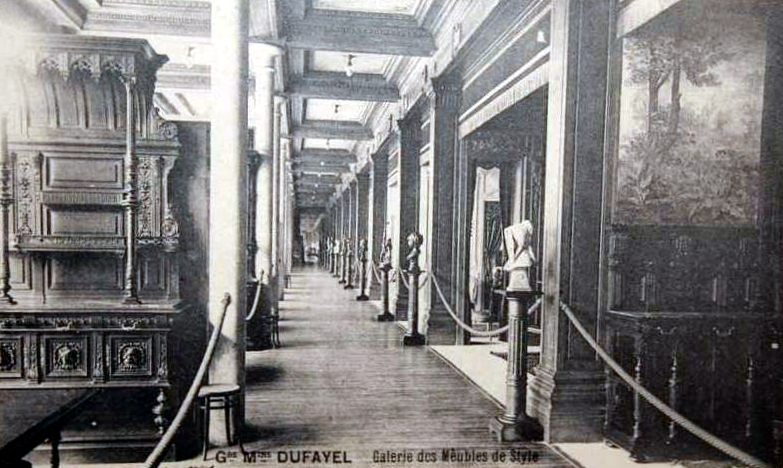
High-end furniture gallery

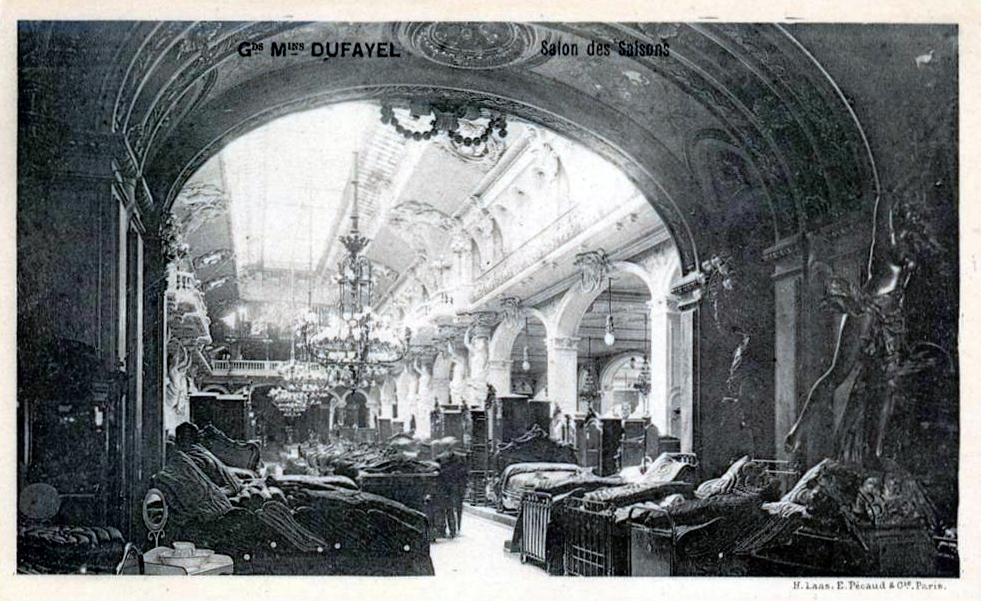
Salon des saisons

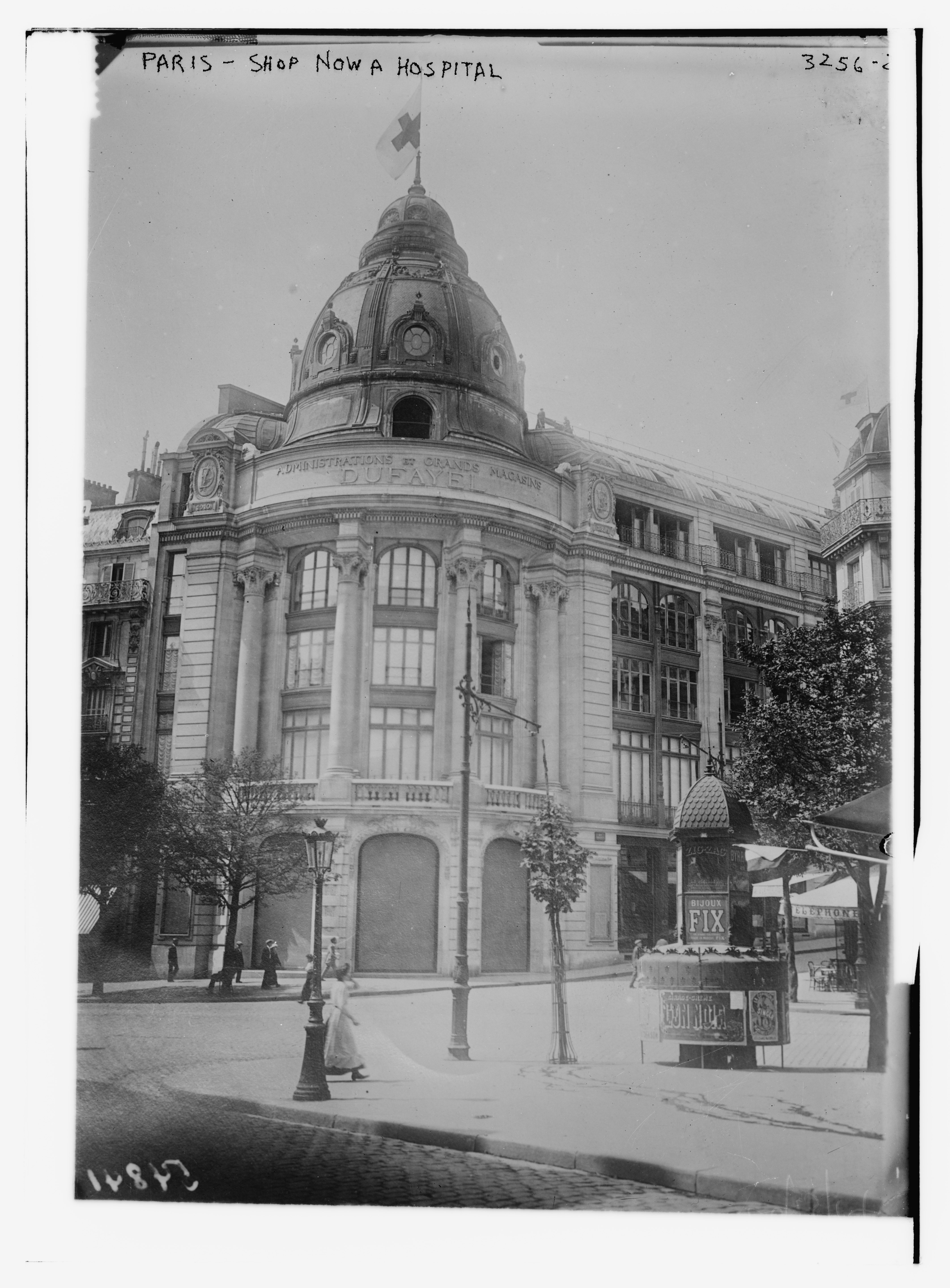
Rotunda section, 1914

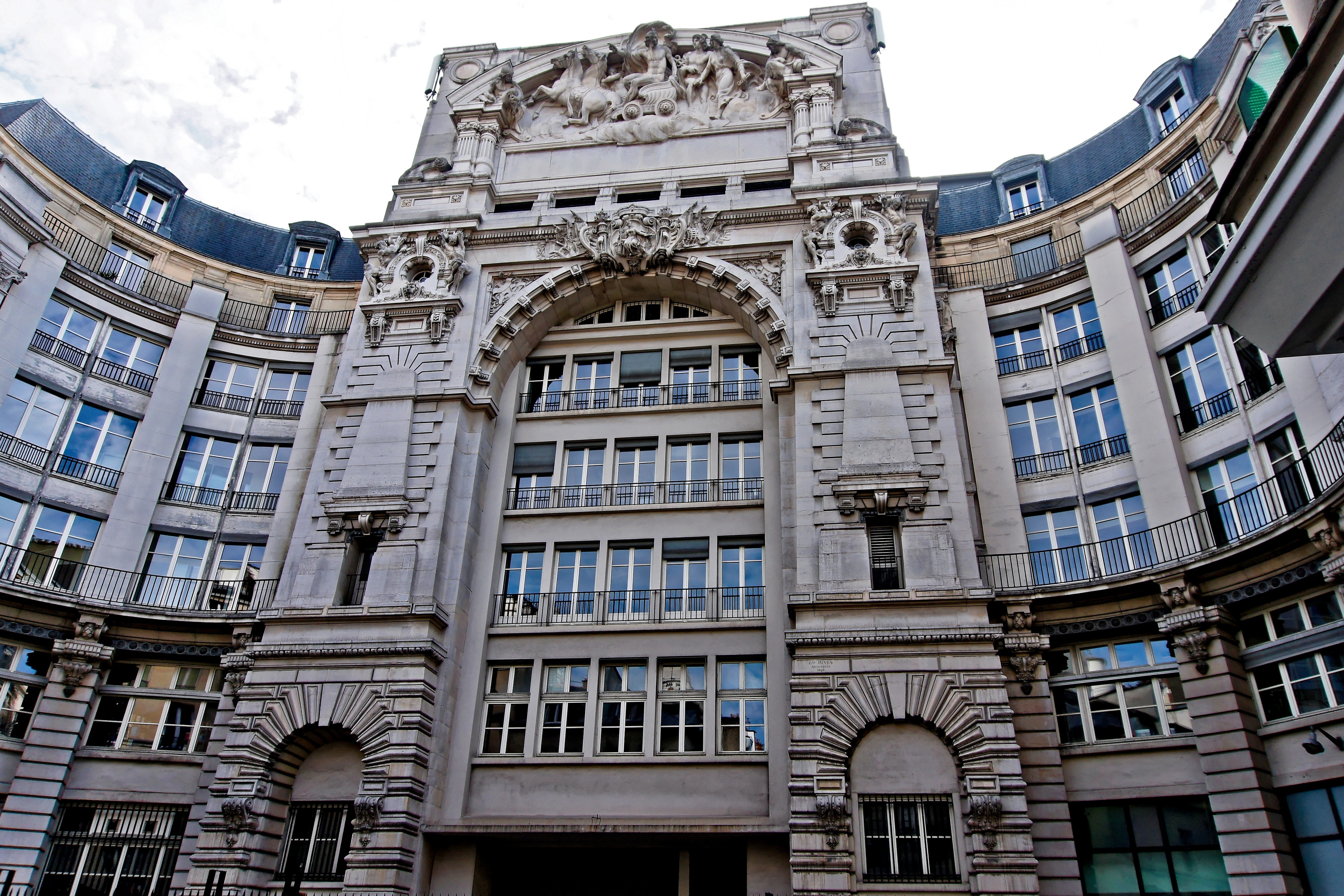
Monumental entrance on rue de Clignancourt, in 2018 before renovation

== See also ==
- List of department stores by country
