= Écoles gratuites de dessin =

The Écoles gratuites de dessin (French for free drawing schools) were several art schools founded in eighteenth-century France, notably the École Royale Gratuite de Dessin in Paris.

Around sixty independent Écoles gratuites de dessin were established in France during the eighteenth century Age of Enlightenment. They provided drawing lessons to the general public, including to apprentices whose craft required the ability to draw. The schools were mostly established in provincial France between 1750 and 1792. In 1777, a royal declaration subjected the schools to the authority of the Académie Royale, but this did not hinder their development.

The schools varied in size from single-teacher schools with a few dozen students to those in Bordeaux and Marseille which had more than twelve teachers and several hundred students. The Paris school of Jean-Jacques Bachelier may have had up to 1,500 students. Some of the schools taught painting and sculpture as well as drawing.

== École Royale Gratuite de Dessin ==
The École Royale Gratuite de Dessin (Royal Free Drawing School), also known as the École Gratuite de Dessin or the Petite École, was founded in 1766 by Jean-Jacques Bachelier, and confirmed in 1767 by letters patent from King Louis XV. After several changes of name, in 1877 the school became the École Nationale des Arts Décoratifs (National School of Decorative Arts) before taking its present name of École Nationale Supérieure des Arts Décoratifs (ENSAD, Higher National School of Decorative Arts) in 1927.
