= Jean-Jacques Bachelier =

French ceramicist and painter

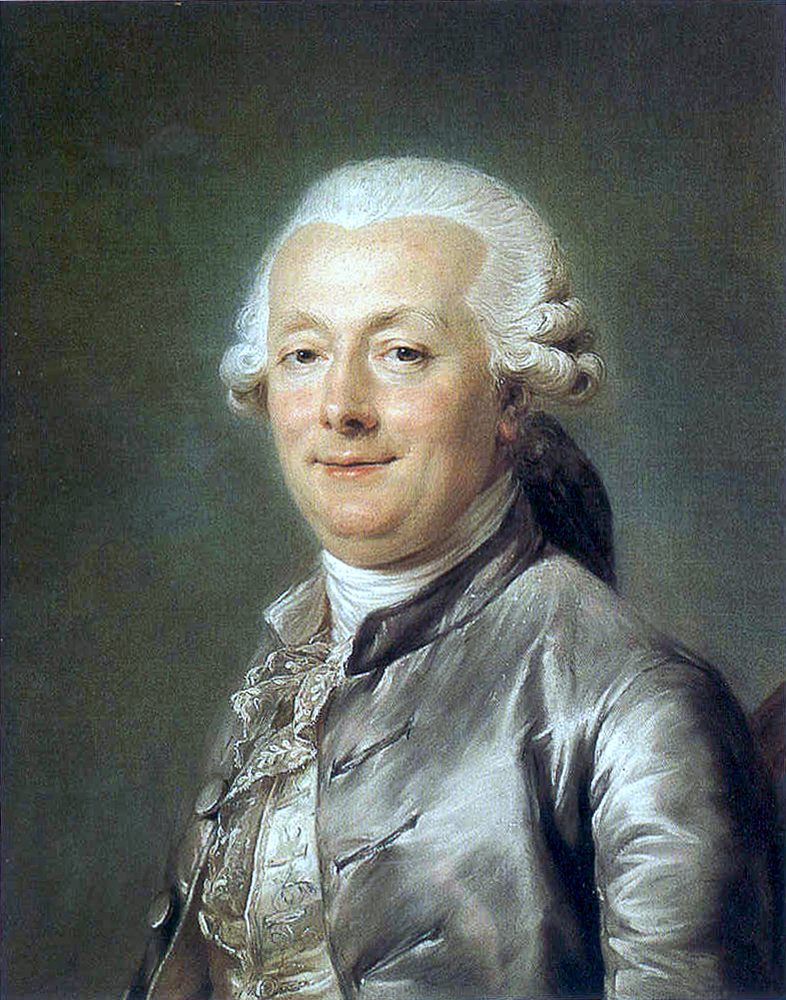
Jean-Jacques-Bachelier, portrait by Adélaïde Labille-Guiard

Jean-Jacques Bachelier (1724–1806) was a French painter and director of the porcelain factory at Sèvres.

Admitted to the Académie Royale de Peinture et de Sculpture in 1752, he founded an art school using his own means in Paris in 1765 for the artisans in the historic collège d'Autun (located on rue de l'école de médecine). His art school survived until the 19th century.

He was in effect the inventor of unglazed biscuit porcelain, in the sense that he was the first to use this material for a final product, in 1751 at Sèvres. Previously this material was no more than a first stage in the porcelain manufacturing process.

== Works ==
For a more extensive list of works see Jean-Jacques Bachelier on the French Wikipedia, which includes Roman Charity (1765).

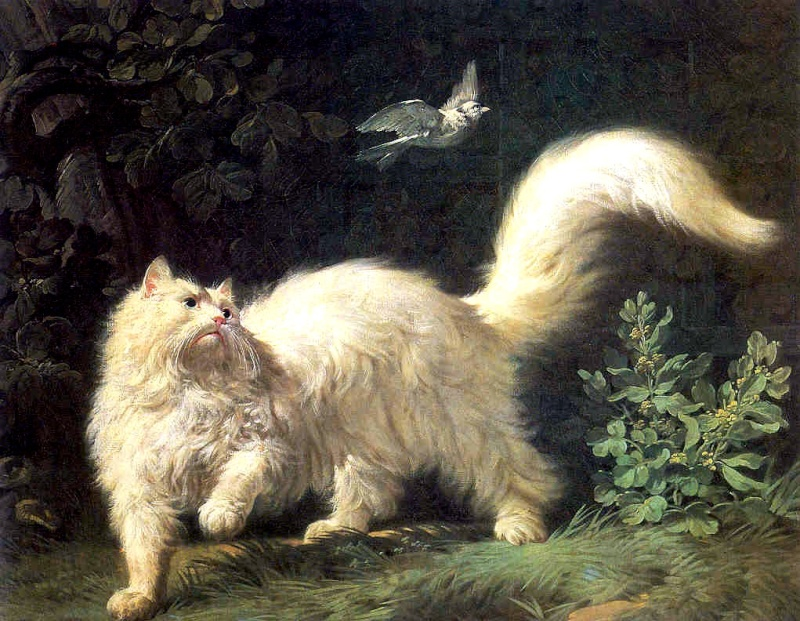
Jean-Jacques Bachelier, An Angora cat

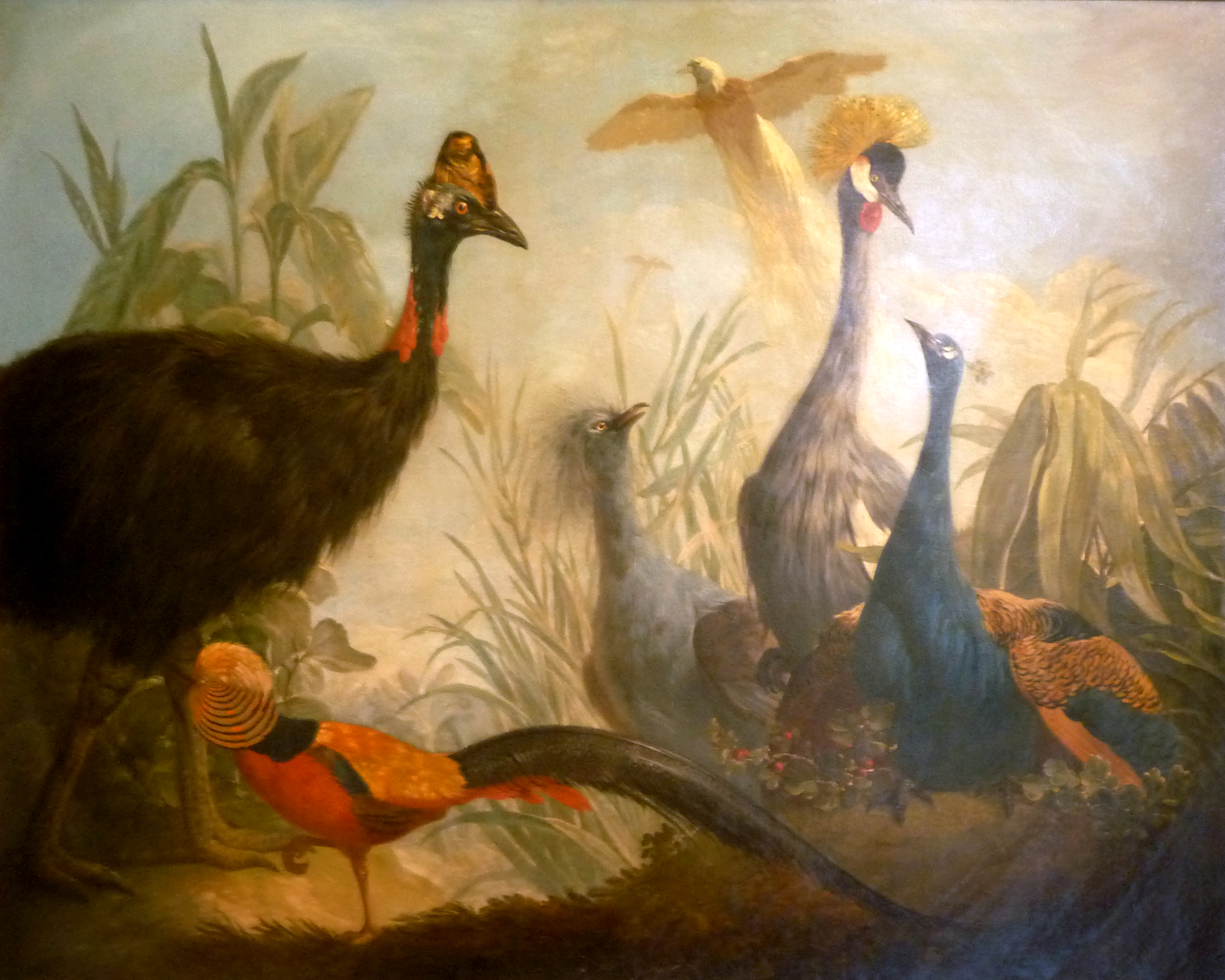
Jean-Jacques Bachelier, Four parts of the world, oil on canvas

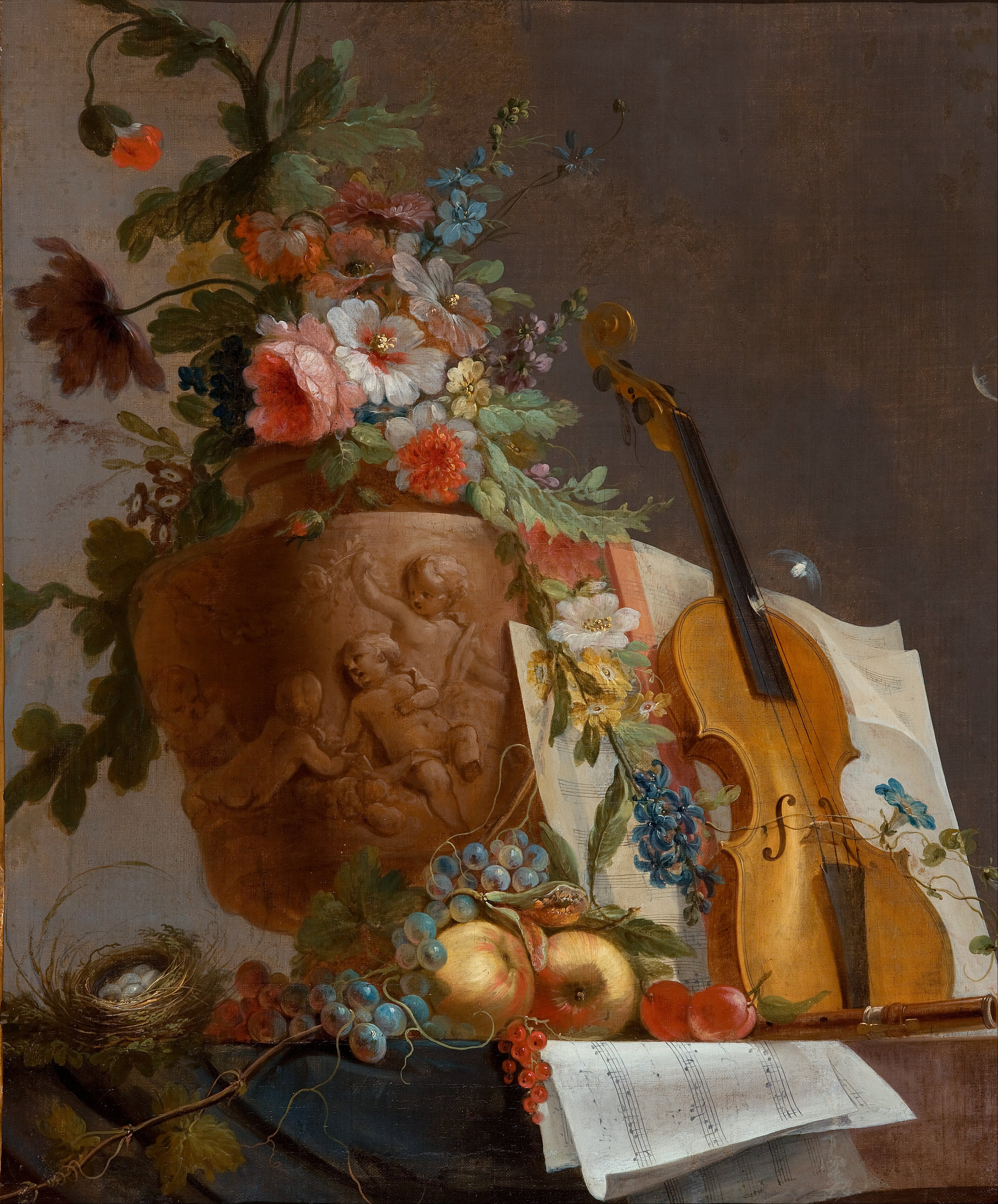
Jean-Jacques Bachelier - Still life with flowers and a violin - Google Art Project

=== Written works ===
- Histoire et secret de la peinture à la cire, contre le sentiment du comte de Caylus. Paris 1755

== Sources ==
- Dictionnaire Bouillet
