= Georges Dufayel =

Parisian retailer and businessman

- Born: 1 January 1855; Paris
- Died: 28 December 1916 (aged 61); Paris
- Occupation: Retailer

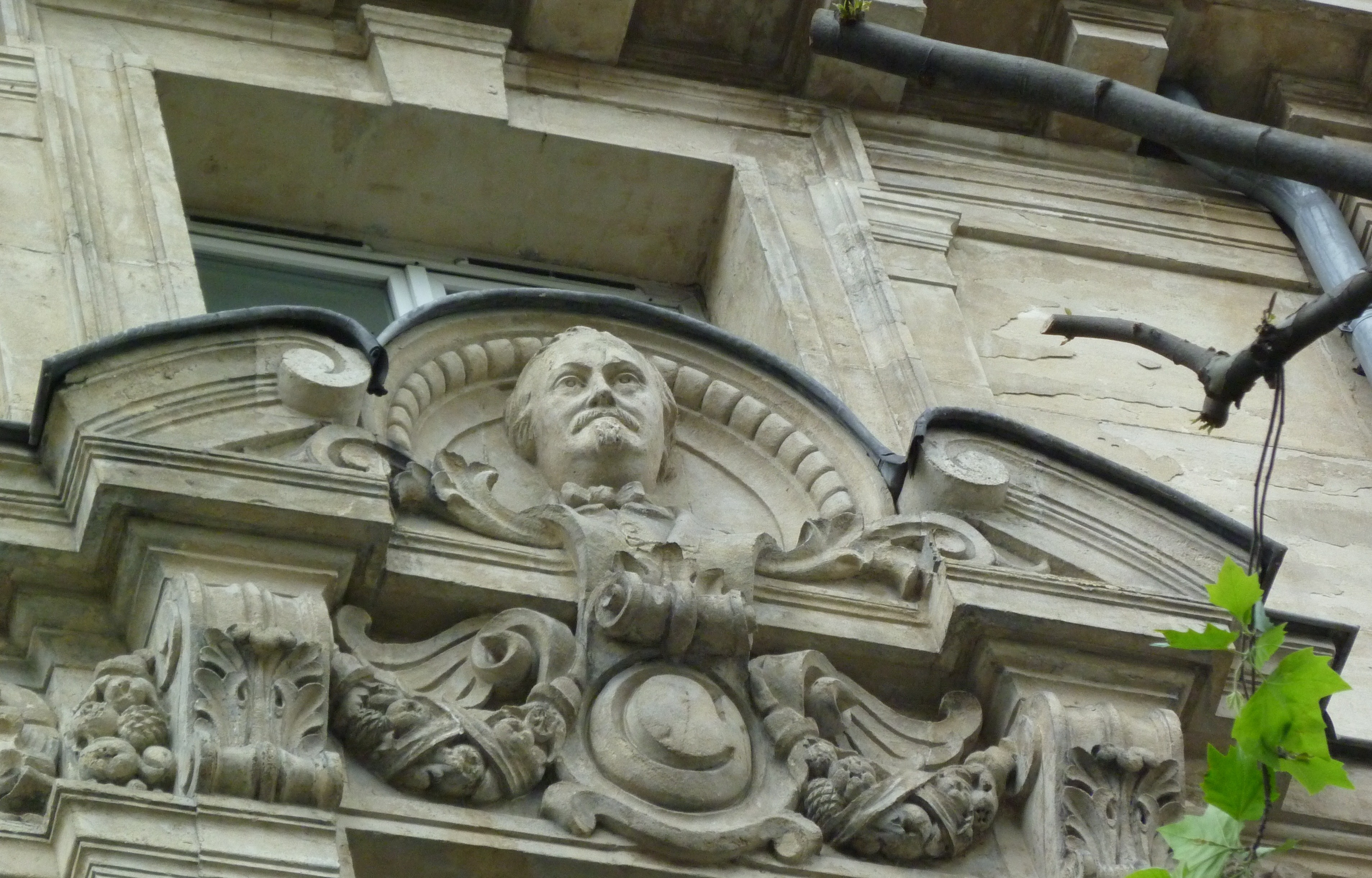
A bust of Georges Dufayel on the façade of the Grands Magasins Dufayel

Georges Dufayel (1 January 1855 – 28 December 1916) was a Parisian retailer and businessman who popularized and expanded the practice of buying merchandise on credit (installment plans) and purchasing from catalogues. He is mainly remembered as the founder of the Grands Magasins Dufayel, a large and opulent department store in the Goutte d'Or district of Paris that sold household furnishings.

== Biography ==
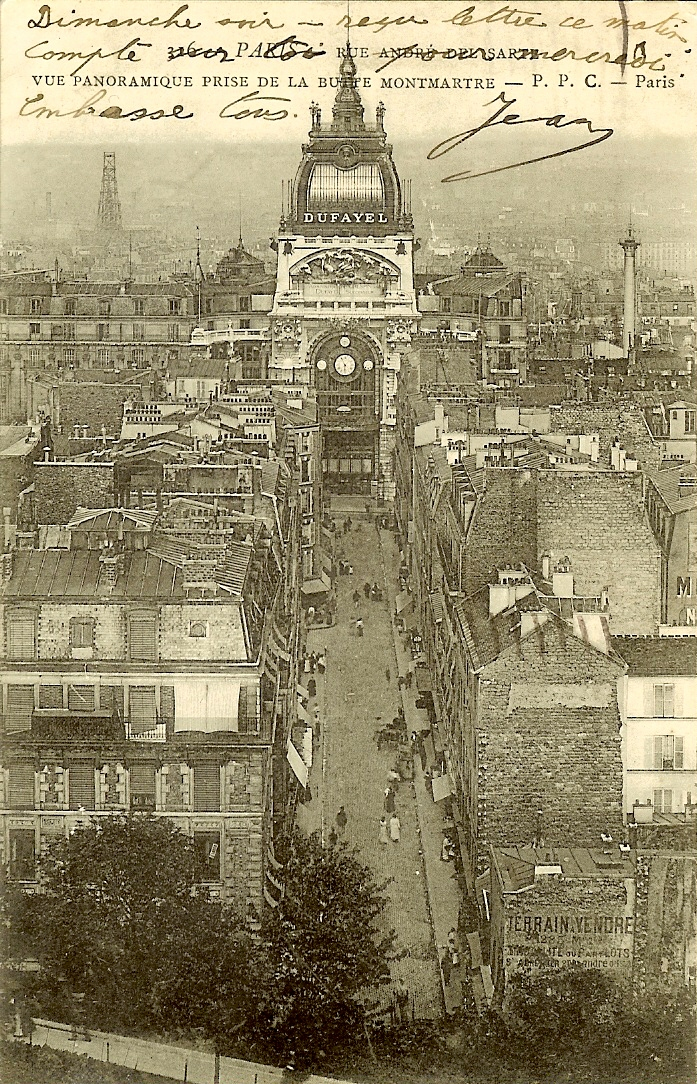
The Dufayel Department Store at 26, rue de Clignancourt, in Paris

Georges Jules Dufayel was born in Paris in 1855, the son of Achille Amand Dufayel and Marie Stéphanie Nicolas. He attended the Maison Dupont-Tuffier school. In 1871, he went to work for Jacques François Crespin (1824–1888), the owner of Le Palais de la Nouveauté in Paris's 18th arrondissement. The store, which Crespin had founded in 1856, sold furnishings and housewares on credit.

Crespin died in 1888. The thirty-three-year-old Dufayel, who had been his close associate, took over direction of the enterprise. In 1890, he became sole proprietor and renamed the store Les Grands Magasins Dufayel. Over the next few years, he developed a new and flamboyant type of retailing. He gradually enlarged the store to include a concert hall, theatre, and winter garden, and offered free lectures, science demonstrations, films, and performances there to draw in customers. The building was topped with a dome surmounted by a searchlight and decorated with sculptures by Alexandre Falguière and Jules Dalou. Between 1901 and 1904, Dufayel published a real-estate catalogue called Indicateur Dufayel, which carried advertisements for apartments and houses for sale or rent.

With his wealth, Dufayel amassed an art collection and bought a house on the avenue Champs-Elysées that had previously belonged to the Duchesse d'Uzès. He demolished the house and started to build an even grander mansion, designed by architect Gustave Rives, who had also worked on the Grands Magasins Dufayel. "One of the most expensive and most pretentious town houses in the world, it was built for the millionaire furniture merchant Dufayel shortly before the [First World] war, but he felt that it was too gorgeous to be lived in and until his death he resided in a more modest dwelling abutting on the court of the palace." After Dufayel died in 1916, the house was used by the French government during the Peace Conference of 1919 as a club for conference officials and members of the foreign press. It was later bought by Standard Oil, but demolished in the early 1920s and replaced by an arcade.

Dufayel also used his wealth to create a seaside resort at Sainte-Adresse, near Le Havre, on the English Channel. It was called "Le Nice-Havrais", designed by architect Ernest Daniel, with imposing buildings and a promenade similar to the one in Nice in the south of France. Gustave Rives contributed designs for the large Immeuble Dufayel, which still stands in the middle of the town, and the Hôtellerie, which was used by the Belgian government in the First World War as Belgium was occupied (it was destroyed by the German army in the Second World War). In the resort town, Dufayel was known as "l'homme à la baignoire d'argent" (the man with the silver bathtub).

Dufayel's obituary in the New York Times notes that he was an officer of the Legion of Honour, a member of the Jury of awards at the Exposition Universelle (1900) in Paris, and a member of the Paris Automobile and Aero Clubs.

Spurned by high society because of his modest origins and his ostentatious tastes, Dufayel avoided all scandal and adopted the motto: "Bien faire et laisser dire," that is, "Do good and let them talk."
