= Hure =

Hure may refer to:

- Hure, Gironde, commune in Gironde, France
- Augusta Hure (1870–1953), French museum curator
- Whore in German
- in Mongolian "hure" means "camp/yurt"
  - Hure Banner, subdivision of Inner Mongolia, China
  - Hüree City, former name of Ulan Bator, Mongolia

== See also ==
- Huré
