= Harry Eliott =

Harry Eliott, born Charles Edmond Hermet (14 June 1882 in Paris – 29 May 1959 in Villez-sous-Bailleul), was a French painter and illustrator.

== Biography ==
Eliott was the son of a lithographer. An Anglophile, he took up an English pseudonym at an early age and tried to pass for an Englishman.

He was called up for the army in 1914, and married a young woman from Normandy in 1915, where he settled in 1917 after treatment for depression. The couple also lived in England for a while.

At the beginning of the twentieth century, he made a living doing illustrations for Nos loisirs, Mon journal, Le Sourire, and la Revue Illustrée. As an artist he is best known for his humorous stenciled prints, and hunting scenes in the Victorian style of Randolph Caldecott and above all Cecil Aldin, illustrator for Charles Dickens. He was one of a number of French Dickens illustrators active in the 1930s.

He also illustrated youth novels, most notable those published by Hachette for their Bibliothèque verte collection, which published well-known novels such as David Copperfield and White Fang. From 1923 to 1940 he drew cover illustrations for Le Chasseur français, an important publication for hunters, and for the catalogs of Manufrance, a mail order company.

== Bibliography ==
- Judith Cernogora, Harry Eliott, le gentleman illustrateur, coédition Point de vues et Musée de Vernon. ISBN 978-2-915548-64-8
- Brigitte Rozaire-Drouet, Mes souvenirs de Harry Eliott, Gilles Gallas éditeur, 2009
- Françoise Poulain et Maurice Delattre, Harry Eliot le plus anglais des illustrateurs français, Images de Beaumont, 1994

Internet

- Biographie de Harry Eliott
- Bibliothèque nationale de France (pour les illustrations de livres)

=== External links ===
- Harry-Eliott club
