= Ström Paris =

French tailoring house, circa 1850–1920

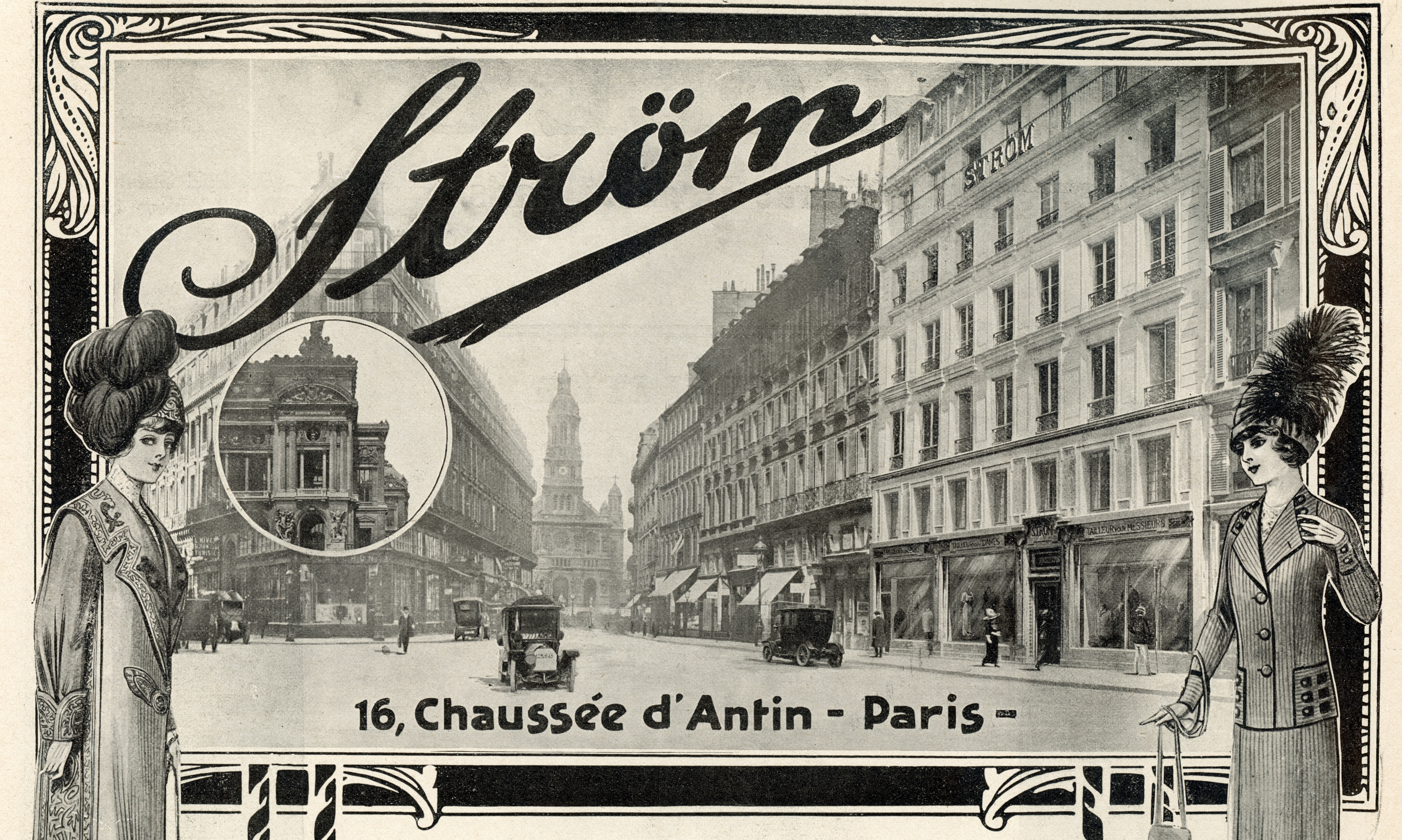
- The Ström boutique at 16 Rue de la Chaussée-d'Antin, Paris (1911)
- Original name: Ström Paris
- Status: Historical
- Industry: Couture, clothing, sports accessories
- Founded: 1848
- Founder: Olé Olsen Ström
- Active period: 1848–c. 1950
- Headquarters: Paris, France

Ström Paris (also known as O. Ström & Fils) were French makers of fine clothing, active in Paris from 1848 through the early 20th century. The firm specialized in bespoke garments for men and women, with a focus on luxury sportswear for motoring, aviation, and outdoor sports.

== History ==
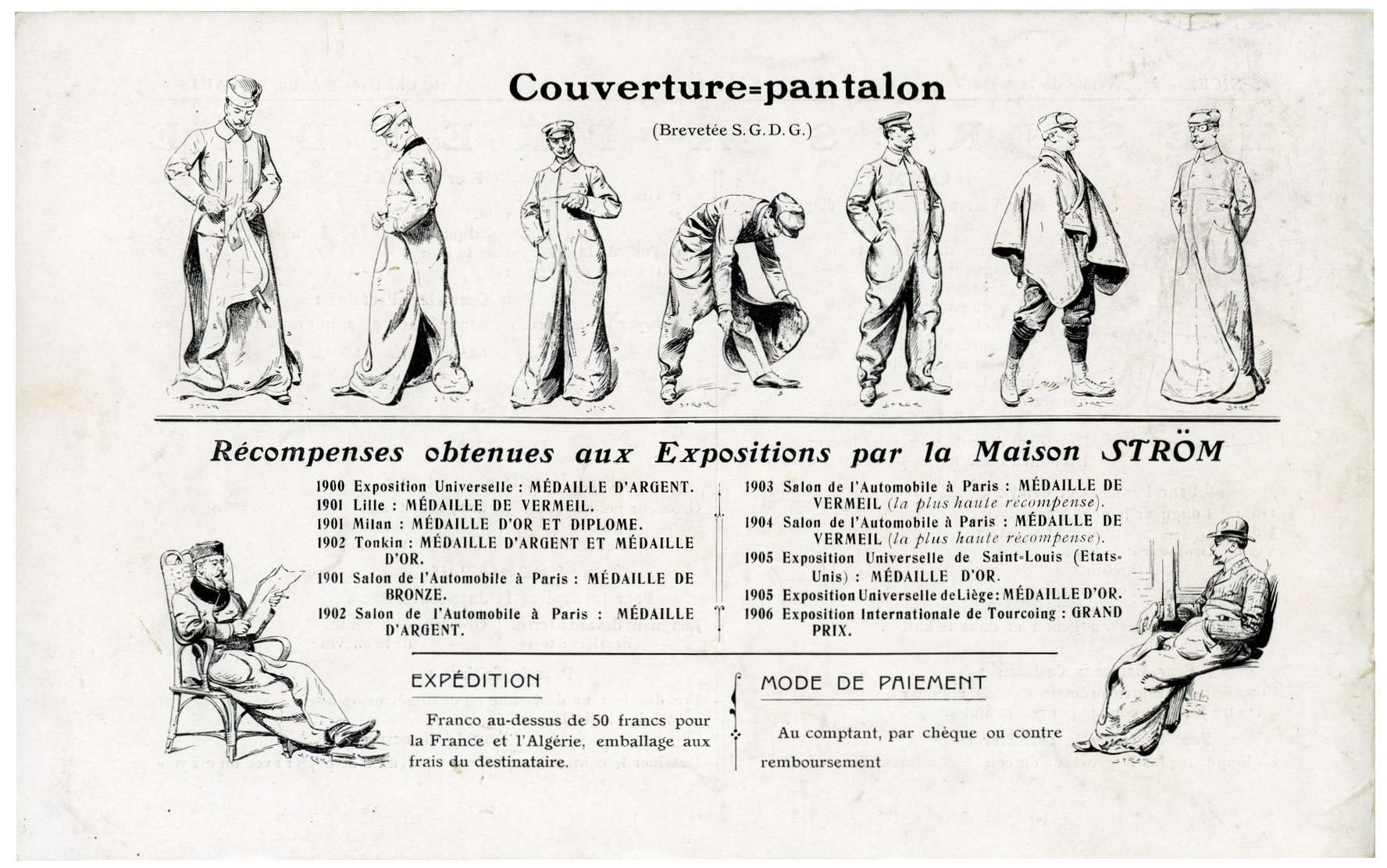
A listing of honors and medals awarded to the house at international exhibitions between 1900 and 1906.

Established in 1848 by Norwegian-born Olé Olsen Ström (1827–1904), the house initially focused on high society tailoring in Paris. By the 1880s, they operated as O. Ström & Fils and held royal warrants for the monarchs of Sweden, Norway, and Belgium. The house maintained salons at 4, rue de Grammont in Paris, before moving to larger premises at 16, Rue de la Chaussée-d’Antin. After the second World War the company relocated to the Rue Royale.

In the late1880s, Ström's sons, Gustave Adolphe and Albert, joined the business. The Ström family was deeply integrated into the early European motorsport circuit; Gustave Ström married the sister of the racing driver Alfred Velghe (known as "Levegh"). The House won numerous awards in international exhibitions, including a Silver Medal at the 1900 Exposition Universelle in Paris and a Gold Medal at the 1904 Louisiana Purchase Exposition in St. Louis. To document their collections, the House collaborated with notable artists; artists Georges de Feure and Nils Forsberg Junior were commissioned to design sales catalogues, and the illustrator O'Galop produced illustrations featuring Charles Ström wearing Ström patented inventions.

== Sporting attire and patents ==
Ström was an early inventor of specialized clothing for motorists and aviators, and were official suppliers to the Automobile Club de France since its inception, as well as to the Paris Yacht Club, and the Aéro-Club de France. To address the conditions of open-top travel, the firm filed several patents with the National Institute of Industrial Property (INPI):

- Couverture-pantalon (blanket-trousers, 1899): A wool or fur covering designed to be used as a blanket that could be fastened around the legs for protection while driving.
- Parapluie du chauffeur (Chauffeur's umbrella, 1901): A waterproof garment with an elastic rubber collar intended to prevent water ingress at the neck.

Beyond apparel, the house produced safety equipment, such as the "Life-jacket pillow-belt" (Oreiller-Ceinture de Sauvetage), a patented invention with an air chamber, bird-down and a safety valve, designed for use by sailors and early motorists.

The firm's garments were used by prominent racing drivers including Léon Théry, Camille Jenatzy, Louis Wagner, Alfred Velghe, René de Knyff, and Joe Tracy, as well as early aviators such as Louis Blériot and Henri Farman, and explorer Jean-Baptiste Charcot during French Antarctic expeditions. Tracy's personal silk racing mask and goggles, used circa 1905, are preserved in the collections of The Henry Ford.

== Collections and legacy ==
The firm's historical output and primary documentation are preserved in several international public collections:

- Metropolitan Museum of Art: The museum holds a silk hat (c. 1900) and a bespoke men's waistcoat featuring the house's original labels.
- The Henry Ford: The digital archives include primary artifacts from the house's automotive era.
- Bibliothèque Forney: A 1906 trade catalogue illustrating garments for motoring, aviation, hunting and winter sports.
- Palais Galliera: The museum's collections and documentary resources preserve historical commercial catalogues and period textile items and accessories.
- Archives de Paris: Corporate registration records (actes de société), commercial correspondence, promotional catalogues, and archival records concerning the house's early specialized gear, including hats and motoring goggles.

== Gallery ==
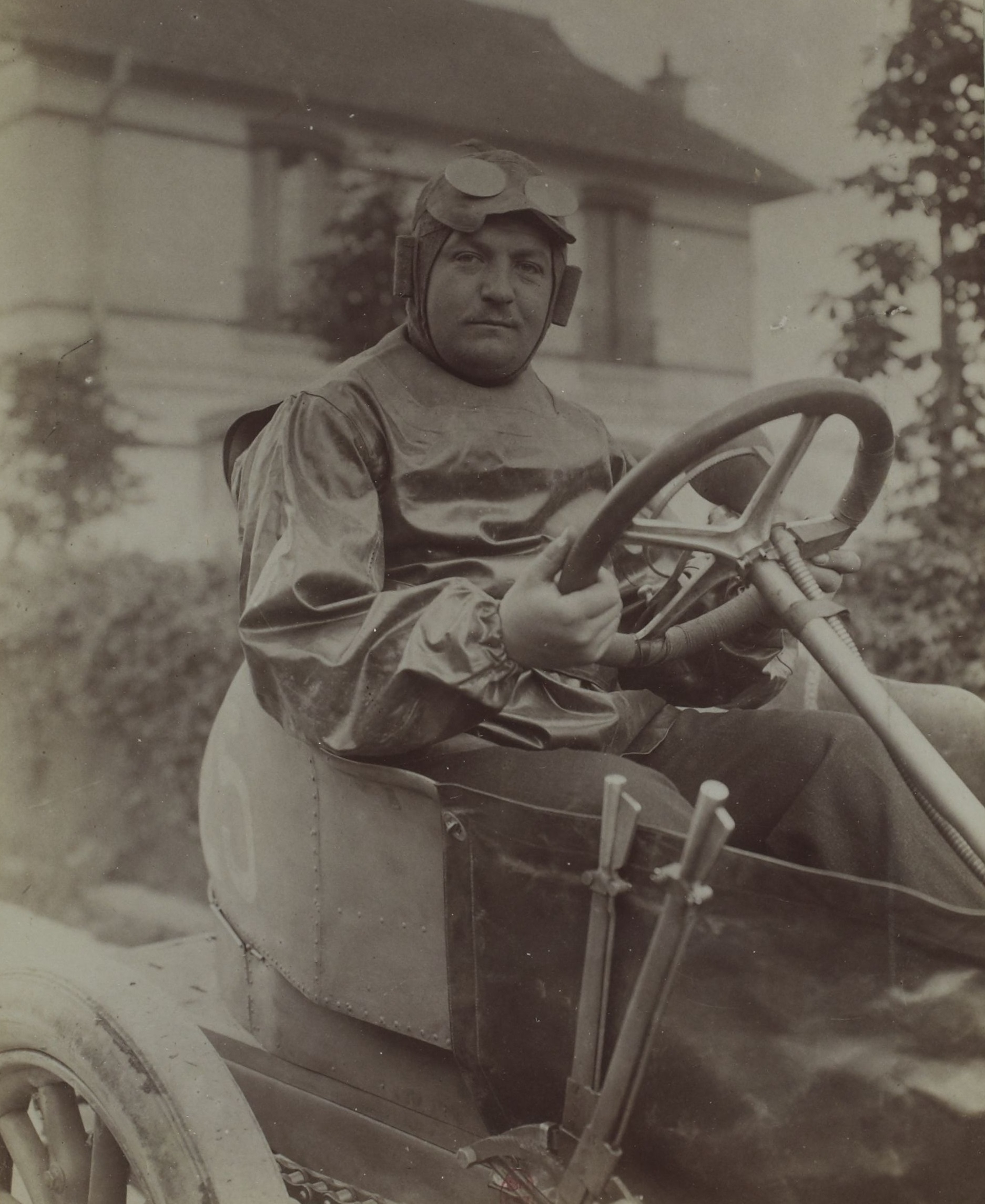
Léon Théry wearing a Ström motoring coat after his 1904 Gordon Bennett Cup victory.

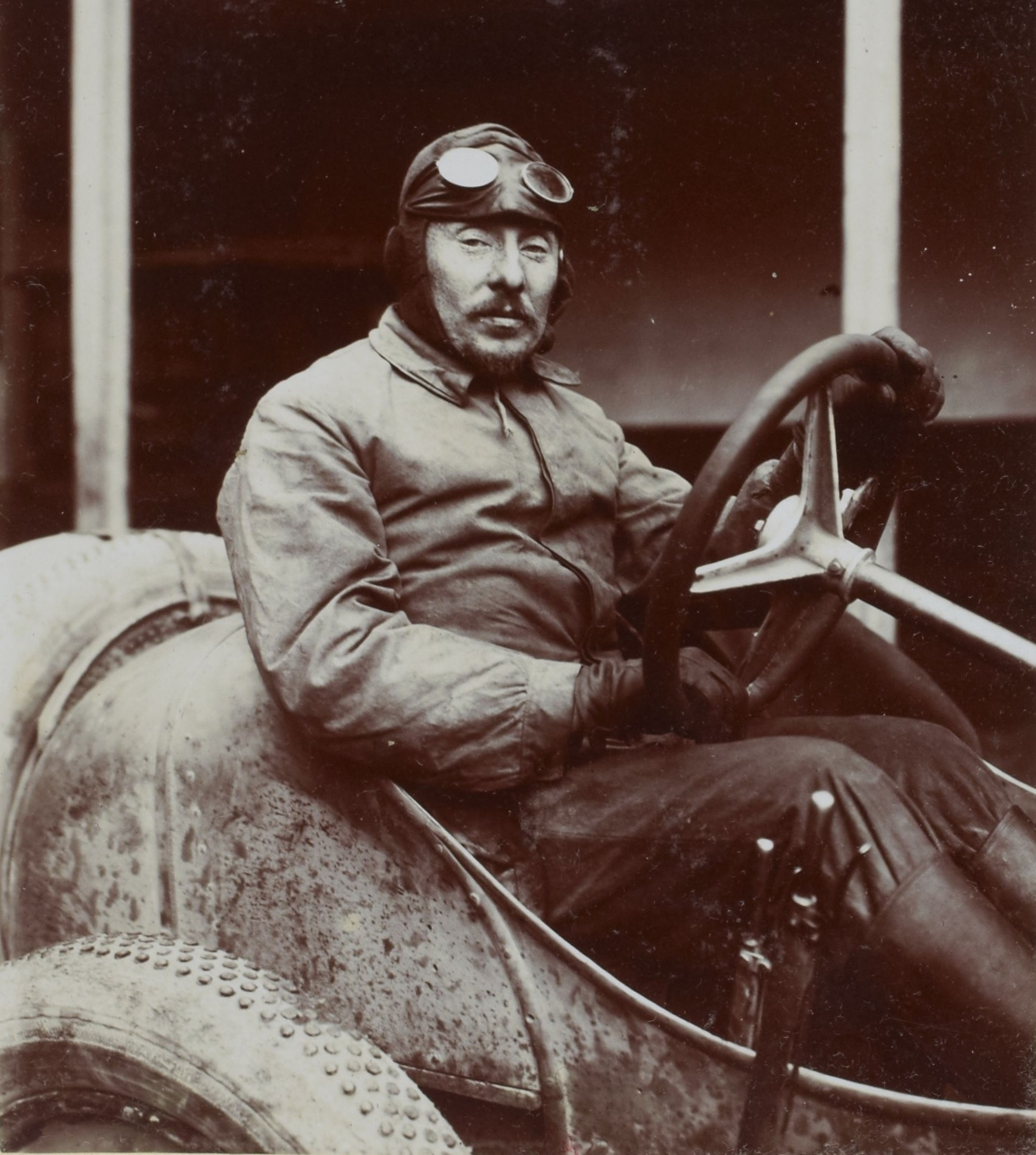
Camille Jenatzy wearing the "Parapluie du Chauffeur" at the 1908 French Grand Prix.

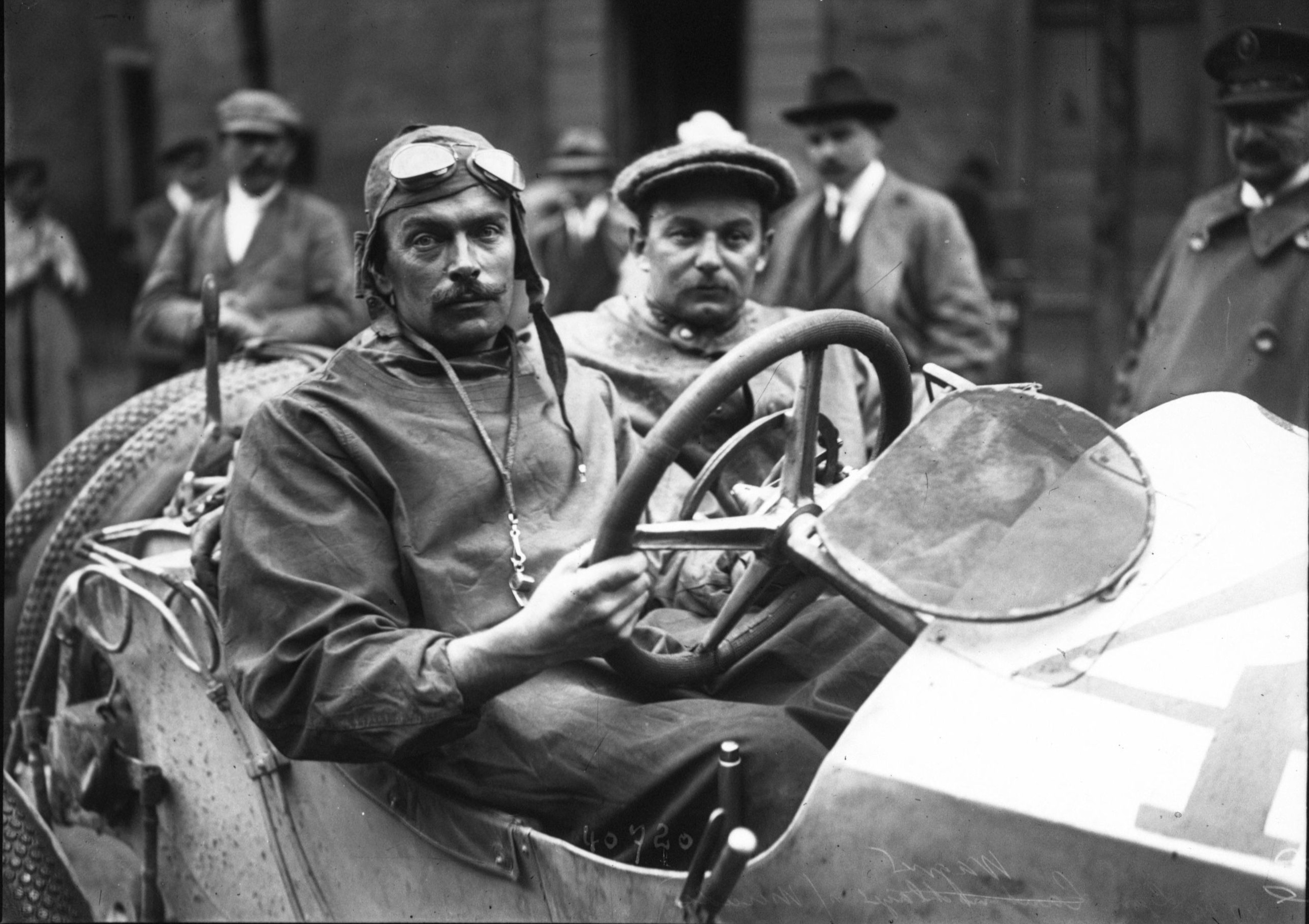
Louis Wagner wearing the "Parapluie du Chauffeur" at the 1914 French Grand Prix.

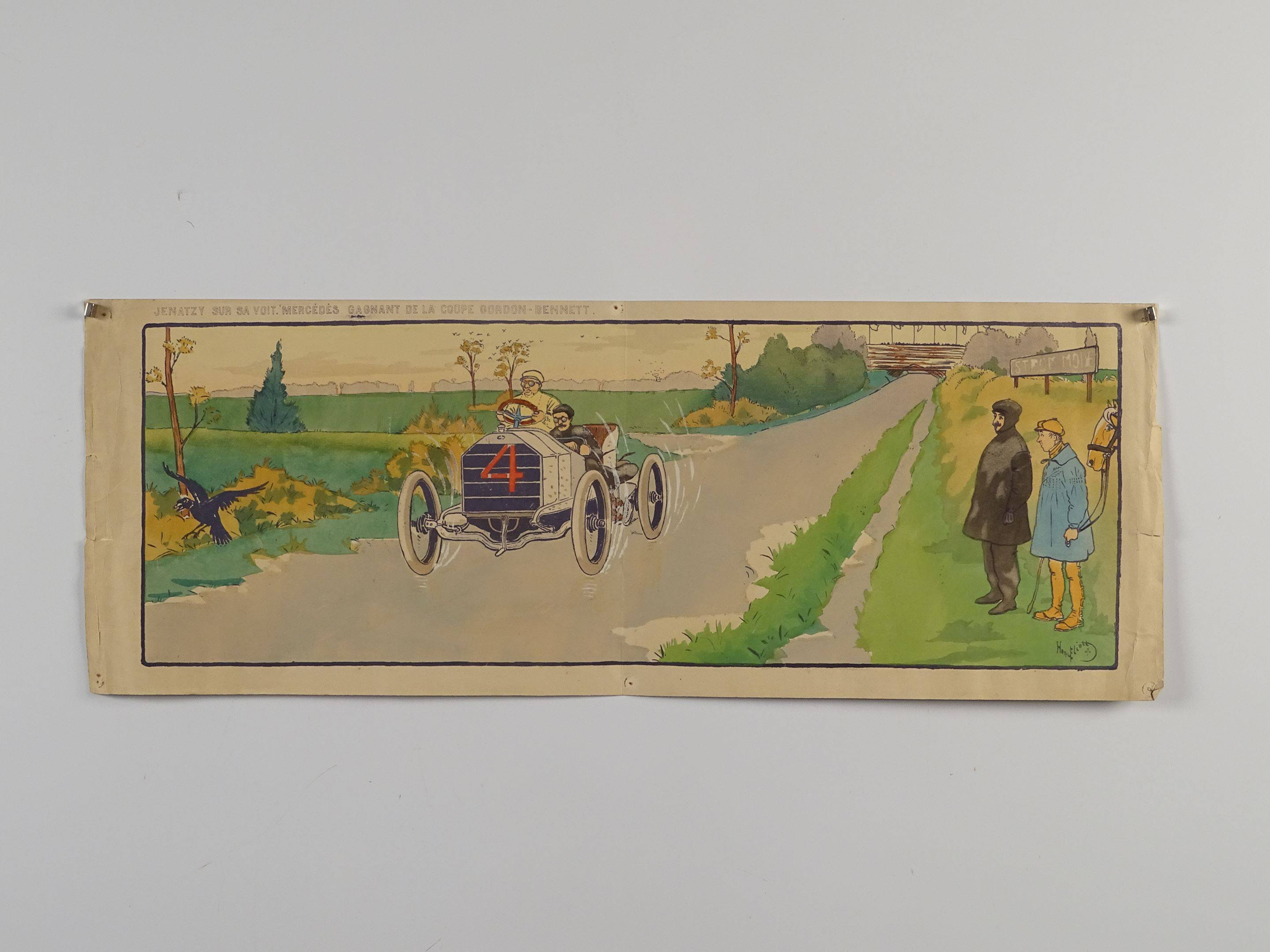
Lithograph by Harry Eliott (c. 1904) featuring spectators near a "STRÖM MODE" sign.

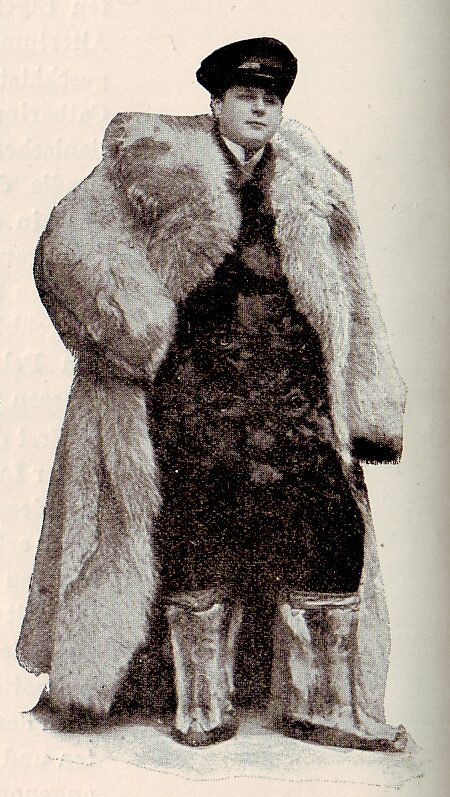
Wolf fur motoring coat crafted by G. A. Ström (1903).

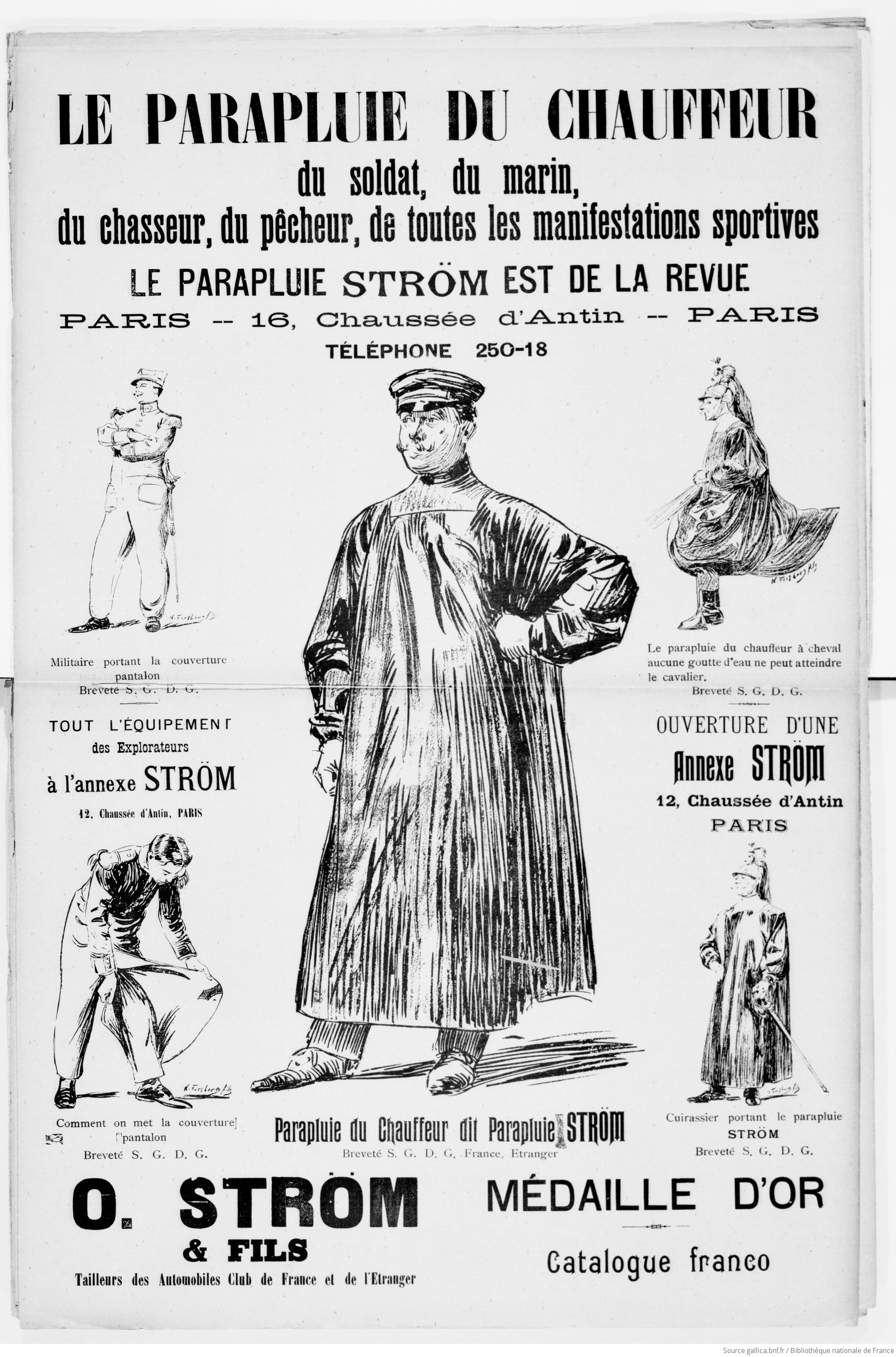
1904 advertisement for the "Parapluie du Chauffeur".

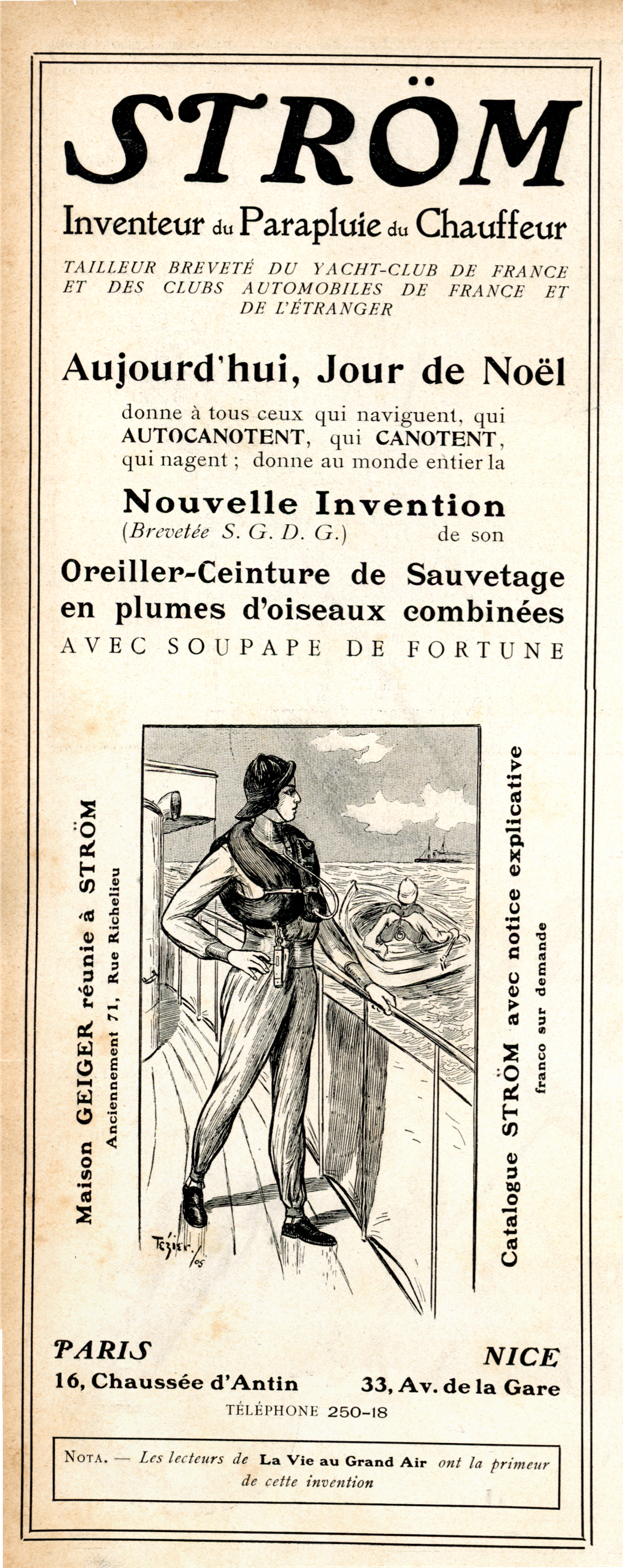
1905 advertisement for the "Life-jacket pillow-belt".

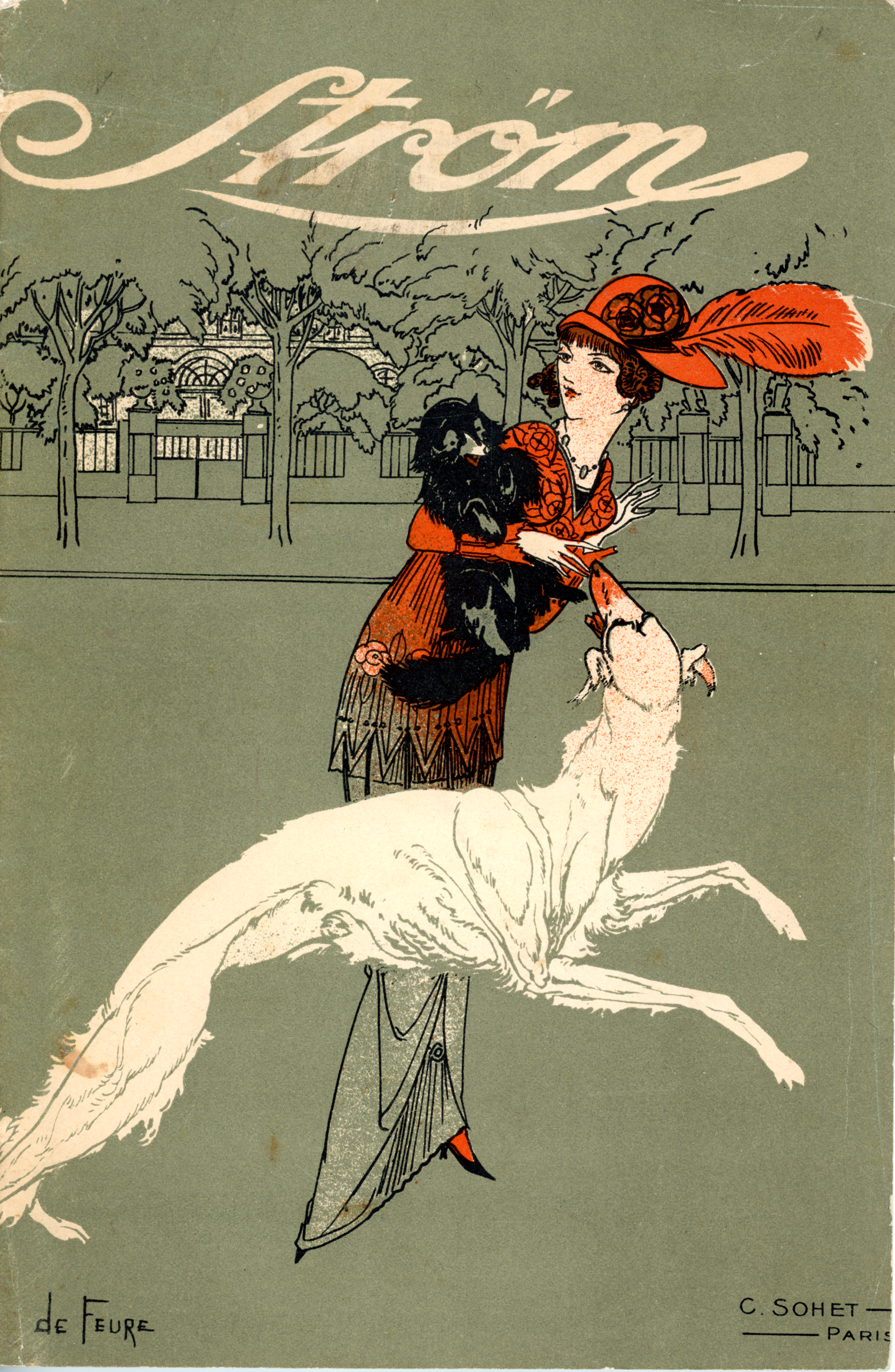
1910s sales catalogue cover featuring an illustration by George de Feure.

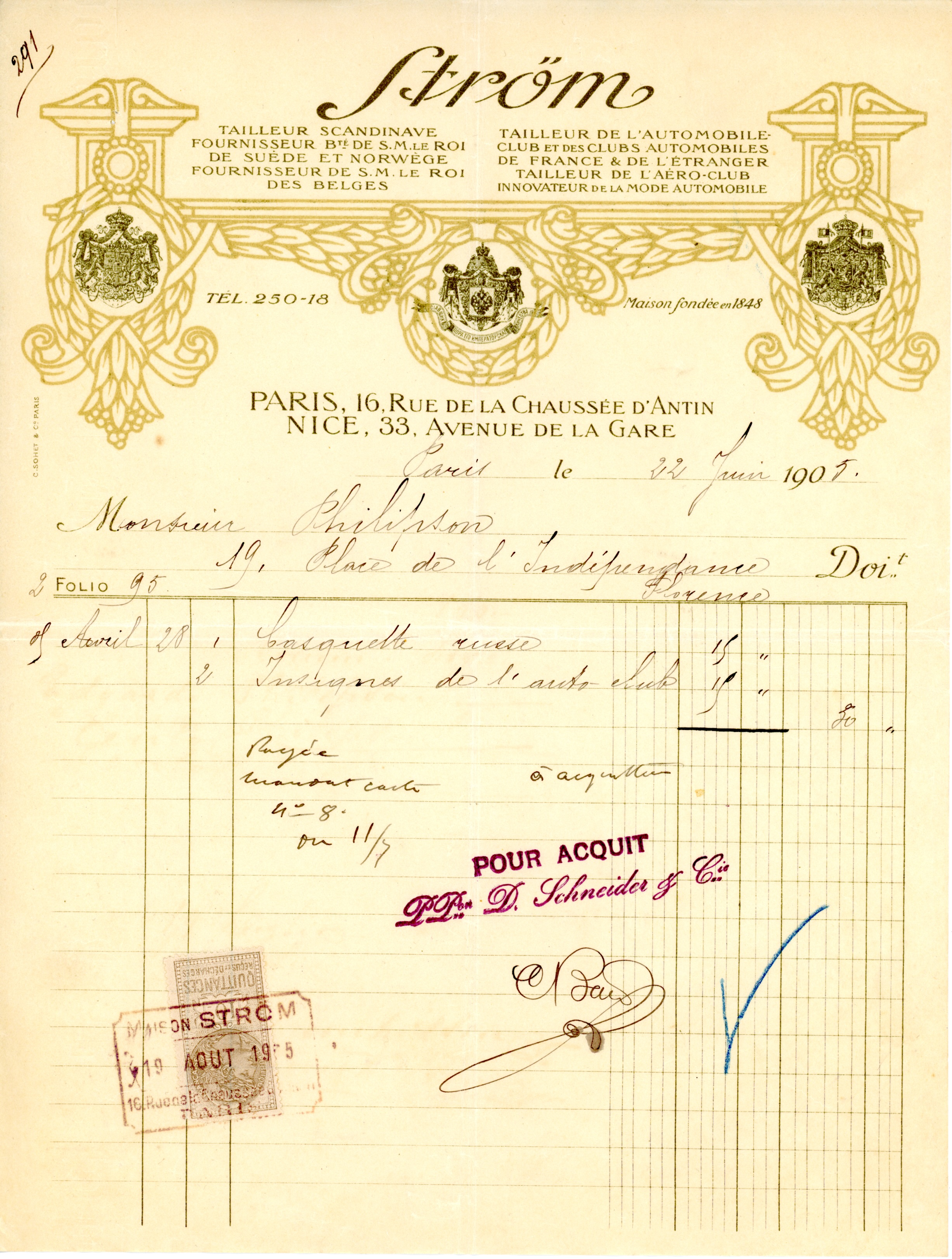
1905 invoice for O. Ström & Fils listing royal warrants.
