= Sens =

Commune in France

- Subprefecture and commune
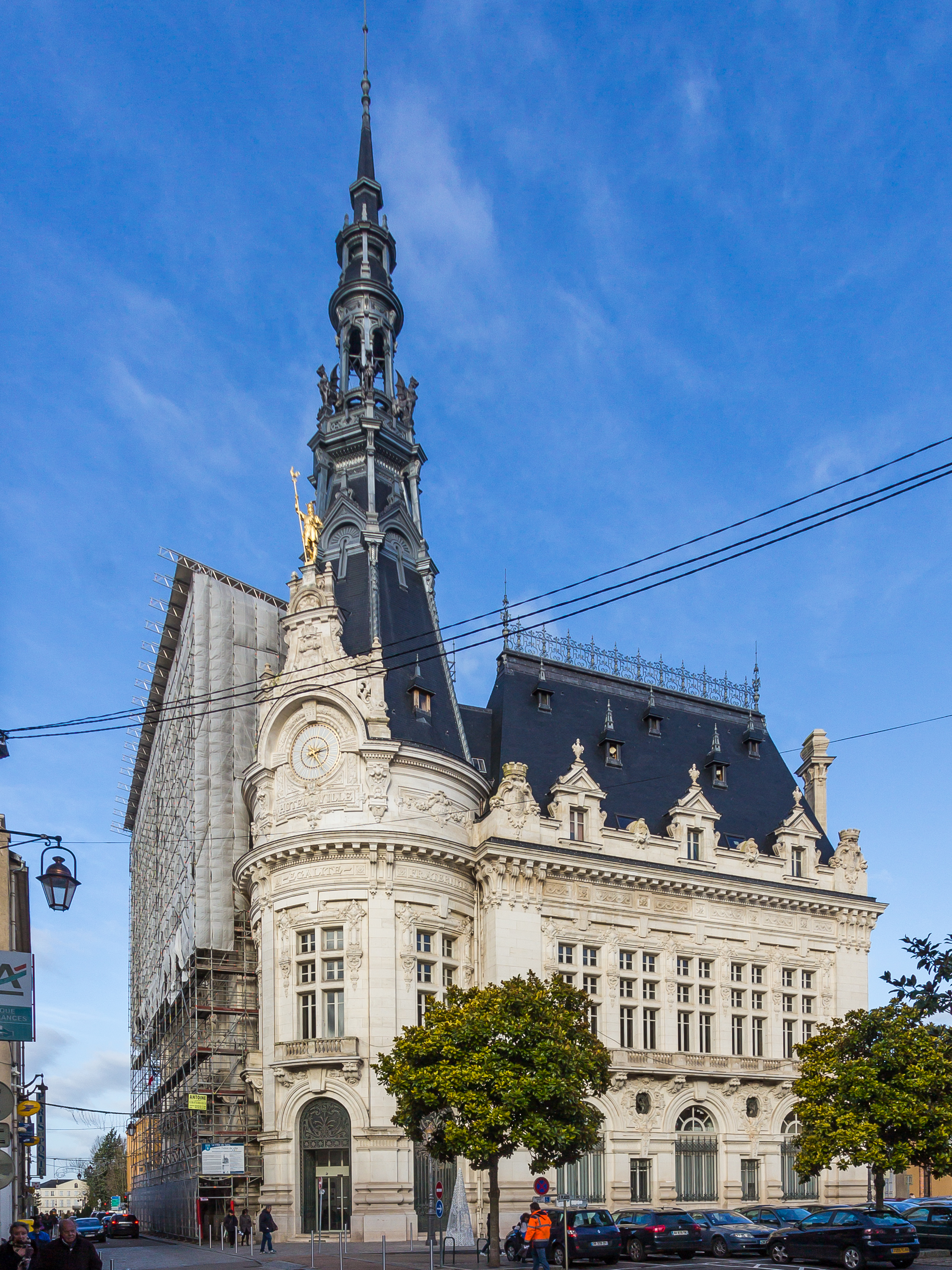
- The Hôtel de Ville

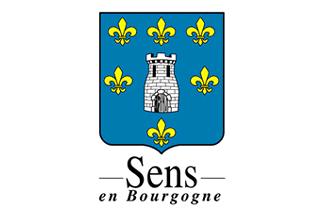
- Flag Coat of arms
- Location of Sens
- Location within France Location within Bourgogne-Franche-Comté
- Coordinates: 48°11′51″N 3°17′16″E
- Country: France
- Region: Bourgogne-Franche-Comté
- Department: Yonne
- Arrondissement: Sens
- Canton: Sens-1 and 2
- Intercommunality: CA Grand Sénonais

Government
  - Mayor (2022–2026): Paul-Antoine de Carville
- Area^{1}: 27.86 km^{2} (10.76 sq mi)
- Population (2023): 27,106
  - Density: 972.9/km^{2} (2,520/sq mi)
- Time zone: UTC+01:00 (CET)
  - Summer (DST): UTC+02:00 (CEST)
- INSEE/Postal code: 89387 /89100
- ^{1} French Land Register data, which excludes lakes, ponds, glaciers > 1 km^{2} (0.386 sq mi or 247 acres) and river estuaries.

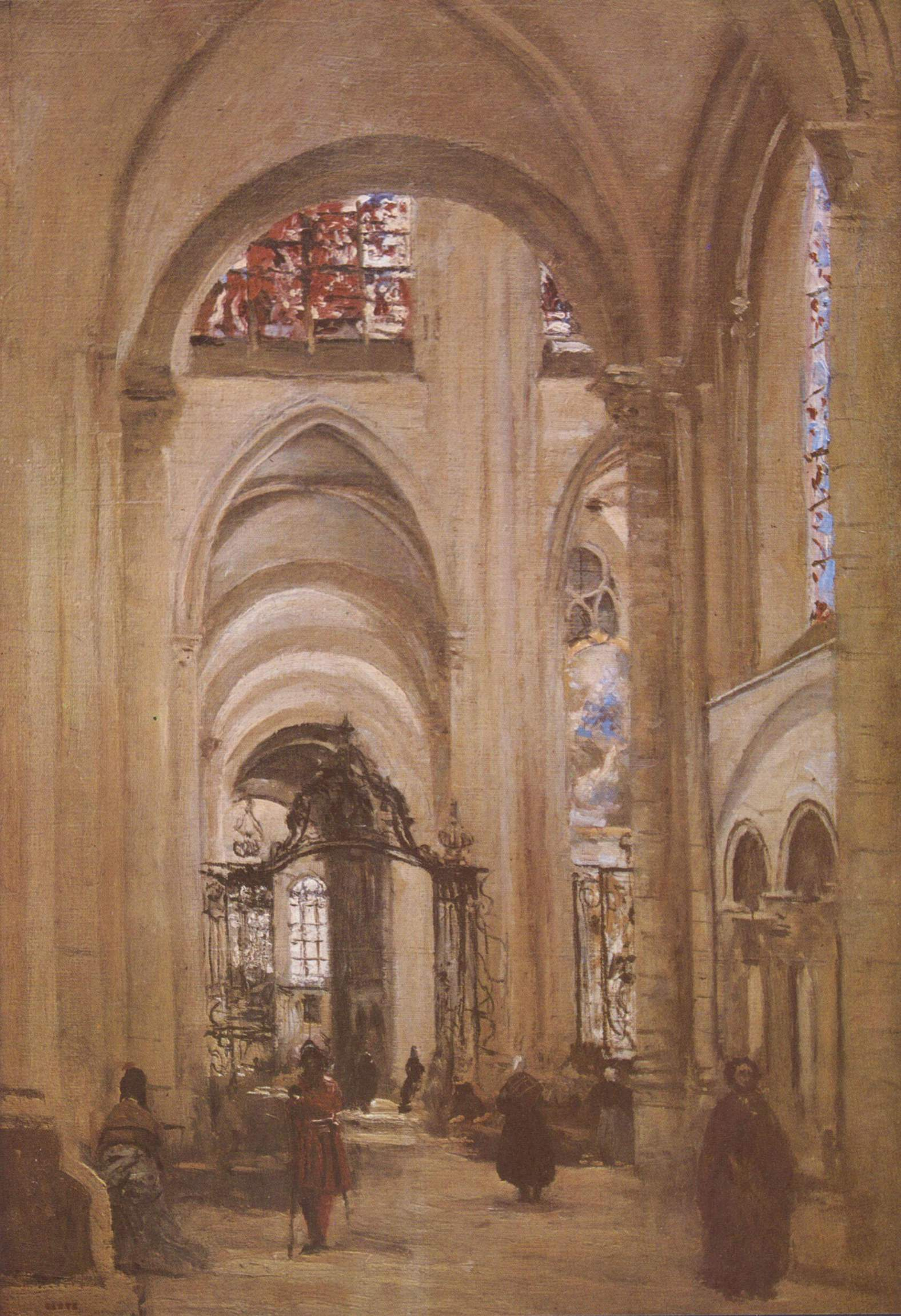
Inside the cathedral of Sens, Jean-Baptiste-Camille Corot, c. 1874

Sens (French pronunciation: [sɑ̃s]) is a commune in the Yonne department in Bourgogne-Franche-Comté in north-central France, 120 km southeast of Paris.

Sens is a sub-prefecture and the second largest city of the department, the eighth largest in the region. It is crossed by the Yonne and the Vanne, which empties into the Yonne here. As of 2023, the municipality had 27,106 inhabitants. Its inhabitants are called les Sénonais in French.

The city was rewarded with the distinction of Grand Prix et quatre fleurs in 2007 at Concours des villes et villages fleuris.

== Geography ==
Sens is located at the extreme north-west of the Bourgogne-Franche-Comté, on the border of three regions, namely the Île-de-France, the Grand Est and the Centre-Val de Loire. Located on the course of the river Yonne in the valley of the same name, the city is bordered by the hills of Paron and Saint-Martin-du-Tertre to the west, extension of the plateau of Gâtinais which also extends to the Loiret. To the east, it is bordered by the forest of Othe which extends over the department of Aube. To the north, the Yonne valley leads to the Brie in Seine-et-Marne.

== History ==
The city is said to have been one of the oppida of the Senones, one of the oldest Celtic tribes living in Gaul. The Battle of the Allia was fought c. 387 BC between the Senones – a Gallic tribe led by Brennus, who had invaded Northern Italy – and the Roman Republic. It is mentioned as Agedincum by Julius Caesar several times in his Commentarii de Bello Gallico. In 53 BC, during the invasion of Gaul, Caesar wintered six legions, at the place called « the camp of Caesar » south of the city. The Roman city was built during the first century BC and surrounded by walls during the third (notable parts of the walls still remain, with alterations along the centuries). It still retains today the skeleton of its Roman street plan. The site was referred to by Ammianus Marcellinus as Senones (oppidum Senonas), where the future emperor Julian faced an Alamannic siege for a few months, but it did not become an administrative center until after the reorganization of the Roman Empire in 375, when it was the chief town of Lugdunensis Quarta.

During the Middle Ages its archbishops held the prestigious role of primate of Gaul and Germany. The bishop of Sens became an archbishop as early as the mid-5th century, but the cult of the traditional founders Savinian and Potentian, not mentioned by Gregory of Tours, did not appear until the 8th century, when they were added to the local recension of the Seventy Apostles. The Hôtel de Sens in Paris was their official residence in that city. The Archdiocese of Sens ruled over the dioceses of Chartres, Auxerre, Meaux, Paris, Orléans, Nevers and Troyes, summarized by the acronym CAMPONT.

Starting from 1135, the cathedral of Sens, dedicated to Saint Stephen, was rebuilt as one of the first Gothic cathedrals. There, in 1234, Louis IX of France celebrated his wedding to Marguerite of Provence. Sens witnessed the trial of Peter Abelard. Pope Alexander III sojourned for some time in the city, and Thomas Becket spent part of his exile between 1162 and 1165. The Archdiocese of Sens hosted a number of church councils and the first Archbishop of Uppsala was consecrated there. William of Sens was the principal architect of Canterbury Cathedral.

Sens experienced troublesome times during the Wars of Religion. In 1562, 100 of the town's Huguenot population were killed in the Massacre of Sens.

The Hôtel de Ville was completed in 1904.

== Population ==
Historical population

Year	Pop.	±% p.a.
1793	10,957	—
1800	9,165	−2.52%
1806	8,675	−0.91%
1821	8,718	+0.03%
1831	9,279	+0.63%
1836	9,095	−0.40%
1841	10,099	+2.12%
1846	10,525	+0.83%
1851	10,645	+0.23%
1856	10,845	+0.37%
1861	11,098	+0.46%
1866	11,901	+1.41%
1872	11,514	−0.55%
1876	12,309	+1.68%
1881	13,515	+1.89%
1886	14,035	+0.76%
1891	14,006	−0.04%
1896	14,924	+1.28%
1901	14,962	+0.05%

Year	Pop.	±% p.a.
1906	15,007	+0.06%
1911	15,034	+0.04%
1921	15,311	+0.18%
1926	16,172	+1.10%
1931	17,465	+1.55%
1936	17,783	+0.36%
1946	17,329	−0.26%
1954	18,612	+0.90%
1962	20,015	+0.91%
1968	23,035	+2.37%
1975	26,463	+2.00%
1982	26,602	+0.07%
1990	27,082	+0.22%
1999	26,904	−0.07%
2007	25,844	−0.50%
2012	25,106	−0.58%
2017	25,935	+0.65%
2023	27,106	+0.74%

Source: EHESS and INSEE (1968-2023)

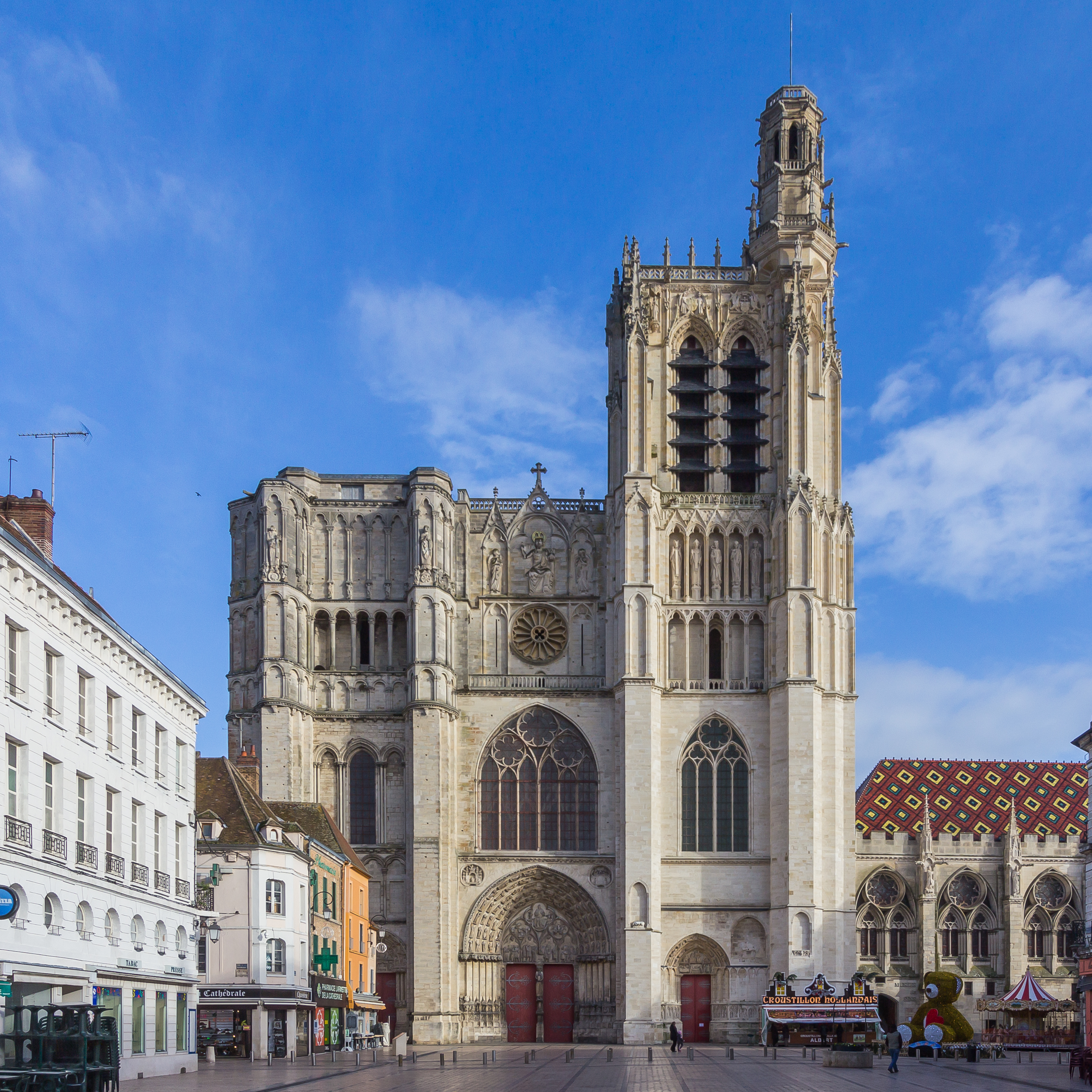
Sens Cathedral

== Main sights ==
- The Cathedral, one of the first Gothic edifices in France
- Archbishops' Palace
- Church of St. Maurice
- Church of St. Pierre le Rond
- House of Abraham
- Museum
- Serres municipales de Sens, municipal greenhouses

== Notable people ==
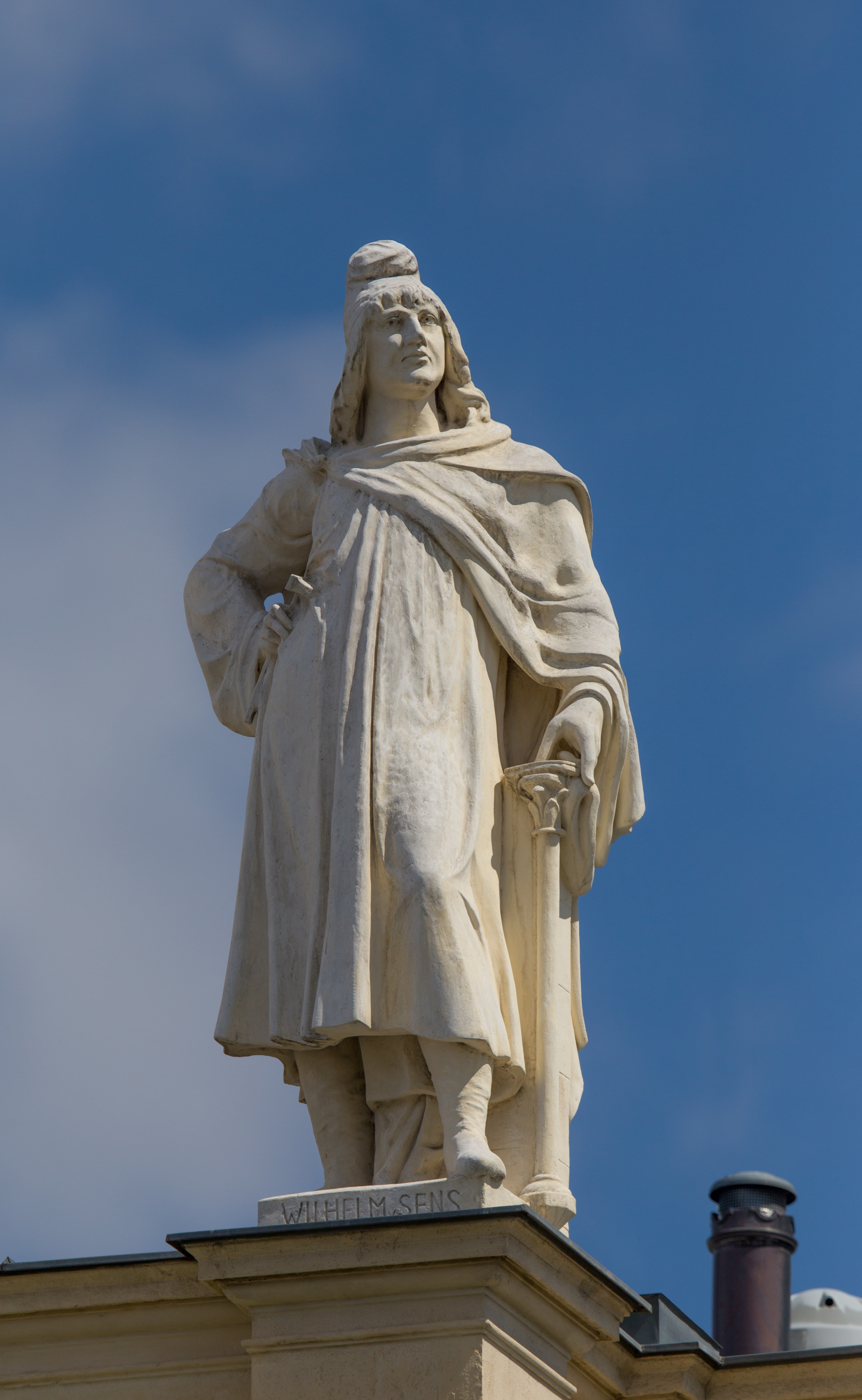
Figure of William of Sens in Vienna

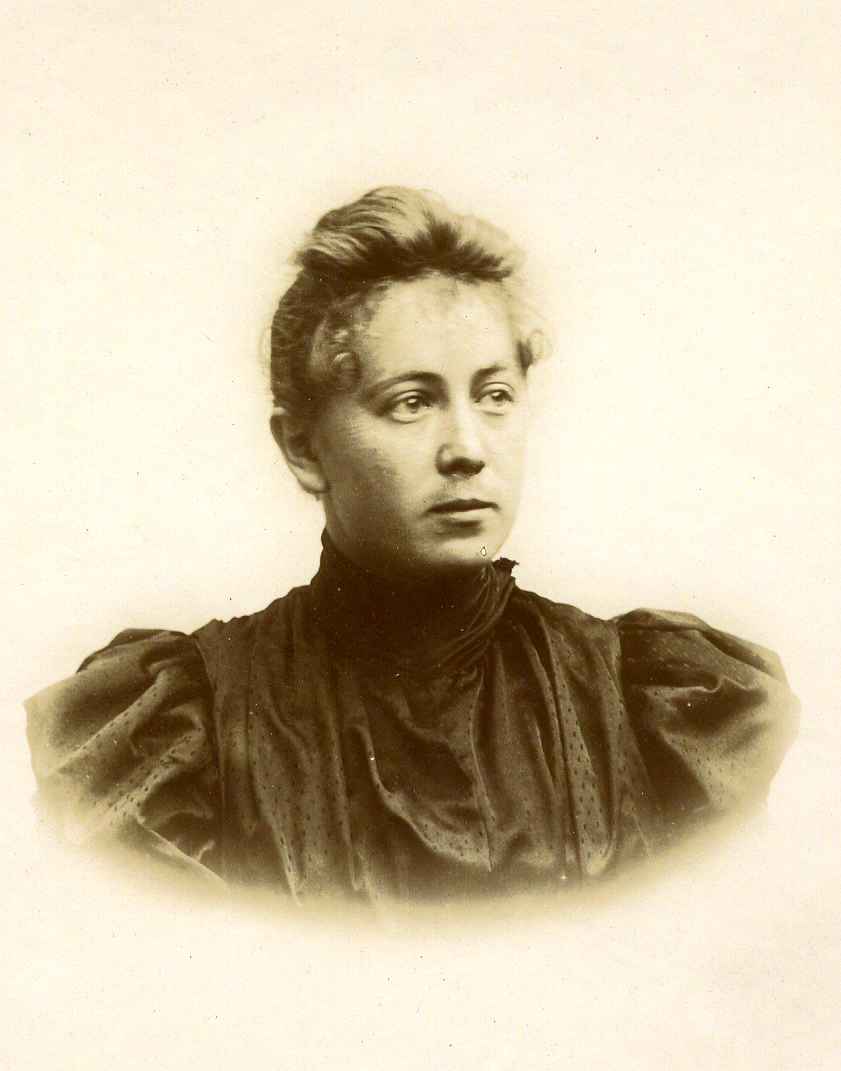
Portrait of Augusta Hure

- Samo (ca.600–ca.658), Frankish merchant and later king (rex) of the 7th century Slavic state known as Samo's Empire
- Aprus of Sens, 7thC French priest and hermit.
- Thomas Becket (ca.1119 – 1170), Archbishop of Canterbury, he took refuge in Sens in 1164, where Pope Alexander III was sheltered; venerated as a saint.
- William of Sens (died 1180) 12thC French master mason and architect
- Samson ben Abraham of Sens (ca.1150 – ca.1230) rabbi and notable Tosafist.
- Joseph ben Nathan Official, 13thC French-Jewish controversialist, probably lived in Sens.
- Jacques Almain (d. 1515), theologian at Collège de Navarre, defended conciliarism
- Jacques-François Courtin (1672–1752) a French Dutch Golden Age painter
- Victor Scipion Charles Auguste de La Garde de Chambonas (1750–1830), mayor of Sens, brigadier general and French foreign minister at the beginning of the French Revolution.
- Louis Antoine Fauvelet de Bourrienne (1769–1834) diplomat, close relationship with Napoleon Bonaparte.
- Louis Jacques Thénard (1777–1857), French chemist, educated at the academy of Sens.
- Édouard Charton (1807–1890), an eminent French literary figure.
- Adolphe Vuitry (1813–1885) lawyer, economist and politician; governor of the Banque de France, 1863/1864
- Charles Levert (1825–1899), French public servant and politician
- Maurice Prou (1861–1930) archivist, paleographer, numismatist and historian.
- Étienne Mimard (1862–1944), French arms manufacturer
- Augusta Hure (1870–1953) the first woman appointed as museum curator in France
- Saturnin Fabre (1884–1961), French film actor.

=== Sport ===
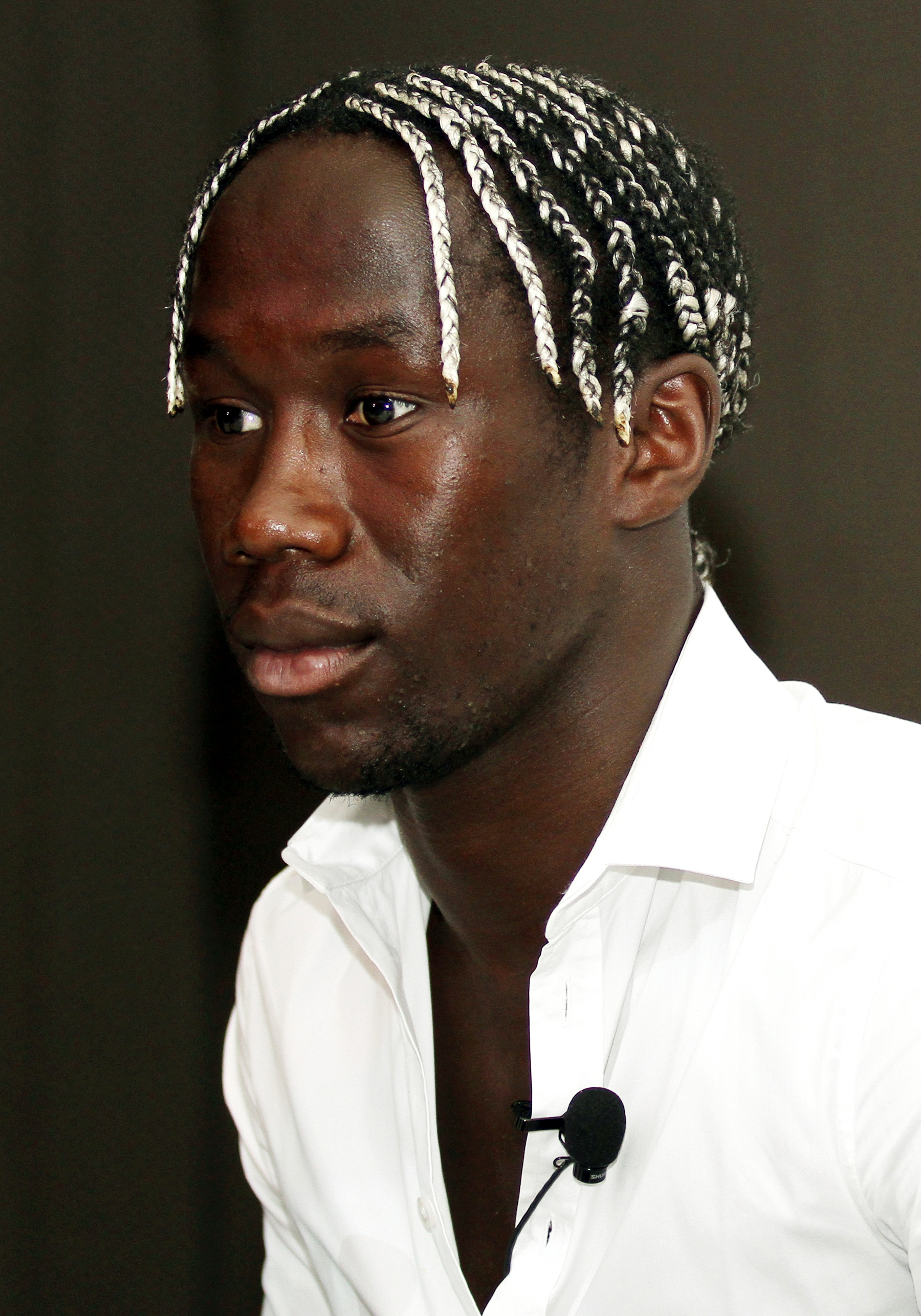
Bacary Sagna, 2012

- Guy Chevalier (1910–1949) field hockey player, competed in the 1928, 1936 & 1948 Summer Olympics.
- Bacary Sagna (born 1983), footballer with 439 club caps and 65 for France.
- Florian Fritz (born 1984) former rugby union player with over 400 club caps and 34 for France.
- Clément Chantôme (born 1987), footballer with about 300 club caps
- Chris Malonga (born 1987), footballer with over 350 club caps and 26 for Congo
- Orlann Ombissa-Dzangue (born 1991) sprinter who specializes in the 100 metres.
- Jean Ambrose (born 1993), footballer with about 70 club caps and 1 for Haiti

== Twin towns ==
- (United Kingdom) Chester, Great Britain
- Lörrach, Loerrach International Germany
- Senigallia, Italy
- Vyshhorod, Ukraine
- Fafe, Portugal

== Climate ==
Climate data for Sens (1991–2020 normals, extremes 1956–present)
Month	Jan	Feb	Mar	Apr	May	Jun	Jul	Aug	Sep	Oct	Nov	Dec	Year
Record high °C (°F)	17.1 (62.8)	22.8 (73.0)	26.8 (80.2)	28.9 (84.0)	35.2 (95.4)	40.6 (105.1)	42.4 (108.3)	40.2 (104.4)	35.8 (96.4)	30.5 (86.9)	23.0 (73.4)	19.6 (67.3)	42.4 (108.3)
Mean daily maximum °C (°F)	7.2 (45.0)	8.7 (47.7)	12.9 (55.2)	16.5 (61.7)	20.2 (68.4)	23.8 (74.8)	26.5 (79.7)	26.4 (79.5)	22.1 (71.8)	17.1 (62.8)	11.1 (52.0)	7.7 (45.9)	16.7 (62.1)
Daily mean °C (°F)	4.4 (39.9)	5.1 (41.2)	8.1 (46.6)	10.9 (51.6)	14.7 (58.5)	18.0 (64.4)	20.2 (68.4)	20.1 (68.2)	16.3 (61.3)	12.6 (54.7)	7.9 (46.2)	5.0 (41.0)	11.9 (53.4)
Mean daily minimum °C (°F)	1.7 (35.1)	1.4 (34.5)	3.3 (37.9)	5.3 (41.5)	9.1 (48.4)	12.2 (54.0)	14.0 (57.2)	13.7 (56.7)	10.5 (50.9)	8.1 (46.6)	4.6 (40.3)	2.3 (36.1)	7.2 (45.0)
Record low °C (°F)	−22.0 (−7.6)	−22.6 (−8.7)	−12.0 (10.4)	−5.6 (21.9)	−3.8 (25.2)	1.7 (35.1)	4.4 (39.9)	3.8 (38.8)	0.3 (32.5)	−3.7 (25.3)	−10.0 (14.0)	−15.6 (3.9)	−22.6 (−8.7)
Average precipitation mm (inches)	50.9 (2.00)	48.4 (1.91)	45.9 (1.81)	52.8 (2.08)	59.6 (2.35)	51.5 (2.03)	55.7 (2.19)	48.3 (1.90)	50.5 (1.99)	63.2 (2.49)	56.3 (2.22)	51.6 (2.03)	644.7 (25.38)
Average precipitation days (≥ 1.0 mm)	10.5	10.2	9.2	9.2	9.9	8.5	7.8	7.8	7.6	9.9	10.6	11.8	112.9
Source: Meteociel

== See also ==
- Senones
- St. Columba of Sens
- Archdiocese of Sens
- Communes of the Yonne department
- St. Wulfram of Sens

== Sources ==
- Kruta, Venceslas (2000). Les Celtes, histoire et dictionnaire : des origines à la romanisation et au christianisme. Robert Laffont. ISBN 2-221-05690-6.
- Treves, Piero (2015). "Brennus (1), Gallic chieftain". Oxford Research Encyclopedia of Classics. doi:10.1093/acrefore/9780199381135.013.1165. ISBN 978-0-19-938113-5.
