= Étienne Mimard =

French arms manufacturer (1862–1944)

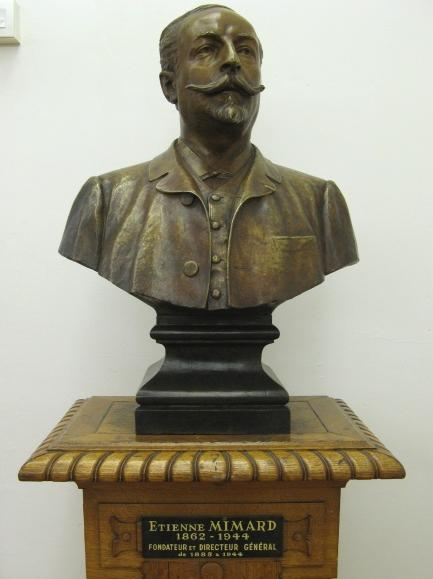
- Bust of Étienne Mimard
- Born: 1862; Sens, France
- Died: 1944 (aged 81–82)
- Occupation: Arms manufacturer
- Known for: Co-founder of Manufacture Française d'Armes et Cycles de Saint-Étienne

Étienne Mimard (1862 in Sens – 1944) was a French arms manufacturer who, with Pierre Blachon, another arms manufacturer, founded the Manufacture Française d'Armes et Cycles de Saint-Étienne, which became Manufrance in 1947.

Some years after buying the Martinier-Collin company, Mimard and Blachon settled on the site in the Cours Fauriel, built by the architect Lamaizière. The list of their innovations is important: they created a large factory, a centre of technical innovation, a novel system of mail order sales (printing of the Manufrance catalogue reached a million copies), a print centre (Le Chasseur français magazine) and made renowned rifles (Robust, Ideal, Simplex, etc.).

== Anecdotes ==
According to legend, Mimard would have wanted to be buried standing up opposite his firm. He was a typical entrepreneur and ideal type of the 19th century. From his office he had a view over all of his factories, and he had modified the keyboards of the firm's typewriters so that typists trained there could not work elsewhere.

== Bibliography ==
- N. Besse, J.-P. Burdy and M. Zancarini, « L’usine modèle de Monsieur Mimard, 1885-1938 », in L’industrie du cycle à Saint-Etienne : mythes et réalités : aspects économiques, techniques, culturels et sociaux, Saint-Etienne, Musée d’art et d’industrie, mission du patrimoine ethnologique, 1984
- Monique Luirard, « Économie et politique nationales : Étienne Mimard et la France de son temps », in Bulletin du Centre d'Histoire Régionale/Université, n° 2, St-Etienne, 1984
