= Huré =

Huré is a French surname. Notable people with the surname include:

- Anne Huré (born 1918; date of death unknown), French writer
- Antoine Huré (1873–1949), French general
- Benoît Huré (born 1953), French politician
- Francis Huré (1916–2021), French diplomat and writer
- Jean Huré (1877–1930), French organist and composer
- Marguerite Huré (1895–1967), French stained glass artist

== See also ==
- Augusta Hure (1870–1953), French museum curator
