= Le Chasseur français =

French hunting magazine

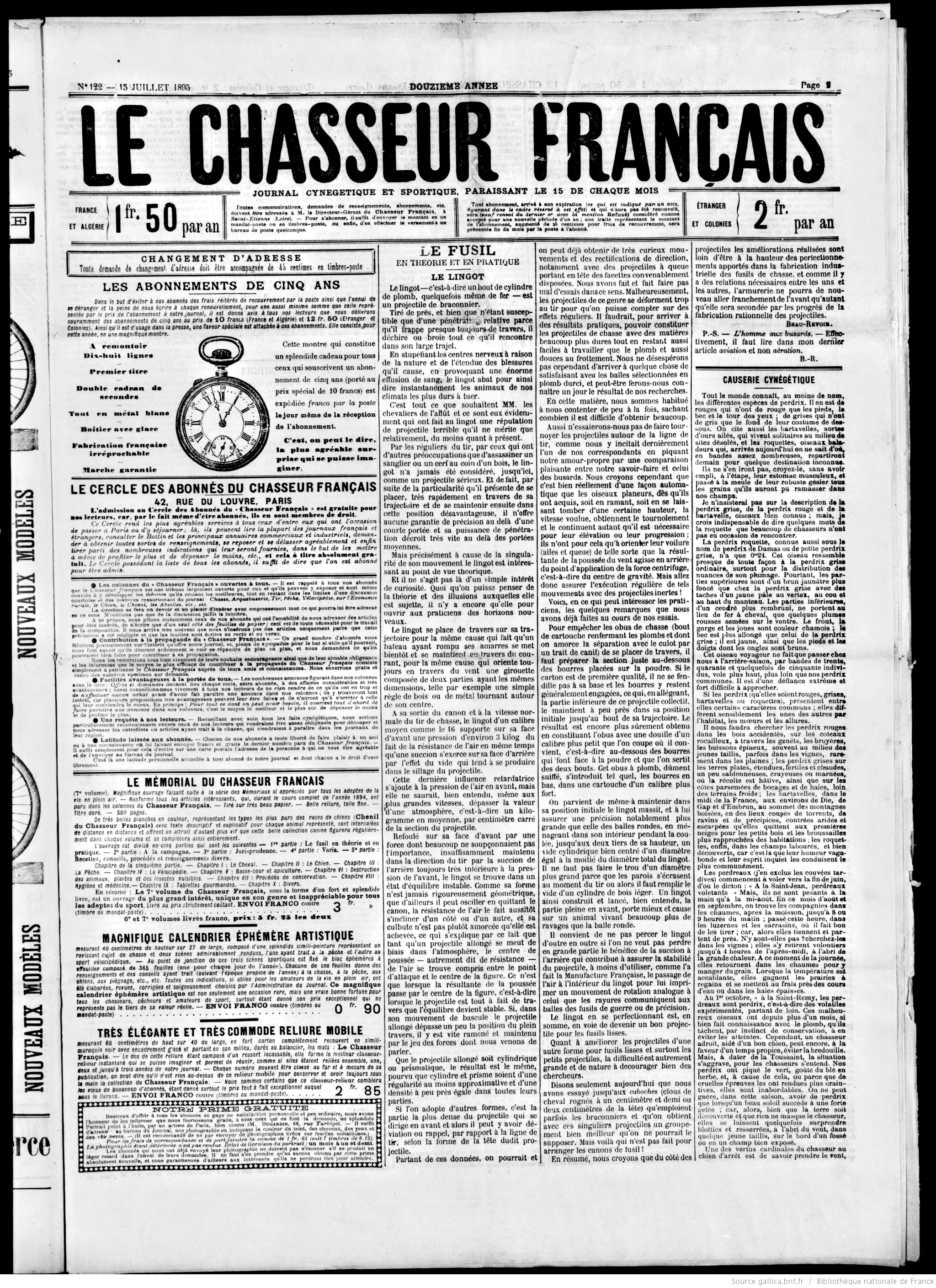
- Cover of the 15 July 1895 edition.
- Editor: Antoine Berton
- Categories: Hunting magazine; Nature magazine
- Frequency: Monthly
- Circulation: 215,836 (2019)
- Publisher: Mondadori/EMAP France
- Founder: ManuFrance
- Founded: 1885; 140 years ago
- Company: Mondadori
- Country: France
- Language: French
- Website: Le Chasseur français
- ISSN: 2119-2073

Le Chasseur français (French: The French Hunter) is a monthly magazine on hunting and nature published in France. Launched in 1885 it is one of the earliest magazines in this category.

== History and profile ==
Le Chasseur français was started in 1885. The founding company of the magazine was ManuFrance, which went bankrupt in the 1980s. The company was founded by Étienne Mimard and Pierre Blachon in St Etienne and had activities in various business fields.

In 1990 Medianature, a joint company formed by Bayard SA and Emap, acquired the magazine. In 2001 Emap bought the shares of Bayard AS in Medianature, becoming the owner of the magazine. Mondadori is also owner of the magazine, which acquired shares of it in June 2001. In June 2006 the company became the whole owner of the magazine.

Le Chasseur français is published by Mondadori/Emap France on a monthly basis. The magazine offers articles about nature-related hobbies such as fishing, gardening, hunting, mushroom gathering and farm animal husbandry. It supports for positivism, work and production. Antoine Berton is the editor of the monthly.

== Circulation ==
The circulation of Le Chasseur français was about 544,000 copies during the first half of 2001 and 535,000 copies in 2001. It was one of the 20 best-selling magazines in France in 2005 with a circulation of 494,514 copies. The magazine had a circulation of 384,057 copies in 2010. In 2012 the magazine sold 303,380 copies. The magazine sold 215,836 copies in 2019.
