= Alfred Velghe =

French racing driver (1870–1904)

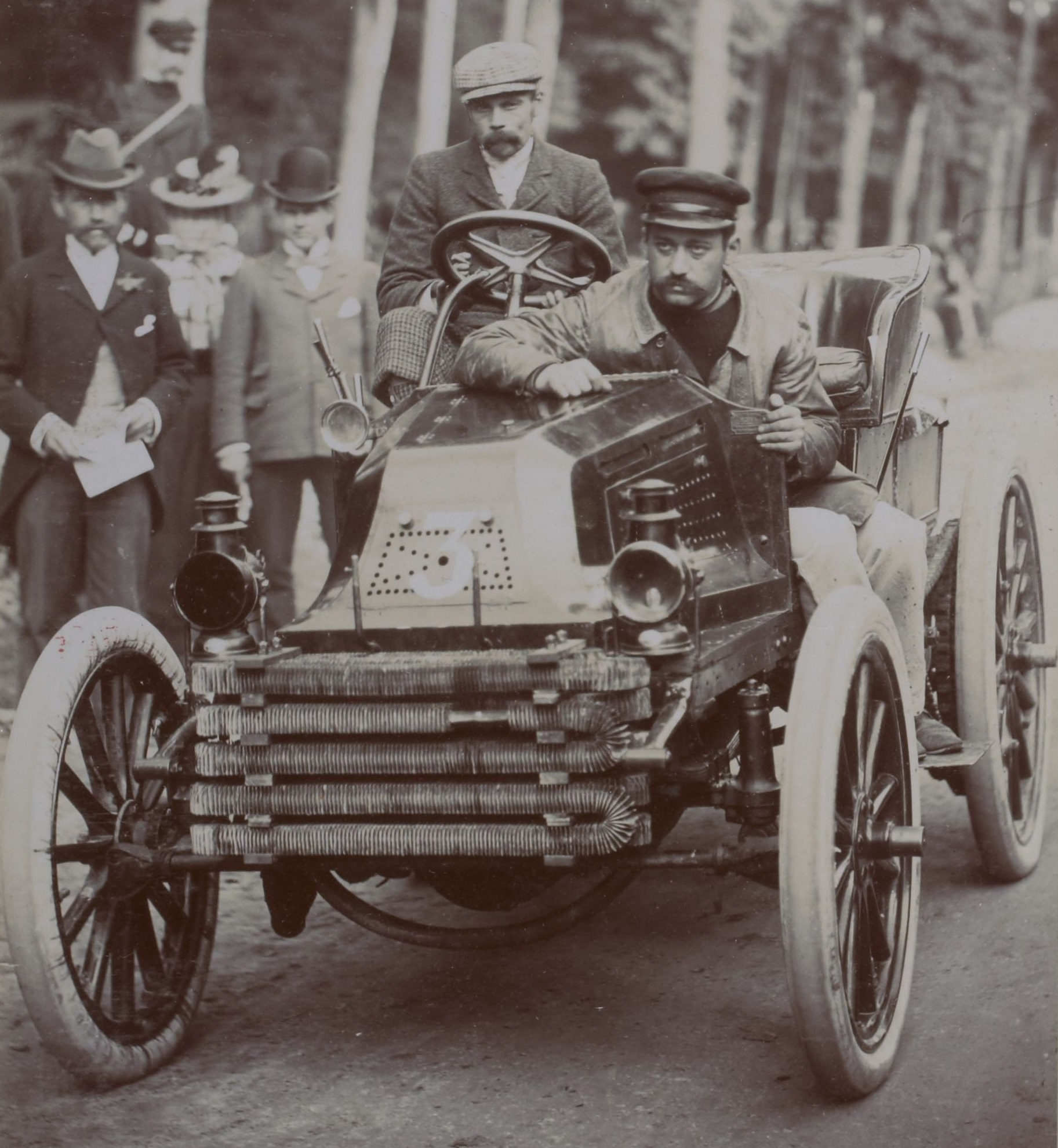
Velghe in 1899

Alfred Velghe (16 June 1870 – 29 February 1904) was a Belgian-French pioneer of motor racing and cycling who competed under the pseudonym Levegh, an anagram of his surname.

== Early career and cycling ==
Before transitioning to motor racing, Velghe was a competitive cyclist during the early 1890s. Competing under the name Levegh, he achieved several podium finishes in French regional races, including a victory in the Compiègne-Pierrefonds in 1891.

== Motor racing career ==
Velghe began automobile racing in 1898 and quickly became a prominent driver for the Mors racing stable. He was considered one of the leading drivers of the era, frequently rivaling dominant figures such as René de Knyff and Fernand Charron.

=== Major victories and records ===
On 1 October 1899, Levegh won a 232 km race between Bordeaux and Biarritz driving a Mors. His most significant career victory came in the 1,348 km Paris–Toulouse–Paris race, held in 1900 as an unofficial Olympic sport. He won the "Large Car" class with a time of 20h 50' 9".

In the autumn of 1902, Velghe set a land speed record of 123 km/h and reportedly set a record for the mile in the United States.

=== Gordon Bennett Cup ===
Velghe represented France in the Gordon Bennett Cup in 1900 and 1901. In the 1901 race, held concurrently with the Paris–Bordeaux event, he was a favorite for the Mors stable but was forced to retire after his car struck a drainage ditch (caniveau), causing terminal damage to the vehicle.

== Personal life ==
Originally from Courtrai, Belgium, Velghe was the son of Pierre Corneille Velghe, an antiques dealer based in Paris. He was the nephew of three Belgian painters: Jean Constant Velghe, Auguste Velghe, and Aimé Velghe. Initially intending to follow an artistic path himself, Velghe was a pupil of Henri Laurent-Desrousseaux and exhibited genre scenes at the Paris Salon in 1886, 1888, and 1890.

Velghe was the brother-in-law of Gustave Adolphe Ström, a director of the Parisian tailoring house Ström. The relationship was established through Gustave Ström's marriage to Velghe's sister, Alice Pauline Louise Velghe, on 16 February 1892. This familial tie deeply integrated the Ström house into the early European motorsport circuit, leading the firm to become a primary supplier of technical attire and equipment for the Automobile Club de France and the Aéro-Club de France.

== Death and legacy ==
Velghe's career was cut short by illness. Following his major racing successes, he suffered from persistent health issues, often identified as tuberculosis or chronic fluid accumulation (hydropisie). He died in Pau, France, on 29 February 1904, at the age of 33.

His nephew, Pierre Levegh (born Pierre Bouillin), adopted the pseudonym "Levegh" in his honor when he began his own racing career in the 1930s.
