= Hôtel de Ville, Sens =

Town hall in Sens, France

Hôtel de Ville
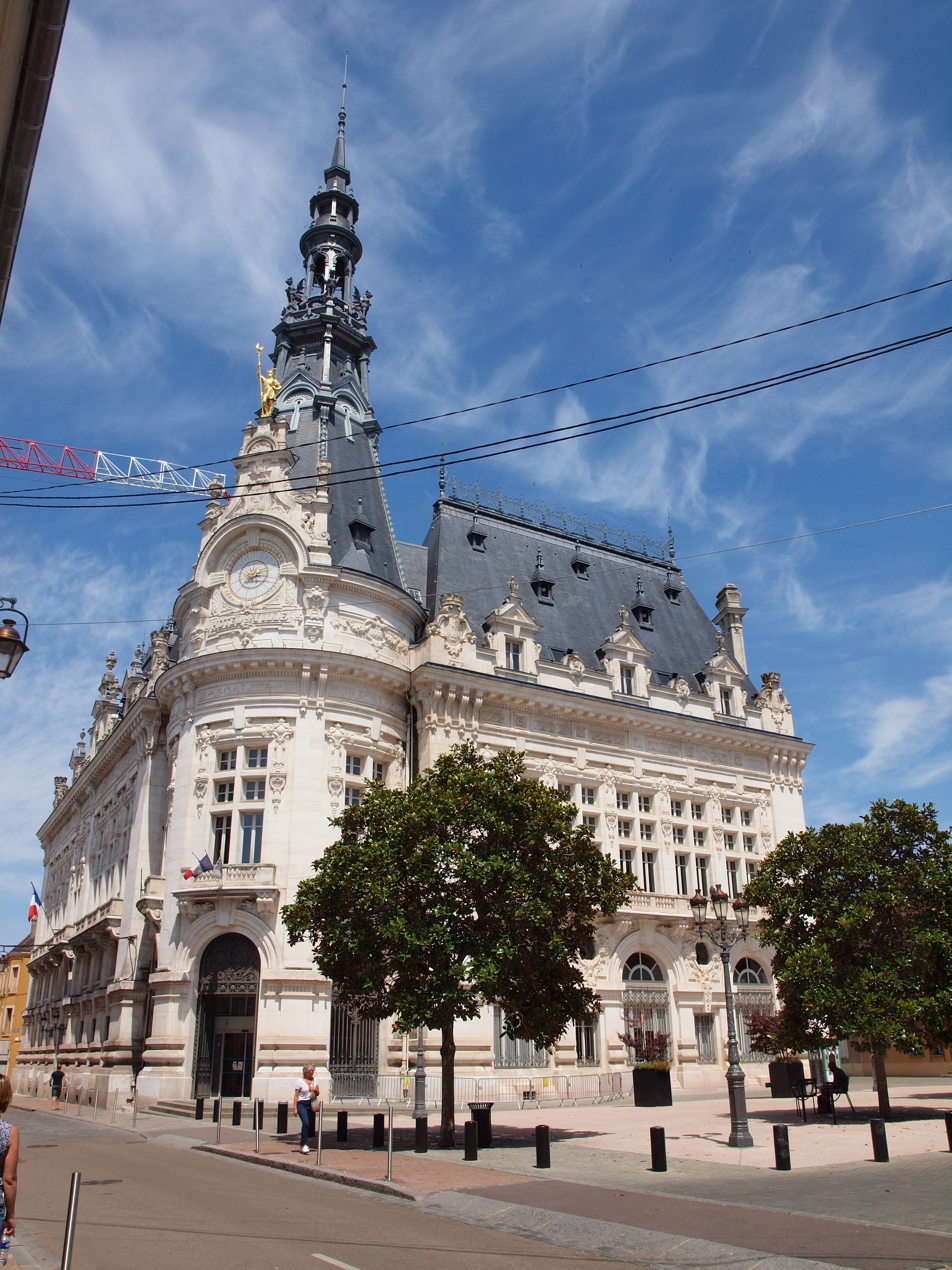
- The main frontage of the Hôtel de Ville in July 2023

General information
- Type: City hall
- Architectural style: French Renaissance style
- Location: Sens, France
- Coordinates: 48.1988°N 3.2828°E
- Completed: 1904

Design and construction
- Architects: Joseph Dupont and Jules Poivert

Monument historique
- Official name: Hôtel de ville
- Type: Inscrit
- Designated: 1995
- Reference no.: PA00113862

The Hôtel de Ville (French pronunciation: [otɛl də vil], City Hall) is a municipal building in Sens, Yonne, in northern France, standing on Rue de la République. It was designated a monument historique by the French government in 1995.

== History ==
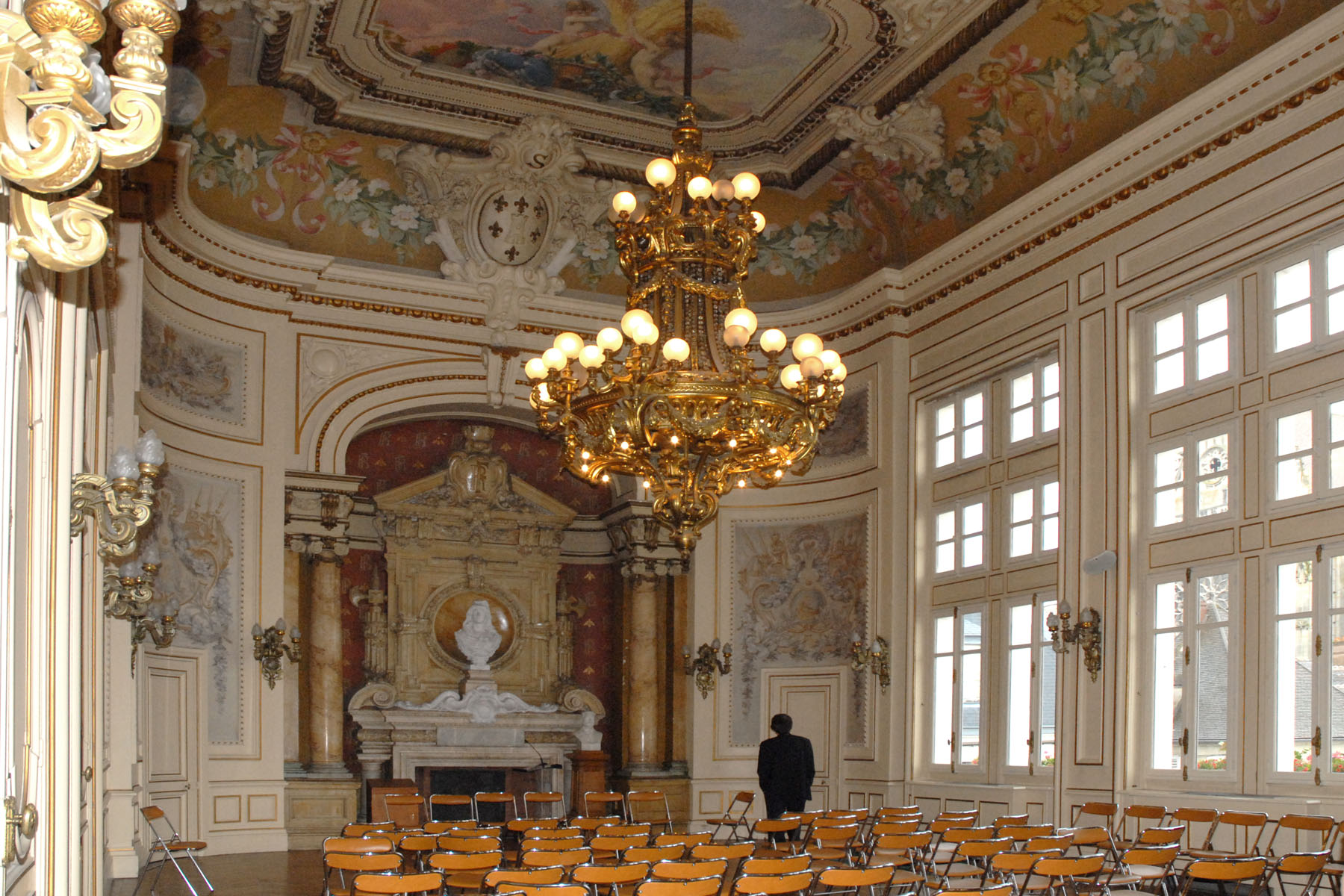
The Salle des Fêtes

Under the ancien régime, the consuls met in a variety of buildings in the town including a room on the upper floor of Porte Saint-Pregts (Saint-Pregts' Gate) on Rue de la République from around 1285, a hall in the Palais du Koi on Rue du Palais de Justice from around 1300, a room in the Maison Quatre-Mares on Boulevard du Quatorze Juillet from 1373, the Hôtel des Tournelles on Rue d'Alsace-Lorraine from 1570, No. 66 Rue Thénard from 1615, and then the buildings of the Grand Seneca on Grande-Rue from 1780.

Following the French Revolution, the new town council initially occupied a room in the archbishop's palace. However, in the early 19th century, the town council decided to acquire a dedicated building. The building they selected was the Hôtel Vezou on Rue Rigault. The building had been commissioned by the lieutenant general of the bailiwick, Palamedes de Foudriat. It was designed in the neoclassical style, built in ashlar stone, and had been completed in about 1650.

The building was laid out as a typical hôtel particulier with a grand gate, a grand courtyard and two ornate façades. The grand gate was designed in the baroque style with huge doors featuring lions' heads and a tympanum containing a cartouche surrounded by garlands. It was sold to a wealthy merchant, François Vezou, in the late 17th century and then, after being sold to a royal advisor in 1737, it hosted the Turkish ambassador, Zaid Effendi, in 1741. It went on to be used as a local tax collection office before being acquired by the council in 1822. It also accommodated the local museum from 1844 until the museum relocated to the Petit Hôtel-Dieu in 1891. After the building was no longer required for municipal use, it became the Centre de recherche et d'études du patrimoine (Center for research and studies of heritage).

In the late 19th century, following significant population growth, the council decided to commission a purpose-built town hall. The site they selected, on the corner of Rue de la République and Place Drapés, was occupied by the Maison Lorne which was duly demolished in 1900. The foundation stone for the new building was laid by the mayor, Lucien Cornet, on 21 April 1901. The building was designed by Joseph Dupont and Jules Poivert in the French Renaissance style, built in ashlar stone at a cost of FFr 903,844 and, after some construction difficulties, was officially opened by the politician, Camille Pelletan, on 3 April 1904.

The design involved a huge circular tower on the corner of the two streets. There was a round headed doorway with an archivolt and a keystone on the ground floor, a tall mullioned and transomed window on the first floor and a clock surmounted by a copper statue depicting a Gaul at roof level. Behind the clock, there was a steep roof surmounted by a belfry. The façade of seven bays on Rue de la République was fenestrated by casement windows with keystones on the ground floor, by tall mullioned and transomed windows on the first floor, and by dormer windows at attic level, while the façade of five bays on Place Drapés was fenestrated by round headed windows with archivolts and keystones on the ground floor, by tall mullioned and transomed windows on the first floor, and by dormer windows at attic level. Internally, the principal rooms were the Salle du conseil (council chamber), the Salle des Mariages (wedding room) and the Salle des Fêtes (ballroom).

The French artist Jean-Jacques Scherrer painted two large frescos entitled "La remise de la Chartre émancipant la Commune" (The Presentation of the Charter Emancipating the Commune) and "Le Mariage de la Rosière" (the Marriage of the Rose Queen). The wall panels and overdoors were painted by Auguste Mangonot while the ceilings were painted by Emmanuel Cavaillé-Coll.
