= Church of St. Pierre le Rond, Sens =

Coordinates: 48°11′47″N 3°16′53″E

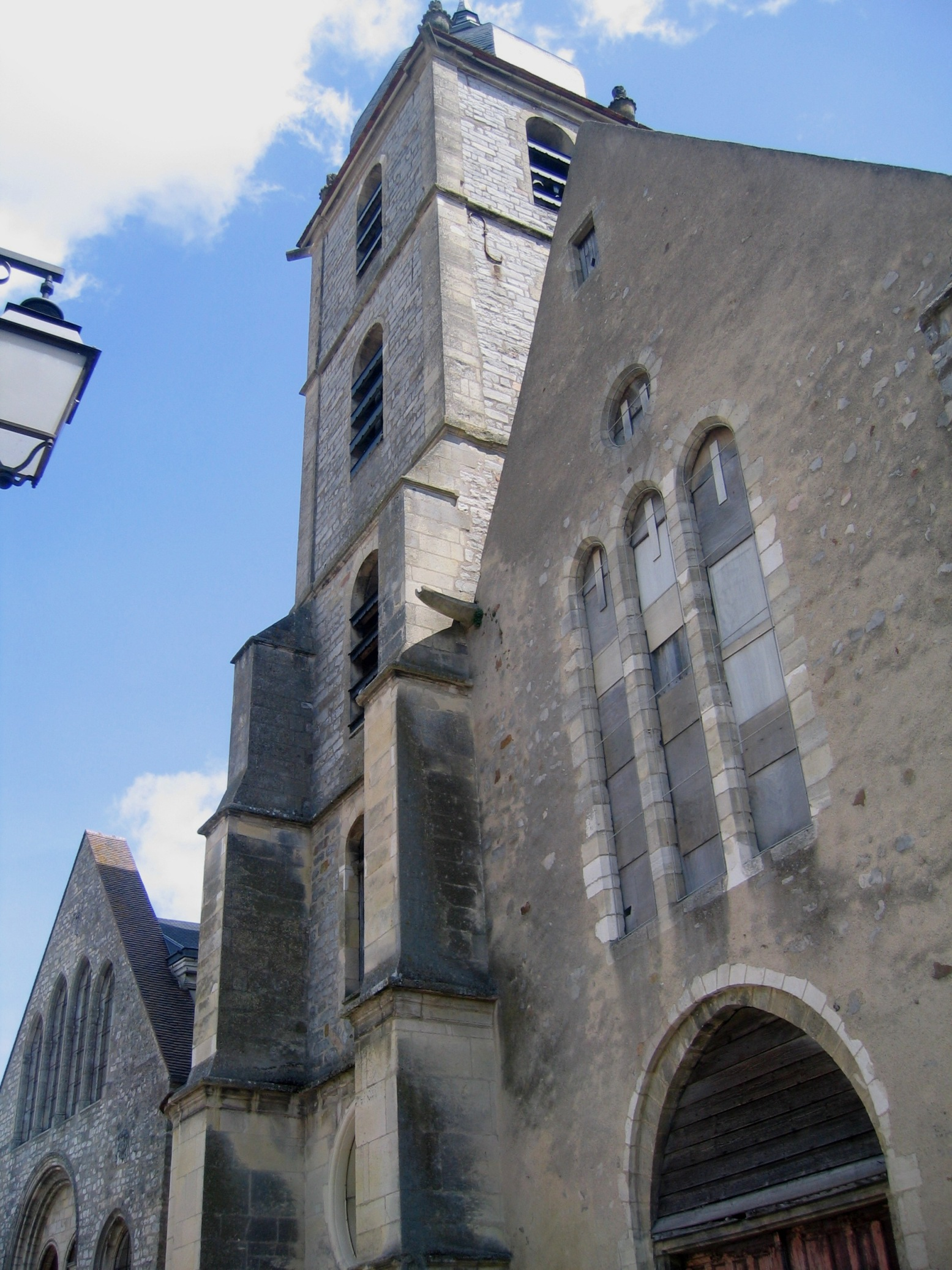
Facade and bell tower.

The church of St. Pierre le Rond is a Catholic church in Sens, Yonne, at 115 kilometers South West from Paris. It is dedicated to Saint Peter and is a church of the Archdiocese of Sens-Auxerre.

== History ==
The church was founded in 13th century. Le Rond means 'round' from the shape of the bell tower which was elevated in 1728. In 1791, one of the bells was given to St. Florence's Church in Paron. At the time of the French Revolution, the priest escaped from the church, disguised as a carter. Two citizens from Sens, Macé and Thomas, managed to buy the church and so saved the building from revolutionary fury. They said to authorities that they would transform it as a fodder barn. In fact they saved all the stained glass windows and furniture. After the Revolution, they sold it back to the priest, Fr. Rupier, who gave it to the Cathedral of Sens in 1797. The church was consecrated and restored. In 1965 after Vatican II, the church was closed and never re-opened. Today it is in a desperate state. It has been registered since 1965 as a monument historique.

== Architecture ==
The large nave dates from the 14th century and the North aisle from the beginning of the Renaissance (end of 15th century). The woodwork and the altarpiece go back to 16th century, so does the framing of the vaulted nave. Some pieces of furniture are registered into Monuments historiques, such as an Entombment of Christ, the 18th-century grilles, one statue of St. Roman (bishop of Auxerre in 6th century) and another of St. Bernard, the Renaissance stained glass windows (some created by Jean Cousin the Elder), one statue of St. Anne in stone, a bas-relief of St. Hubertus. The stalls are from 16th century. Two paintings are remarkable, one with St. Peter freed by angels and another Madonna with a dove. Other paintings show the Evangelists.

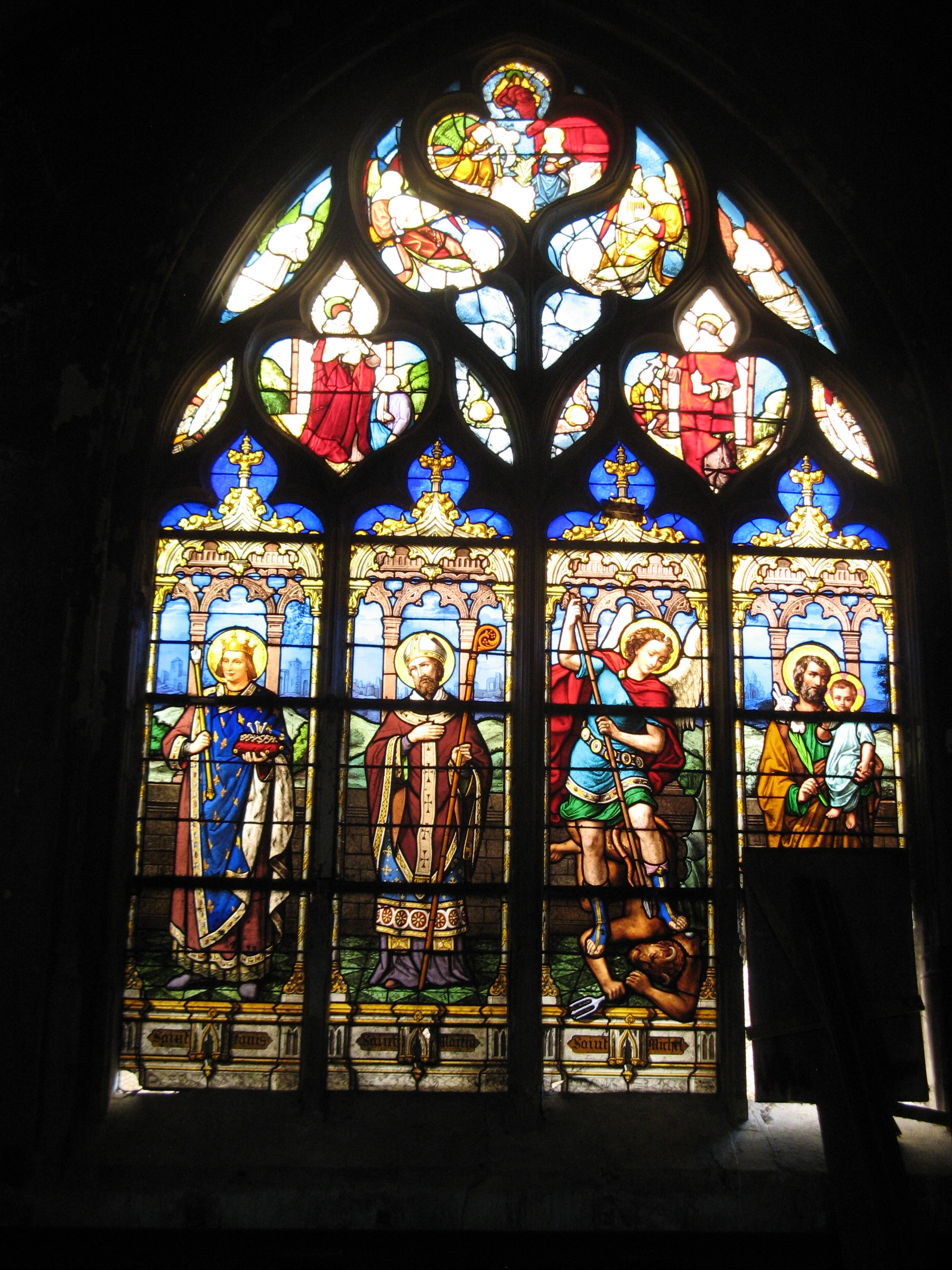
Renaissance stained glass window of the North aisle

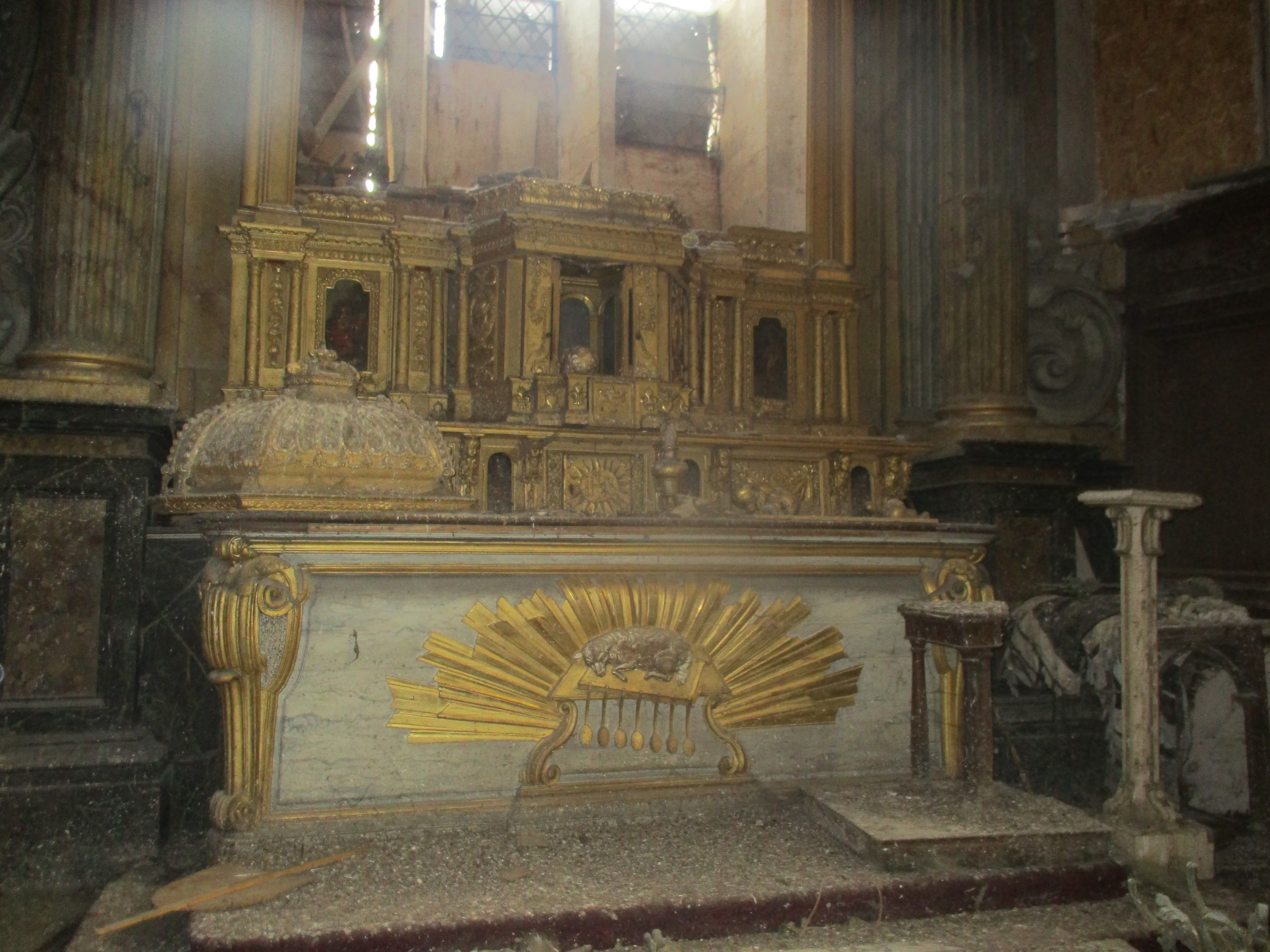
Damaged 18th-century altar

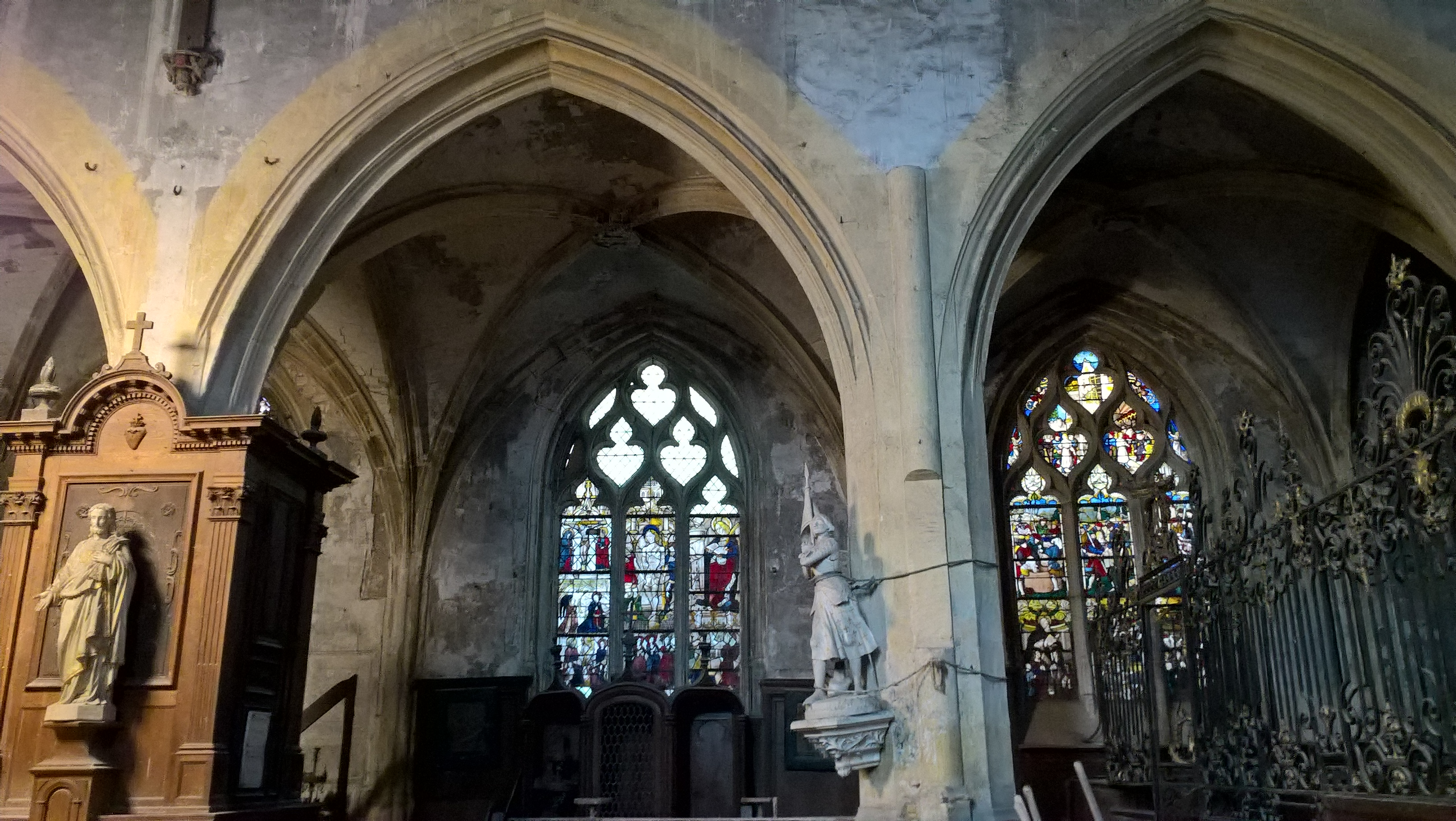
North aisle

An association has been created in 2016 to save the church but nothing has been done yet.
