= Bibliothèque verte =

Green Library (French, Bibliothèque verte) is a collection of French books for children created in 1923 by Hachette. The books are characterized by their green covers. The books had commercial success, being most popular between 1955 and 1980.

== History ==
Created in 1923 for young adolescents, and more particularly for boys, the Bibliothèque verte collection was initially designed to republish the great classics of children's literature, in particular the authors of the Bibliothèque d'éducation et de récréation collection published by Hetzel (including Jules Verne), which was bought by Hachette in 1914.

When the first volumes were published in 1923, the name Bibliothèque verte did not yet appear on the cover, but only on the title page, under the indication: Bibliothèque verte: Nouvelle Bibliothèque d'éducation et de récréation (In English, Green Library: New Education and Recreation Library). These books are already green, a characteristic color of the collection until today.

From 1948 onwards, a significant number of new books were published. Then in 1955, Louis Mirman (1916-1999), literary director of children's books at Hachette since 1947, originally an English teacher and a great admirer of English culture, decided to relaunch the collection with the idea of making it a truly popular collection.

The price of the books was henceforth set according to the monthly pocket money of the children of the time, and the presentation became more modern and more attractive. But the great novelty that Louis Mirman introduced was the publication of Anglo-Saxon series with recurring protagonist. The first protagonist was Alice by the American Caroline Quine, in August 1955. It was a huge bestseller.

Other series were soon commissioned from French authors and added to the success: Michel by Georges Bayard in 1958, Les Six Compagnons by Paul-Jacques Bonzon in 1961 (both published in the Bibliothèque verte) and Fantômette by Georges Chaulet in 1961, in the Bibliothèque rose.

The Bibliothèque verte and the Bibliothèque rose met with unprecedented success, which lasted until the beginning of the 1980s. The children of the sixties and seventies will appropriate these works, published in millions of copies, and will decorate the shelves of their room.
