= Anne Huré =

French writer

- Born: 25 October 1918; Paris
- Occupation: Author
- Years active: 1962-1969

Anne Huré (born Françoise-Anne Huré; 25 October 1918 - presumed dead) was a French writer who authored eight novels, the first of which, Les Deux moniales ("The Two Nuns"), was considered for the prestigious Prix Goncourt in 1962.

== Life and career ==
Anne Huré was born in Paris on 25 October 1918. She studied theology, including classical Greek and Latin, at a Benedictine abbey in Leuven, Belgium, for three years. This time at the monastery she would go on to describe in multiple instances as "unhappy ... but useful and informative".

Huré was frequently in trouble with the police, a situation that would cause controversy during her career as a writer. In 1954, she was sentenced by the court to seven years' incarceration and was barred from visiting Paris for life for theft and falsification of a check. Huré spent her time in prison working on five novels, all of which were set to be published by the publishing house Julliard.

She was released from prison on 20 February 1961. In January 1962, her first novel, Les Deux moniales (The Two Nuns), was published to critical and commercial success. It was selected for consideration by the Prix Goncourt jury. However, before the jury made its decision, Huré was arrested in Paris on 10 May 1962, after she was recognized by one Madame Dupeyroux of Toulouse following an appearance on the literary television program Lectures pour tous. Madame Dupeyroux alleged that Huré had attempted to steal her jewelry from her hotel room in January 1961. A few weeks later, on July 27, in Toulouse, Anne Huré was found guilty of attempted theft. She was sentenced to two months in prison and a 1,000-franc fine.

The ongoing legal troubles caused a controversy in the press which put pressure on the Prix Goncourt jury. Newspapers like Le Figaro felt her criminal charges ought to bar her from consideration. In the end, only four of the ten jurors voted for her book. (The award was given instead to Anna Langfus, a Polish Holocaust survivor, for her novel Les Bagages de Sable, a novel about memories of World War II from the point of view of a young girl.) Later that same year, it was reported that Huré attempted to take her own life.

In 1962, Huré published Entretiens avec Monsieur Renan, a novelistic meditation on Christian morality.

In 1963, 1965, 1969, and 1971 she was arrested for fraud, theft, check forgery, and other petty crimes.

In 1963, Julliard published Anne Huré's autobiographical novel En prison ("In Prison").

After the ongoing controversy surrounding the author, Julliard did not publish her other works. Plon published her other writings beginning with Le péché sans merci ("The Unforgivable Sin") in 1964 up to a collection of short stories, Tendresses d'été ("Summer Tenderness"), published in 1968.

Following this publication and her arrest in 1971, there is no further public record of Anne Huré.

Huré was a self-described conservative. She was quoted as describing herself as "an ardent, extremely right-wing monarchist." Her works often thematically explore Catholic theology. She saw herself as influenced by 18th-century Catholic thought, particularly the work of Nicolas Malebranche. She also had a particular interest in the writings of Plato and Dionysius the Areopagite.

Jennifer Waelti Walters, professor emerita of French and women's studies at the University of Victoria, British Columbia, noted in her book, Damned Women: Lesbians in French Novels, that Huré's first three novels all deal with possibly romantic relationships between two female protagonists and the inability to act on those feelings.

== Works ==
- Les Deux Moniales, Paris: Julliard, 1962.
- Entretiens avec Monsieur Renan, Paris: Julliard, 1962.
- En Prison, Paris: Julliard, 1963.
- Le Péché sans merci, Meaux: Plon, 1964.
- Descente en enfer, Meaux: Plon, 1966.
- Le Haut Chemin, Meaux: Plon, 1966.
- Les Vendages, Meaux: Plon, 1968.
- Tendresses d'été (short story collection), Meaux: Plon, 1968.
