= Hure, Gironde =

Hure
- Commune
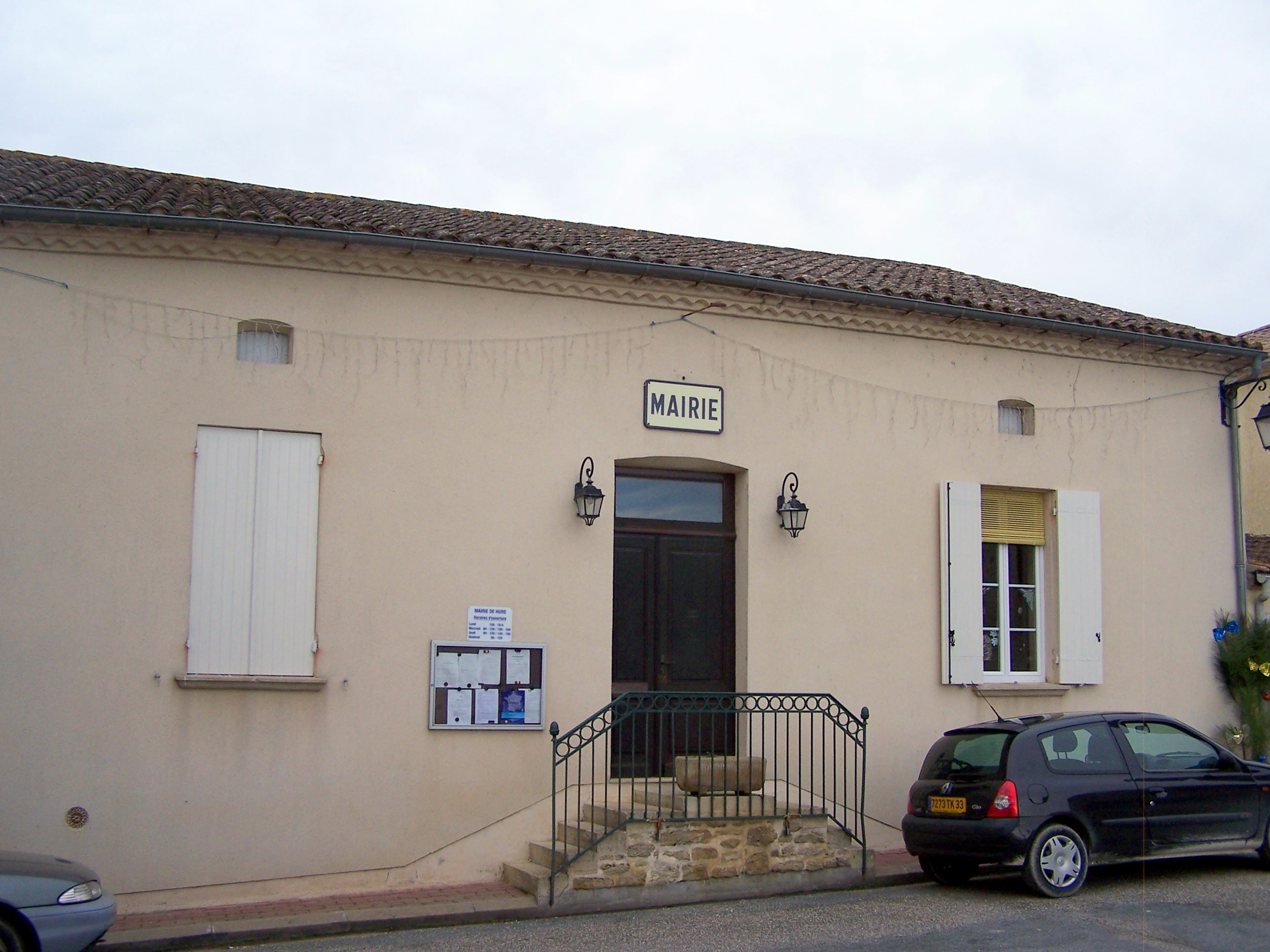
- Town hall
- Location of Hure
- Location within France Location within Nouvelle-Aquitaine
- Coordinates: 44°32′44″N 0°00′05″E
- Country: France
- Region: Nouvelle-Aquitaine
- Department: Gironde
- Arrondissement: Langon
- Canton: Le Réolais et Les Bastides
- Intercommunality: Réolais en Sud Gironde

Government
  - Mayor (2020–2026): Mylène Morin
- Area^{1}: 7.09 km^{2} (2.74 sq mi)
- Elevation: 26 m (85 ft)
- Highest elevation: 63 m (207 ft)
- Lowest elevation: 12 m (39 ft)
- Population (2023): 569
  - Density: 80.3/km^{2} (208/sq mi)
- Time zone: UTC+01:00 (CET)
  - Summer (DST): UTC+02:00 (CEST)
- INSEE/Postal code: 33204 /33190
- ^{1} French Land Register data, which excludes lakes, ponds, glaciers > 1 km^{2} (0.386 sq mi or 247 acres) and river estuaries.

Hure (French pronunciation: [yʁ]; Occitan: Hura) is a commune in the Gironde department in Nouvelle-Aquitaine in southwestern France.

== Population ==
Historical population
Year	Pop.	±% p.a.
1968	528	—
1975	508	−0.55%
1982	435	−2.19%
1990	438	+0.09%
1999	439	+0.03%
2007	480	+1.12%
2012	504	+0.98%
2017	513	+0.35%
2023	569	+1.74%
Source: INSEE

== See also ==
- Communes of the Gironde department
