= Louis Wagner =

Louis Wagner may refer to:

- Louis C. Wagner Jr. (born 1932), United States Army four-star general
- Louis Wagner (racing driver) (1882–1960), French racing driver
- Louis Wagner (American general) (1838–1914), German-born American military infantry
- Louis Wagner (murderer) (died 1875), German fisherman murderer
