= Augusta Hure =

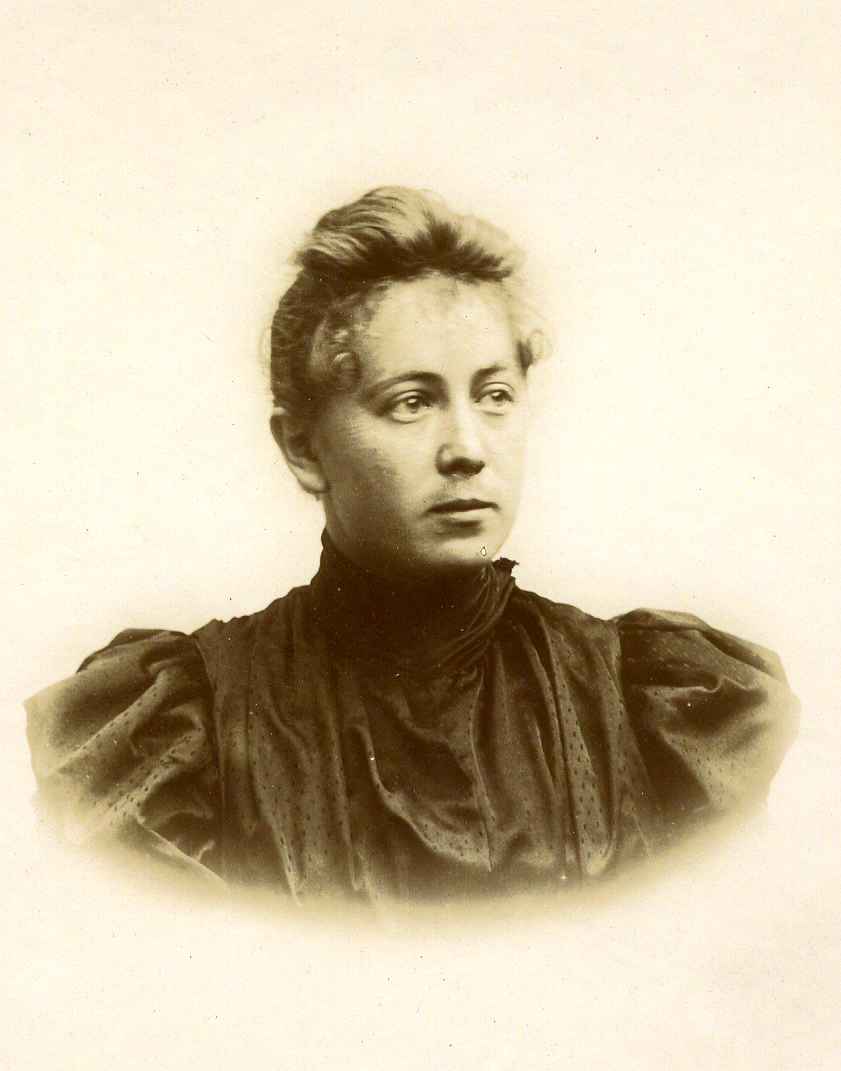
- Born: September 8, 1870; Sens, France
- Died: January 12, 1953 (aged 82)
- Occupation: Museum curator

Augusta Hure (September 8, 1870 - January 12, 1953) was the first woman appointed to museum curator in France. She was nicknamed the "Master of Sénonais Archeology."

== Biography ==
Born in Sens in 1870, Augusta Hure began working as a milliner with her mother before becoming a curator of the Musée de Sens in 1920. She is the first woman appointed to this position in France, and, as a volunteer, performed these duties until her death in 1953.

Passionate about geology, she was also interested in paleontology and archeology. She was self-taught. In 1907, she became a member of the Society of Natural and Historical Sciences of Yonne. In 1913, she became a member of the Geological Society of France and the French Prehistoric Society. In 1949, she was named honorary member of the archaeological society of Sens.

She published many articles, notes and books, sometimes under the name of Savinienne Delavanne.

Augusta Hure also wrote for several learned societies, including the Archaeological Society of Sens.

Her works continued over more than 50 years: 3 volumes, 112 memoirs and notes, and 85 press articles.

== Works ==
Augusta Hure is the author of many books published by Éditions Culture et Civilization:

- Le Sénonais Gallo-Romain, relatant notamment l'imposant site de la Motte du Ciar (The Gallo-Roman Senator, in particular the imposing site of the Motte du Ciar)
- Le Sénonais aux âges du bronze et du fer (The Sénonais in the Bronze and Iron Age)
- Le Sénonais préhistorique (The prehistoric Sénonais)

== Honors / Awards / Titles ==
- 1916- Silver Medal of the Société géologique de France Geological Society of France, following its discovery of the phosphate deposits of the Sénonais
- 1922- Godard Prize of the Society of Anthropology of Paris for its study on the Origine et les exploitations du fer dans l'Yonne (Origin and the exploitation of iron in the Yonne)
- 1923- Mention of the Academy of Inscriptions and belles-lettres
- 1924- Prix Saint-Reine of the Commission of Antiquities of the Côte d'Or, attributed to the Sénonais préhistorique
- 1932 - Mention of the Academy of Inscriptions and belles-lettres awarded to the Le Sénonais aux âges du bronze et du fer
- 1952- Knight of the Legion of Honour

Named in:

- 1927- Correspondent of the Ministry of National Education
- 1928- Departmental Delegate of the French Prehistoric Society
- 1937- Correspondent of the Historical Monuments Commission (Prehistory Section)
- 1941- Inspector of the statues of the department of Yonne
