= Manufrance =

French mail order company

Coordinates: 45°26′27″N 4°23′17.2″E

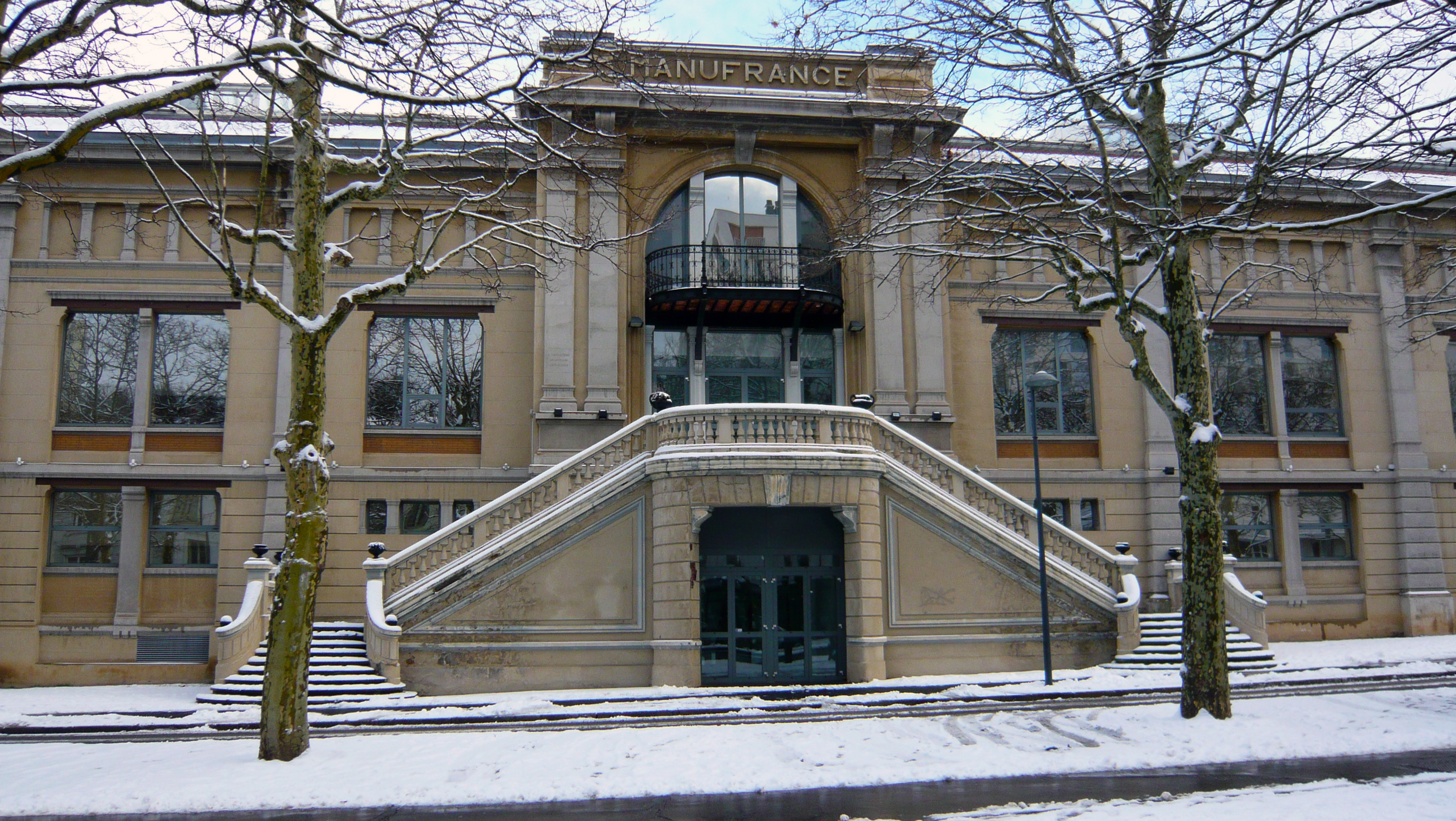
Corporate headquarters in Saint-Étienne

Manufrance was the trade name of Manufacture Francaise d'Armes et Cycles de Saint-Étienne ("French Arms and Cycle Factory of Saint-Étienne"), a French mail order company in the manufacturing town of Saint-Étienne since 1888.

== History ==
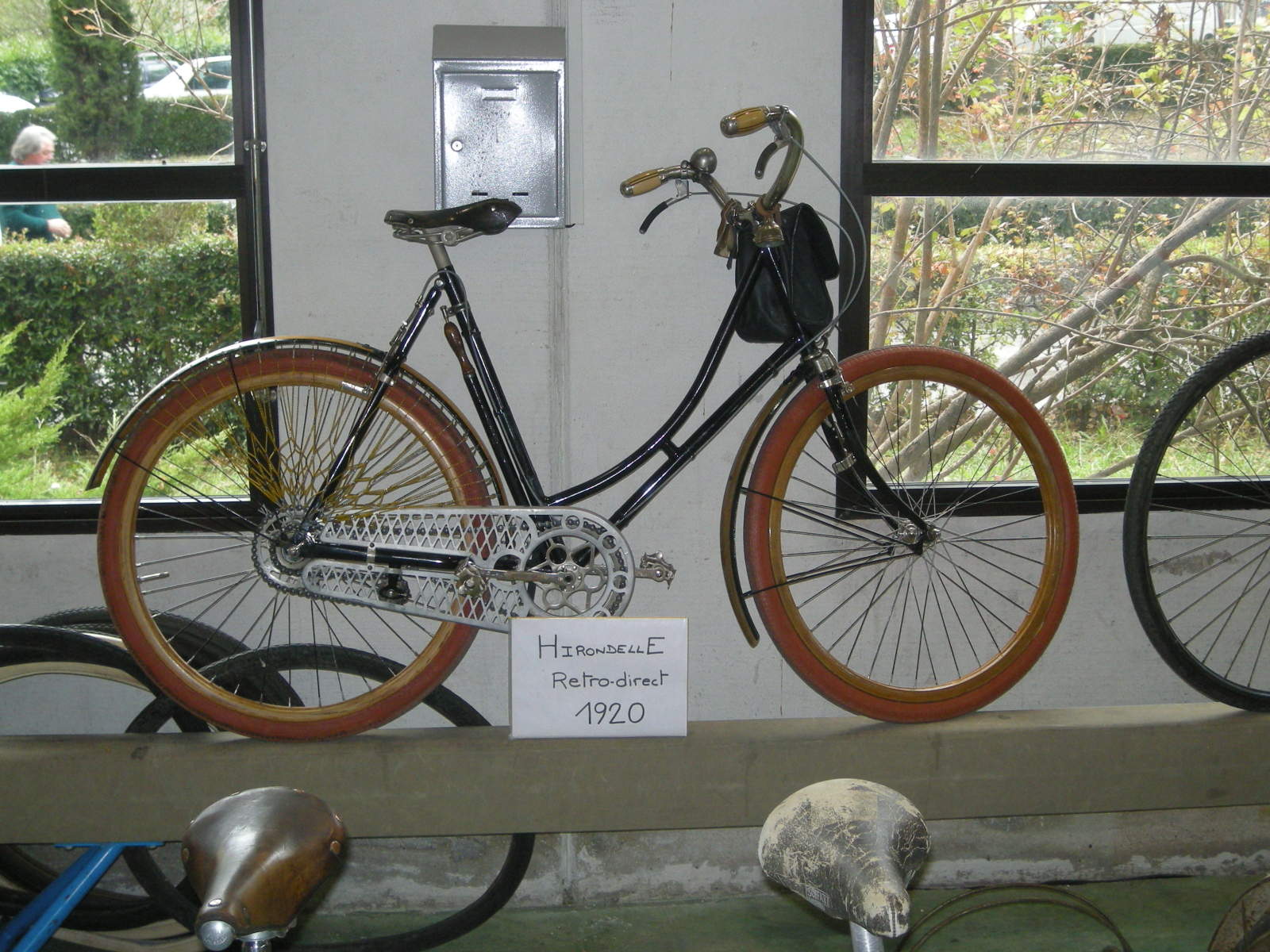
A Hirondelle bicycle produced by Manufrance in 1920

The first French mail order company, it mainly specialised in shotguns (Robust, Falcor, Ideal, Simplex) and bicycles (Hirondelle) since 1890. However, they covered other products, ranging from fishing rods to household items, such as wall clocks. Most of the products sold by Manufrance were made by third-party manufacturers, then labeled and retailed by Manufrance.

An unregistered Manufrance LaSalle 12-gauge shotgun, with a sawn-off barrel, was used by the perpetrator of the 2014 Sydney hostage crisis in Australia, who was unlicensed. Restrictions on illegal firearms were tightened as a result.

== Ownership ==
It was bought by Jacques Tavitian in 1988.

== See also ==
- Sears – Department store chain in the United States
