= 1905 International Tourist Trophy =

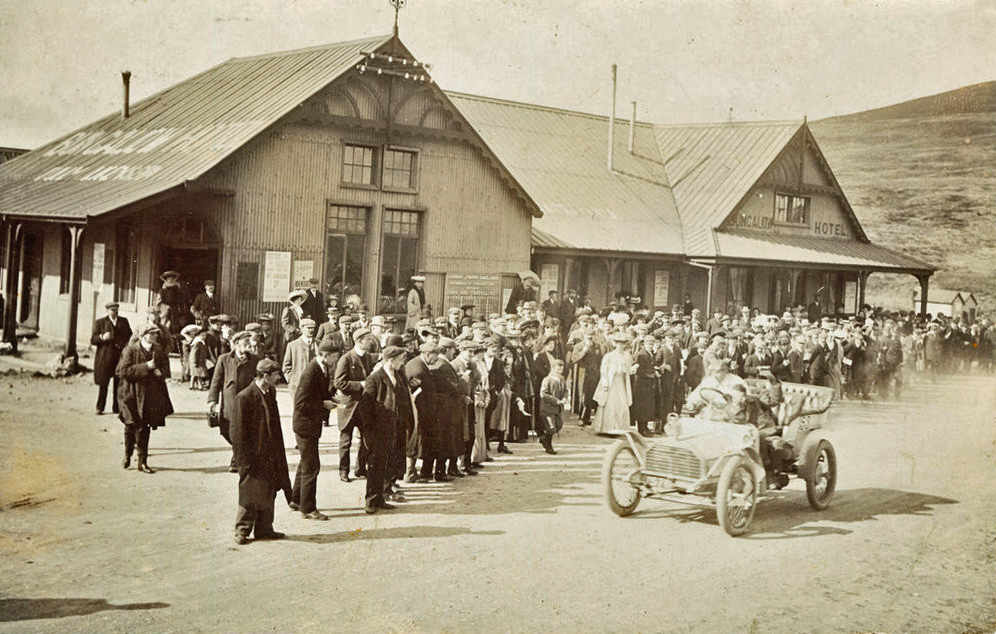
- Race winner John Napier, passing The Bungalow

Race details
- Date: 15 September 1905
- Location: Isle of Man
- Course: Highroads Course
- Course length: 51.125 miles (82.278 km)
- Distance: 4 laps, 208.5 miles (335.5 km)

Podium
First	John Napier	Arrol-Johnston
Second	Percy Northey	Rolls-Royce
Third	Norman Littlejohn	Vinot-Deguingand

The 1905 International Tourist Trophy was an automobile motor race held on 14 September 1905 on closed public roads along the Highroads Course on the Isle of Man. It was organised by the Automobile Club of Great Britain and Ireland, and was the first time that what became known as the RAC Tourist Trophy was awarded. The race lasted over six hours and was won by John Napier, driving an Arrol-Johnston. Percy Northey finished second in a Rolls-Royce, while the Vinot-Deguingand driver Norman Littlejohn was third.

Prior to the Tourist Trophy the Isle of Man had hosted the English trials for the Gordon Bennett Cup as the English government had banned motor racing on its roads. The Automobile Club wanted to run an event to help develop fuel efficiency in motor cars and opted to use the same route as had been used for the trials. In order to make the event relevant to those cars on general sale they imposed rules to prevent specialist race cars from entering, though there were complaints that the rules were too restrictive and detracted from the spectacle.

There were 58 entrants but only 42 of these started the race. Less than half of the cars completed the full 208.5 miles (335.5 km) and there were more retirements due to mechanical failures and crashes than a lack of fuel. The top three were separated by just over five minutes, while the final finisher took almost three hours longer than Napier. The event was held again in 1906 though the overall distance covered was shortened to around 160 miles (260 km).

== Background ==
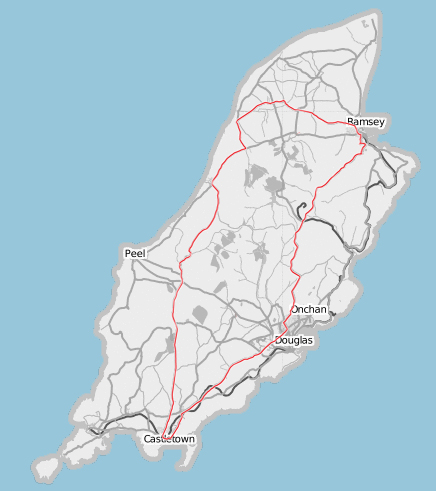
The "Highlands Course" used for the race

At the start of the twentieth century motor racing was banned on English roads, and although the Automobile Club of Great Britain and Ireland (later renamed the Royal Automobile Club) had lobbied the British government to remove speed limits and allow provision for motor racing in England the Motor Car Act 1903 only raised the speed limit to 20 miles per hour (32 km/h) and did not repeal the ban on racing. British cars and drivers had nonetheless been successful during the 1902 Gordon Bennett Cup, and as such the Automobile Club wanted to host the 1903 Gordon Bennett Cup in Britain. After their failure to persuade the government to allow racing in England the 1903 race had been held in Ireland under the provision of the Light Locomotives (Ireland) Act, but this had been a one-off, and the Automobile Club did not manage to get the law extended for further races.

As such, when the Automobile Club wanted to hold trials for the 1904 Gordon Bennett Cup to establish three vehicles to represent England at the race in Germany they approached the Manx legislature, the Tynwald, in early 1904 and proposed to hold the trials on the island. The Highway (Light Locomotives) Bill was rushed through the Tynwald in March 1904 but only allowed racing for three days during that year, specifically for the Gordon Bennett trials to take place. The following year, after further lobbying from the Automobile Club, the bill was renewed as the Highways (Motor Car) Bill, without a fixed term. The bill gave provision for six days of racing to take place; three for the Gordon Bennett trials in the spring, and three for the Tourist Trophy in the autumn.

=== Course ===
The course used for the race was the same as had been used for the 1904 and 1905 Gordon Bennett trials, a 52.125-mile (83.887 km) course featuring over 420 corners which followed much of the modern day Snaefell Mountain Course, known as the Highroads Course (or Highlands). The lap began at Quarterbridge in Douglas and proceeded down the A5 road towards Castletown, then back up the A3 to Ballaugh where it then headed towards Jurby along the A10, but turned onto the A13 towards Ramsey. From Ramsey the course followed the A18, commonly known as the Mountain Road, back to Douglas. The elevation of the Isle of Man was challenging for the cars; the course rose from being barely above sea-level at Douglas to 1,384 feet (422 m) at Brandywell. Many parts of the course were nothing more than rough tracks. In order to minimise disruption to the public two footbridges were built over the roads of the course, one at Kirkmichael and the other at Ramsey.

=== Cars ===
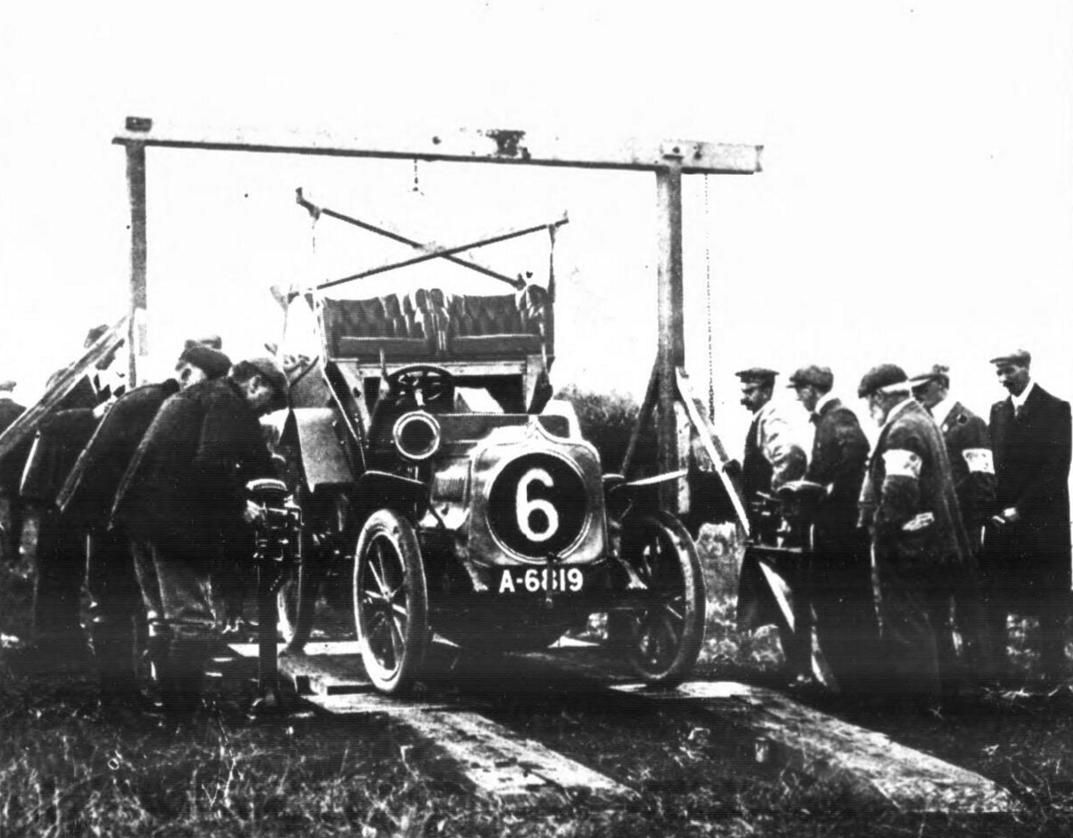
The chassis of a Speedwell car being weighed prior to the race.

The cars were subject to a number of criteria: the chassis had to weigh between 1,300 and 1,600 pounds (590–730 kg), they were required to have a wheelbase of at least seven point five feet (2.3 m), and to carry a load of 950 pounds (430 kg), including the driver, an optional passenger, and ballast. Additionally, the car had to be able to carry four people, including the driver, and the model of car had to be available for sale for at least a month after the race. Initially, it was decided that each car was only allowed to use one imperial gallon (4.5 L) of fuel per 25 miles (40 km) of the race, but due to the conditions, this was altered to one imperial gallon per 22.5 miles (36.2 km). Most of the cars opted to use Continental tyres; just the Maudslays and Napiers used Palmer, the Whites and Swifts used Dunlop, while the Wolseley and Darracq vehicles used Michelin.

The rules were introduced in an attempt to make the cars more representative of the touring cars that members of the public could drive. In many ways they were successful; Charles Rolls' 20 horsepower Rolls-Royce was one of the more powerful of the cars to enter the Tourist Trophy, but in contrast, during the 1905 Gordon Bennett Cup he drove a 2,200-pound (1,000 kg) Wolseley which generated 112 horsepower. However, a number of manufacturers were put off from entering the contest due to the upper weight limit imposed. It was opined in The Graphic that this excluded the "kind of cars that were really wanted", as they suggested that the chassis of "an ordinary four-cylinder touring car, such as is sold to the public" weighed 1,792 pounds (813 kg). Although it had been originally suggested that the number of foreign entries should be limited, with no more than two foreign cars for every five British entries, no such restrictions were imposed, but it was decided to give special prizes for cars entirely British-built. While the majority of cars were British, there were also entries from France, including a Vinot-Deguingand and a Peugeot and the United States, including a pair of White steam cars and a Cadillac.

== Practice ==
Of the 58 original entrants to the event, ten pulled out before the entry list was published, generally because they either could not reduce the weight of their car sufficiently to be within the limits, or they could not achieve the required fuel efficiency. The first of the cars to arrive on the Isle of Man was the 16 horsepower Minerva, entered by Charles Rolls, but driven by E. H. Arnott, which arrived more than two weeks before the race. During the weeks before the race the cars were tested around the island's roads, during which Arnott managed the fastest circuit of the course. There were also a number of accidents during the practices; Ernest de Wilton crashed his Swift into a stone wall near Castletown, causing significant damage to the car. Although it was repaired in time there was a miscommunication between de Wilton and the race organisers, and de Wilton did not present the car for inspection in time to be entered into the race. Another of the competitors, A. McCormack in a Gladiator, hit some cows after coming off the road, and caused such damage to the car's brakes that it could not be repaired in time for the race. On the Sunday prior to the race local residents were upset that forty of the cars were driving the course, and meetings were held where they expressed their indignation that it was a "desecration of the sanctity of the Sabbath". Three days prior to the race, the organisers began weighing the cars and filling them with the specified amount of fuel. The Mors car which was to have been driven by Dorothy Levitt never arrived on the island, and so Levitt was unable to take part in the race.

== Race report ==
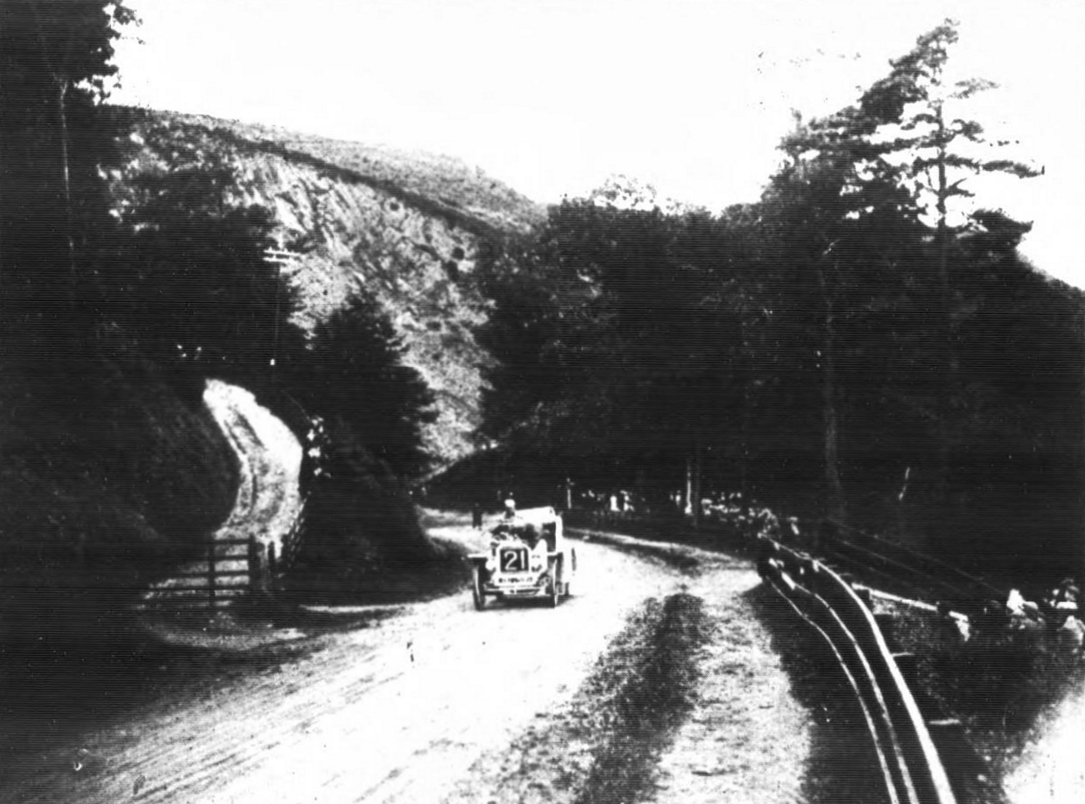
A Maudslay car, driven by W. H. Cox, at the 1905 Isle of Man Tourist Trophy.

Due to the limited fuel allowance, the cars were towed to the start line by horses. The first car, a Rolls-Royce being driven by Charles Rolls, started at 9 am, and the following 41 cars were released at one minute intervals. Due to the fuel-saving nature of the event most of the drivers began the race by letting their car coast down the initial slope under its own momentum before engaging gear. Early on the first lap of the race Rolls heard a crunching noise from his gear box and the car stopped. He claimed that upon investigation he discovered that small nuts and screws had been dropped into the gearbox, which had smashed a gear. Rolls claimed that this "was a common trick abroad" but voiced surprise at it happening in an English race. There was further speculation of foul play when it was discovered that Arnott's Minerva had been tampered with; two spark plugs had been smashed and an air valve bent, causing his engine to overheat. Before the race Rolls and Arnott had been two of the favourites, and The Automobile magazine said that "this unfortunate incident has greatly detracted from the success of the race."

Early in the race John Downie crashed into a pub in Ballasalla, but the car did not sustain extensive damage and he was able to continue the race. At Keppel Gate on the Mountain Road, Frederick Bennett, who had been unable to take part in the practice sessions and therefore did not know the course very well, approached a corner with too much speed in his Cadillac and crashed, ripping off two of the wheels. Bennett managed to stay in the vehicle and avoided serious injury. Another driver to go off the track was J. Hadley in his Wolseley, who also carried too much speed into a corner, leading him to drive off through a hedge and into a field. The Thornycroft driven by Tom Thornycroft had been following closely behind, and the two cars collided during the incident, damaging one of the Thornycroft's rear wheels. Napier in his Arrol-Johnston made the quickest circuit of the first lap in one hour, 32 minutes and 36 seconds.

During the second lap a number of drivers were forced to retire with broken wheels. Both Darracq drivers, A. Rawlinson and Algernon Lee Guinness, suffered from the issue; Rawlinson broke his in Ramsey, while Lee Guinness hit a well at Hilberry. A. J. Dew also broke a wheel, but continued the race in W. H. Warren's car; both being entered by J. W. H. Dew. A fourth driver, in one of the White steam cars, succumbed to the same problem, while A. J. Hancock crashed his Vauxhall into a tree, also breaking a wheel. Napier was once again the quickest driver around the circuit, followed by Percy Northey in a Rolls-Royce, and Norman Littlejohn in the Vinot-Deguingand.

After his earlier crash Downie retired on the third lap with a broken wheel, while Thornycroft, who had also had first lap trouble, was forced to stop with a broken rear axle. Over the final two laps a number of cars ran out of fuel, and of the 42 starters only 18 completed the race. The first car to finish was the Rolls-Royce of Percy Northey. He had started twenty minutes ahead of Napier's Arrol-Johnston so Napier had to finish within twenty minutes of Northey in order to win. He did so, passing the finish line eighteen minutes later, having run the fastest lap of the race at the end to win by just over two minutes. Napier's time was 6 hours 9 minutes 14.6 seconds, followed by Northey in 6:11:23 and Norman Littlejohn in a French Vinot-Deguingand, in 6:14:32.4. The three drivers had been consistently the quickest throughout the race and were separated by just over five minutes. The next quickest driver was E. J. C. Roberts in the second of the Arrol-Johnstons, but he was over 25 minutes behind his victorious team-mate.

=== Ancillary incidents ===
Around an hour after the start of the race, three children were struck by car driven by one of the race officials on a side road from Quarter Bridge Road, near the finish line. None sustained serious injuries; two of them had cuts dressed, while the third rushed back to watching the racing. Another, more serious, accident occurred on the Snaefell Mountain Railway, which had been transporting people up the mountain to watch the racing. A tramcar that had been descending the railway had broken down, and a second car had stopped close behind it. A third tram, on rounding the bend above them, was unable to stop in time and collided into the rearmost car, which was then propelled into the car in front of it. Minor injuries were sustained by some of the passengers, though none were serious.

== Post-race and legacy ==
Opinion as to the success of the race was divided in the press; The Automobile magazine declared that "it must be said that it was a success", while The Yorkshire Post went even further, claiming that "the end of the monster racing-car is in sight". They suggested that racing cars were only useful to help develop technology for ordinary cars, and that the cars used in the Gordon Bennett races and similar were no longer relevant. Along with the withdrawal of France and Britain from the Gordon Bennett races, and the amount of support for the Tourist Trophy, they commended the Automobile Club for "[recognising] the changed conditions of affairs." In contrast, Filson Young of The Manchester Guardian was strong in his criticism of the event. He opined that it had been a disappointment, though it had "never many possibilities as a spectacle" due to the fact that the cars only passed each point four times during the day. Though he conceded that the concept of the race had been admirable he felt that the cost of fuel was negligible in the running of a motor car and that other factors, such as general reliability over a thousand or more miles, were more important.

The Tourist Trophy was held on the Isle of Man again in each of the subsequent three years. The race remained four laps, but was run over a shorter course of around 40 miles (64 km). Charles Rolls won the 1906 event, while Napier finished over an hour behind in his Arrol-Johnston. After further races on the Isle of Man in 1914 and 1922, the event moved to Dundonald in Northern Ireland. The "Tourist Trophy" moniker became more closely associated with the Isle of Man TT motorcycle races, which began in 1907 and have continued to run on the Isle of Man ever since.

== Classification ==
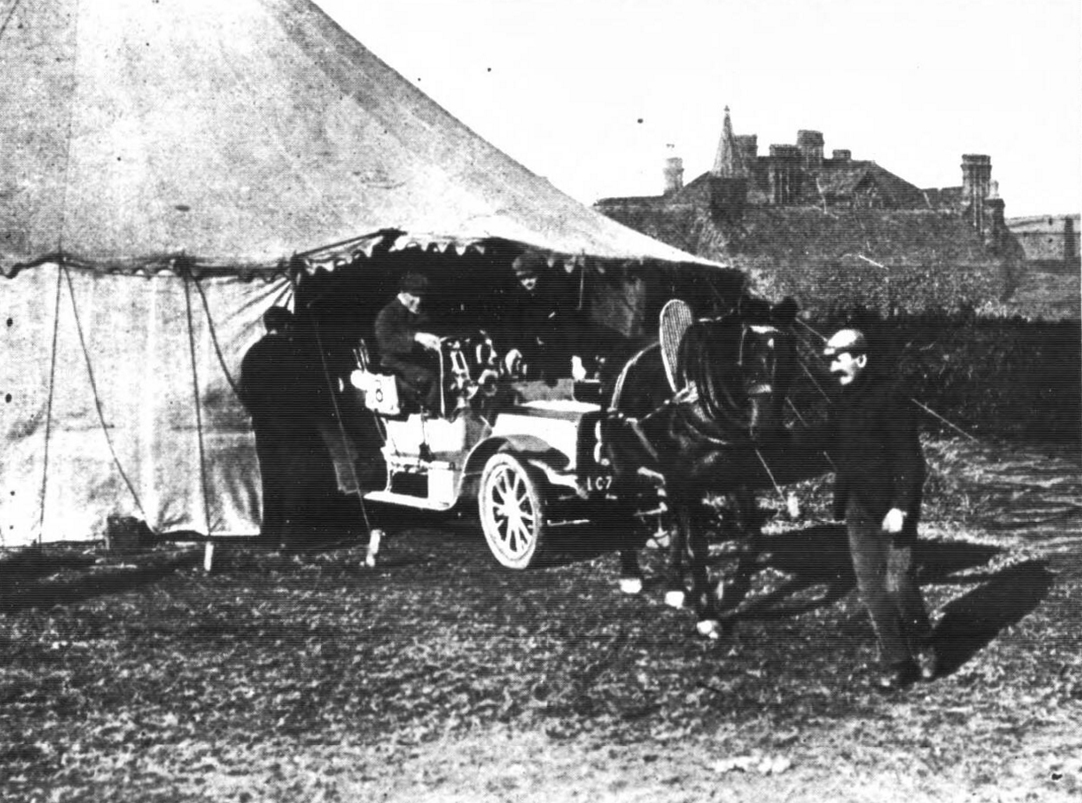
W. H. Astell's Orleans car being pulled out of the garage by a horse.

Final standings
Rank	Driver	Entry	Car	HP	Speed	Time
1	John Napier	John Napier	Arrol-Johnston	18	33.90 mph	6:09.14.60
2	Percy Northey	Charles Rolls	Rolls-Royce	20	33.60 mph	6:11.23.00
3	Norman Littlejohn	C. H. Wigan	Vinot-Deguingand	14	33.40 mph	6:14.35.40
4	Cyril Roberts	John Napier	Arrol-Johnston	18	31.70 mph	6:36.58.60
5	Ernest Courtis	J. K. Starkey	Rover	16	31.00 mph	6:43.53.60
6	Harvey du Cros (junior)	Harvey du Cros (junior)	Swift	16	29.70 mph	7:01.12.40
7	W. H. Astell	W. H. Astell	Orleans	15	29.20 mph	7:07.42.20
8	W. Parker Thomas	A. Govan	Argyll	14	29.00 mph	7:10.25.00
9	Thomas Jenner	W. H. Astell	Orleans	15	28.50 mph	7:19.32.40
10	Clifford Earp	S. F. Edge	Napier	18	28.00 mph	7:27.44.60
11	R. W. Maudslay	R. W. Maudslay	Standard	16	27.90 mph	7:28.02.40
12	Edmund W. Lewis	Edmund W. Lewis	Rover	16	21.70 mph	7:41.23.60
13	Charles Friswell	F. G. Lewin	Peugeot	10	26.20 mph	7:58.54.40
14	Arthur J. Clay	Arthur J. Clay	Ryknield	15	25.40 mph	8:11.44.20
15	Frank G. Cundy	Cecil Edge	Napier	18	25.20 mph	8:17.10.40
16	John Dennis	R. Dennis	Dennis	14	24.70 mph	8:26.43.60
17	Richard Lascelles	F. R. Simms	Simms-Welbeck	20	22.50 mph	8:49.08.00
18	Robert Downing	R. Dennis	Dennis	14	23.00 mph	9:05.48.80

== Bibliography ==
- Vaukins, Simon (2014). The Isle of Man TT Races: Motorcycling, Society and Identity. Newcastle-upon-Tyne: Cambridge Scholars Publishing. ISBN 978-1-4438-6030-7.
