= Deguingand =

French automobile manufacturer

Société des Nouveaux Ateliers&A. Deguingand (Deguingand)
- Founded: 1927
- Defunct: 1930
- Headquarters: Puteaux, France
- Key people: Albert Deguingand (1872–1943)
- Products: Automobiles

Société des Nouveaux Ateliers A. Deguingand was a short-lived French automobile manufacturer.

== The business ==
Since 1901 Albert Deguingand (1872–1943) had been in partnership as an automobile manufacturer with Lucien-Marie Vinot-Préfontaine (1858–1915), but his business partner had died in the war and in 1926 Vinot-Deguingand, the company they had founded together, had run out of customers and its factory in the west of France was sold to Donnet-Zédel.

With the foundation of Société des Nouveaux Ateliers A. Deguingand, Deguingand returned to the Paris region where the French automobile industry and its supplier base were heavily concentrated. The cars carried the Deguingand name. There was also a change of direction in terms of the market segment contested, the cars being now targeted squarely at the small car sector. The company did not meet with great success, however, and Deguingand production had ended by 1930.

== The cars ==
The first model was a small car powered by a 4-cylinder engine of 1170cc from S.C.A.P. A choice was offered between a side-valve version of the power unit and an overhead valve version, for which power outputs of respectively 22 hp (16 kW) and 28 hp (21 kW) were listed. The model failed to gain traction in the market place, however, in an increasingly price sensitive market segment that by now was hotly contested by the volume makers, above all Citroën, whose mass-production strategy left the products of second tier French auto-makers looking expensive. The Deguingand had been delisted by the end of 1928.

At the 22nd Paris Motor Show, Deguingand exhibited a smaller model, now in the 5CV car tax band, using a two-stroke 4-cylinder unit designed by Marcel Violet whose two-stroke engine designs were at this time appearing in a number of cars produced in the Paris region. The engine in the Deguingand 5CV was unusual in that the four cylinders operated in just two combustion chambers, the pistons being placed in pairs, one at each end of a shared combustion tube. The car sat on a 2,430 mm (96 in) wheel base and was aggressively priced at just 11,000 francs in October 1928. It nevertheless failed to find customers and disappeared at the end of 1929. The same basic design nevertheless reappeared in 1931, now manufactured in Nanterre as a Donnet.

== Reading list ==
- Harald Linz, Halwart Schrader: Die Internationale Automobil-Enzyklopädie. United Soft Media Verlag, München 2008, ISBN 978-3-8032-9876-8. (German)
- George Nick Georgano (Chefredakteur): The Beaulieu Encyclopedia of the Automobile. Volume 3: P–Z. Fitzroy Dearborn Publishers, Chicago 2001, ISBN 1-57958-293-1. (English)
- George Nick Georgano: Autos. Encyclopédie complète. 1885 à nos jours. Courtille, Paris 1975. (French)
