= Zédel =

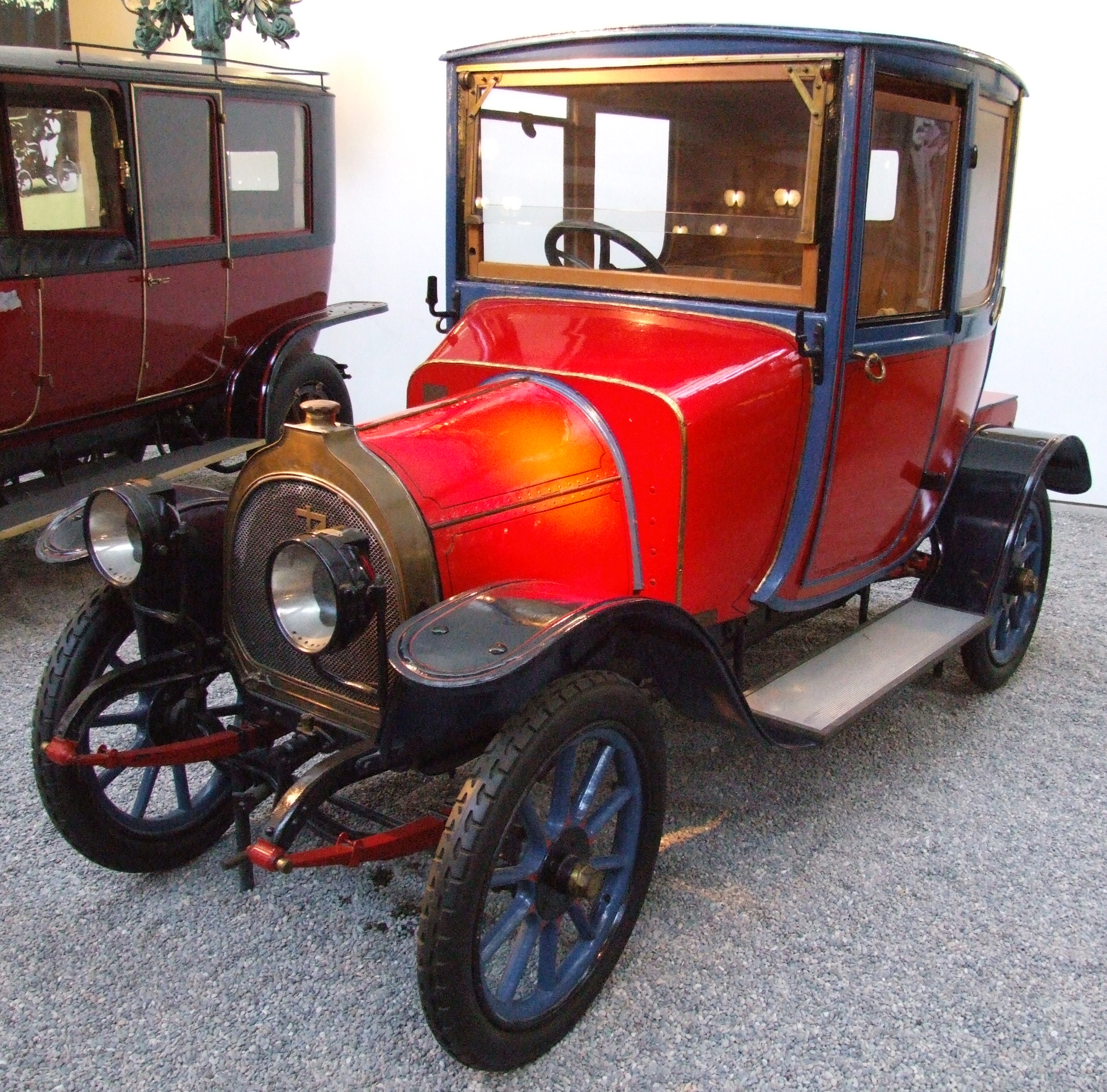
Zedel Coupé Docteur CI of 1911, 4 cylinder, 1954 ccm, 4 HP, 48 km/h, Cité de l'Automobile, Mulhouse, France

Zédel was a Swiss automobile manufacturer established in 1901 by Ernest Zürcher and Herman Lüthi. The name of the company was created by combining the first letters of the founders' names, "Z" and "L".

During the early years of the twentieth century a factory was set up across the frontier in France, and the Swiss operation was closed a few years later, so that from around 1905 the business had become, in effect, a French one.

== History ==
The company's origins go back to 1896 when Ernest Zürcher (known in German language sources as Ernst Zürcher) set up a workshop in Neuchâtel and in 1897 became the first Swiss producer of motorcycle engines. He was commercially successful, and on 4 January 1901, with Hermann Lüthi, he founded the company "Zürcher & Lüthi & Cie SA" at nearby Saint-Aubin-Sauges. On 21 March 1902 Hermann Lüthi withdrew from the business which was now renamed as "SA Fabrique de Moteurs et de Machines ZL".

In 1903 the company established a production facility in Pontarlier, between Lausanne and Besançon and, importantly, on the French side of the frontier. The location was chosen in order to avoid the tariff barriers that protected French manufacturers from Swiss imports. Shortly after this, on 30 June 1905, Zürcher closed the Swiss production facility at Saint-Aubin-Sauges. Establishing production in France also gave Zedel direct access to experienced automotive engineers and technicians in France which was at this time still, in terms of output, the world's leading automobile producer. By 1906 (and possibly a little earlier), Zedel was producing automobiles (known as Zedels) at Pontarlier. By 1914 about 400 units had been produced.

Swiss production of engines, motor bikes and automobiles resumed briefly from 11 November 1907 when Zürcher appointed a Swiss engineer called Samuel Graf as director of the company's Swiss affiliate and the Saint-Aubin-Sauges facility was reopened. However, Swiss production came to an end again in 1908.

In 1919, the company was taken over by Jérôme Donnet, an automobile pioneer who had prospered during the war as a producer of flying boats. The company became known as Donnet-Zédel, although in October 1919 they were still exhibiting at the Paris Motor Show under the "Zedel" name. For 1920 the manufacturer was offering a 4-cylinder 2742cc engined car with a 2,950 mm (116 in) wheelbase, priced in bare chassis form at 14,000 francs. Also offered were a torpedo bodied car with 4/6 seats from 21,000 francs and a saloon/sedan style closed bodied "conduite intérieure" version at 26,000 francs.

== See also ==
- Donnet
- Simca
