= Arthur John McCormack =

Arthur John McCormack, CBE, (1866–1936) was an English businessman and patent holder. He is principally associated with Vickers' Wolseley Motors Limited where he was MD from 1911 to 1923 when Wolseley was Britain's largest motor manufacturer.

== Personal life ==
Arthur was born on 6 February 1866 in London, England to William McCormack and Matilda Winter. He was the oldest of 12 children. In his early career, McCormack became involved in the Motor Industry via cycling where he honed his skills as a racer and an engineer working at John Griffith Cycle Corporation during the 1890s Bicycle boom and Gladiator Cycle Company.

== Early career and racing ==
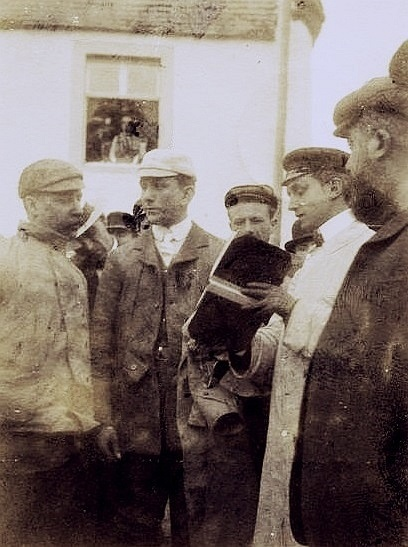
McCormack (left) talks to Charles Jarrott, "Circuit des Ardennes" winner, 1902.

He had joined Panhard & Levassor where he was technical manager in 1902 and was named the riding mechanic to Charles Jarrott (racing driver) when he won the 1902 Circuit des Ardennes race. While at Panhard & Levassor in 1904 he was responsible for selling a 35HP car to the Sultan of Johore showing that he had both mechanical and business acumen.

He left Panhard in 1905 and joined Gladiator where he became the UK Manager. He entered a Gladiator car into the Gordon Bennett Trials on 23 May 1905 and then into the Isle of Man Tourist Trophy later that year. In 1906 he entered the Scottish Trials in the Gladiator and again entered the Tourist Trophy (although the records show he failed to start). He had greater success in 1907 entering an 18 H.P. Siddeley into the Frome Hill Climb See image of McCormacks car coming up Frome Hill. He was one of the founder members of the Importers' Protection Association Ltd. set-up to help foreign car manufacturers (like Gladiator) import their products into the UK.

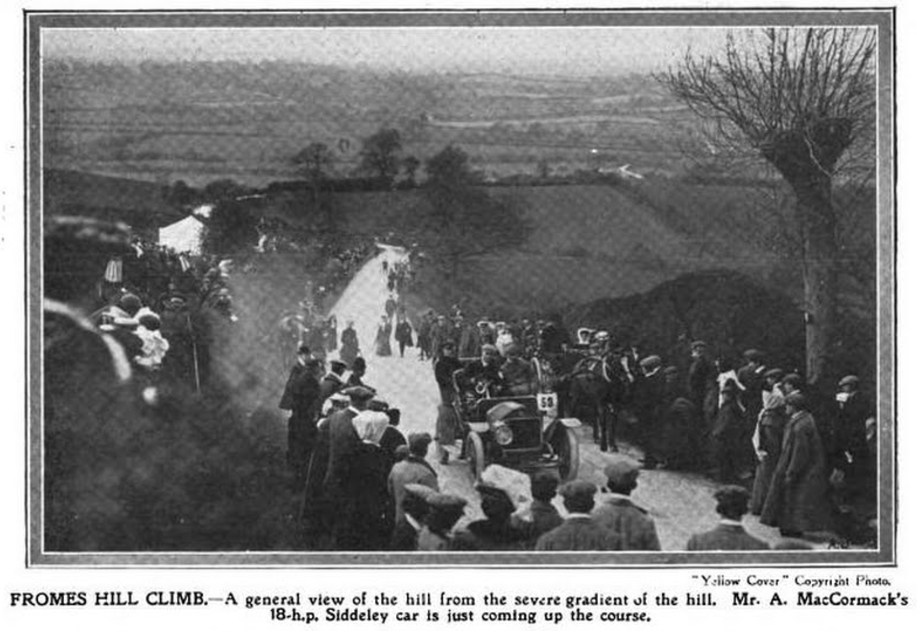
Arthur John McCormack drives an 18 H.P. Siddeley on the Frome Hill Climb race.

== Patents and time at Wolseley ==
He became Technical manager at Wolseley's Adderley Park from 1907 in 1911 he was appointed Technical Director and joint MD (with Ernest Hopwood who resigned in 1919) at Wolseley Motors. While at Wolseley he was involved in the design of a number of patents. One is Patent #: 18,168 where the assignee is The Wolseley Tool and Motor Car Company, Limited; Arthur McCormack Date: 1912 Title: Improvements in the Means Employed in Cooling Internal Combustion Engines of Aeroplanes and other Power-propelled Aerial Bodies. He was MD at Wolseley when the company modified the Hispano Suiza HS-8 and called it the Wolseley Viper

During his time at Wolseley he travelled to the US to give evidence to the US Senate finance committee in the matter of cost of production of roller bearings. Wolseley was making them under license from Timken Bearings. He also comments on the advantages of Worm Gear vs Bevels and their use in cars coming down on the side of the use of the worm gear despite the difficulty in manufacture.

The Wolseley Viper engine was not only used in the RAF SE5a WW1 aircraft but also used in racing the Wolseley cars after McCormack set up a competition racing group. The Wolseley Viper 1 was the earliest known racing car to use this engine. The Wolseley Moth and later the Wolseley 15 HP held a number of records. The development of these racing cars and work on the Viper engine caused Wolseley to be one of the first companies to make use of the overhead camshaft.

At the end of WW1 he received the O.B.E followed two years later in 1920 with the C.B.E. both for services rendered to industry during the war. The post-war chairman of Wolseley, Sir Vincent Caillard, attributed this to his efforts in transforming the Wolseley works into a war factory.

When the Automobile Industry decided to formalise research in early 1920 and created the Research Association of British Motor Manufacturers, Arthur McCormack, representing Wolseley was on the first council. The Associations role was both research and collection of research to aid its members.

In 1922, he was made President of BEN (Automotive Industry Charity).

McCormack resigned from Wolseley in November 1923 and was replaced by a committee of management. Timken bearings production was taken on by another Vickers business and other expansion plans failed. His spectacular 1921 London showroom in Piccadilly was sold for banking premises. Receivers were appointed in 1926 and the following year W R Morris, later Viscount Nuffield, purchased the Wolseley business.

== Later life ==
In 1926 he joined the board of ill-fated AC Cars (Autocarrier) in Thames Ditton where he worked with Selwyn Francis Edge.

He died on 10 April 1936 aged 70 at Little House, Thames Ditton and was buried in Thames Ditton, England.
