= Wolseley Racing =

Wolseley Racing consisted of a number of motor car racing efforts between 1903 and 1969 supported by Wolseley Motor Company which resulted in many victories and helped promote the brand and prowess of the company. In addition to the company-sponsored racing there were individuals who entered Wolseley cars or cars with Wolseley motors into races. The history of Wolseley Racing can be split into three periods matching the history of the automobile:

1. The early days before World War I when the automotive industry and racing was in its infancy
2. between the wars after production was switched from a war effort back to domestic products and the innovations of WW1 had been applied to engine technology and
3. from after World War II to the present day.

== Before World War I ==
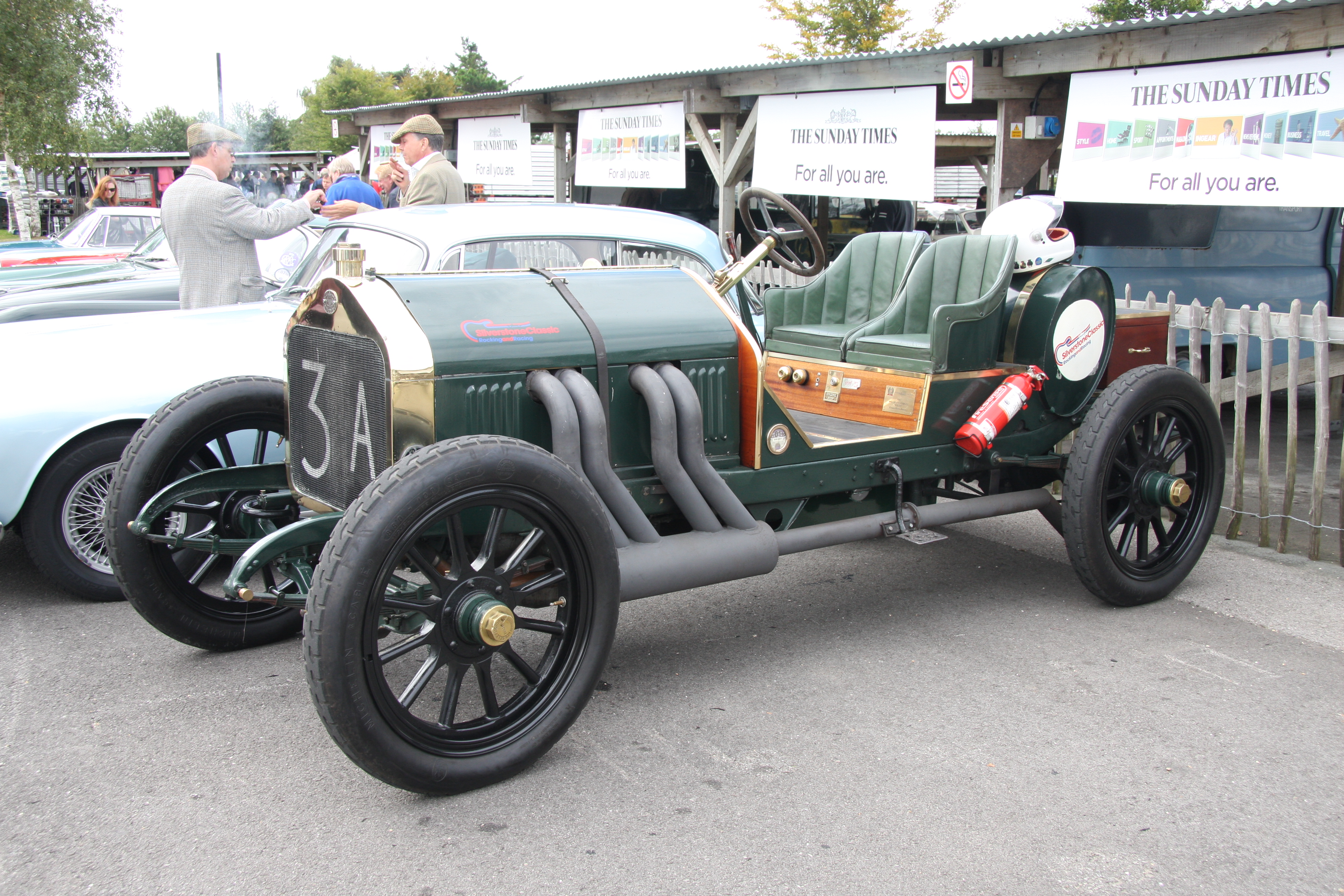
1907 Wolseley-Siddeley "Wolsit" Coppa Floria Racer - Flickr - exfordy

With Napier & Son, the Wolseley cars were Britain's only entries in early races such as the 1902 Gordon Bennett Cup and Paris-Vienna Trial, 1903 Paris–Madrid race, the 1904 Circuit des Ardennes and 1905 Gordon Bennett Cup where Charles Rolls was a driver. The 1903 race saw not only a Wolseley car driven by Herbert Austin himself (later to own the company) but another of the Wolseleys was involved in a high-speed accident (one of a number during the race) that ultimately caused this form of city to city road-racing to be banned. In 1907 Wolseley Italiana entered three x cars under the Wolsit name in the Coppa Florio with just one of them finishing.

== Between the wars ==
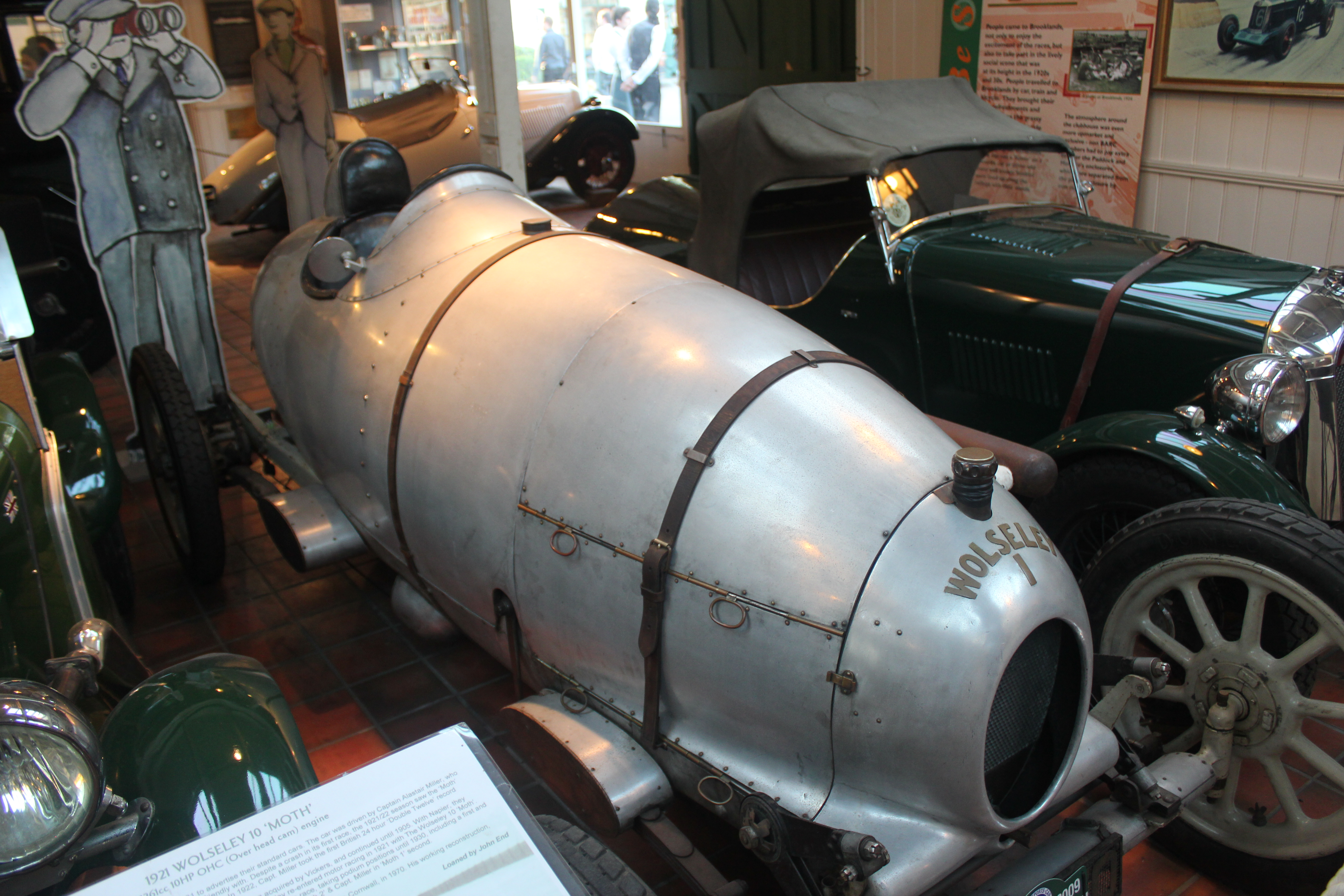
Moth on display at Brooklands

A specific racing department was created in 1920 by Wolseley Managing Director Arthur John McCormack (who had competed in the 1902 Circuit des Ardennes race as a riding mechanic for the winner Charles Jarrott) which resulted in the Wolseley Viper 1 (using a Wolseley Viper engine from an aircraft), Wolseley Moth and Wolseley Hornet six all gaining success in races at Brooklands. The Moth and Hornet were based on commercially available Wolseley cars of the time. The Moth cars were based on the Wolseley 10 or 15 and the Hornet Racer built with a "Special Speed Chassis". Notable drivers of these cars include Woolf Barnato, Kaye Don, Kay Petre, James Robertson Justice and Alastair Miller. It was Miller who set the 1922 British Double-Twelve Record in a Wolseley Moth.

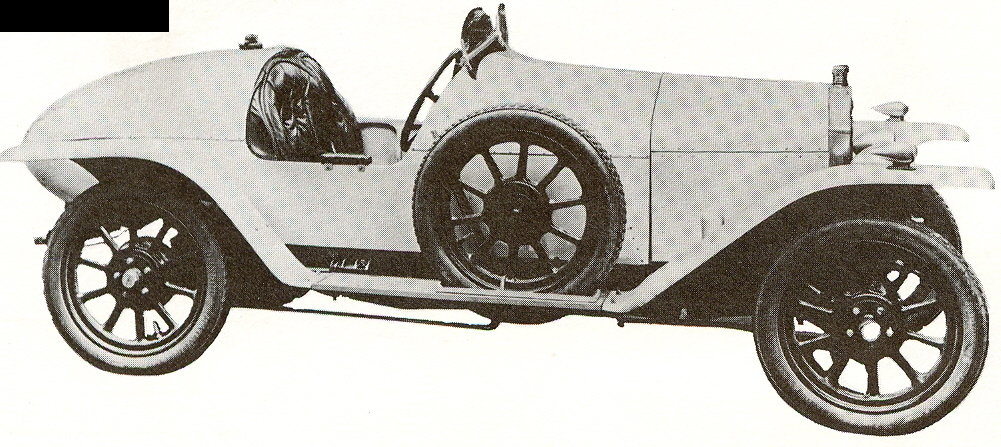
Wolseley Brooklands Racer 1920

== After World War II ==
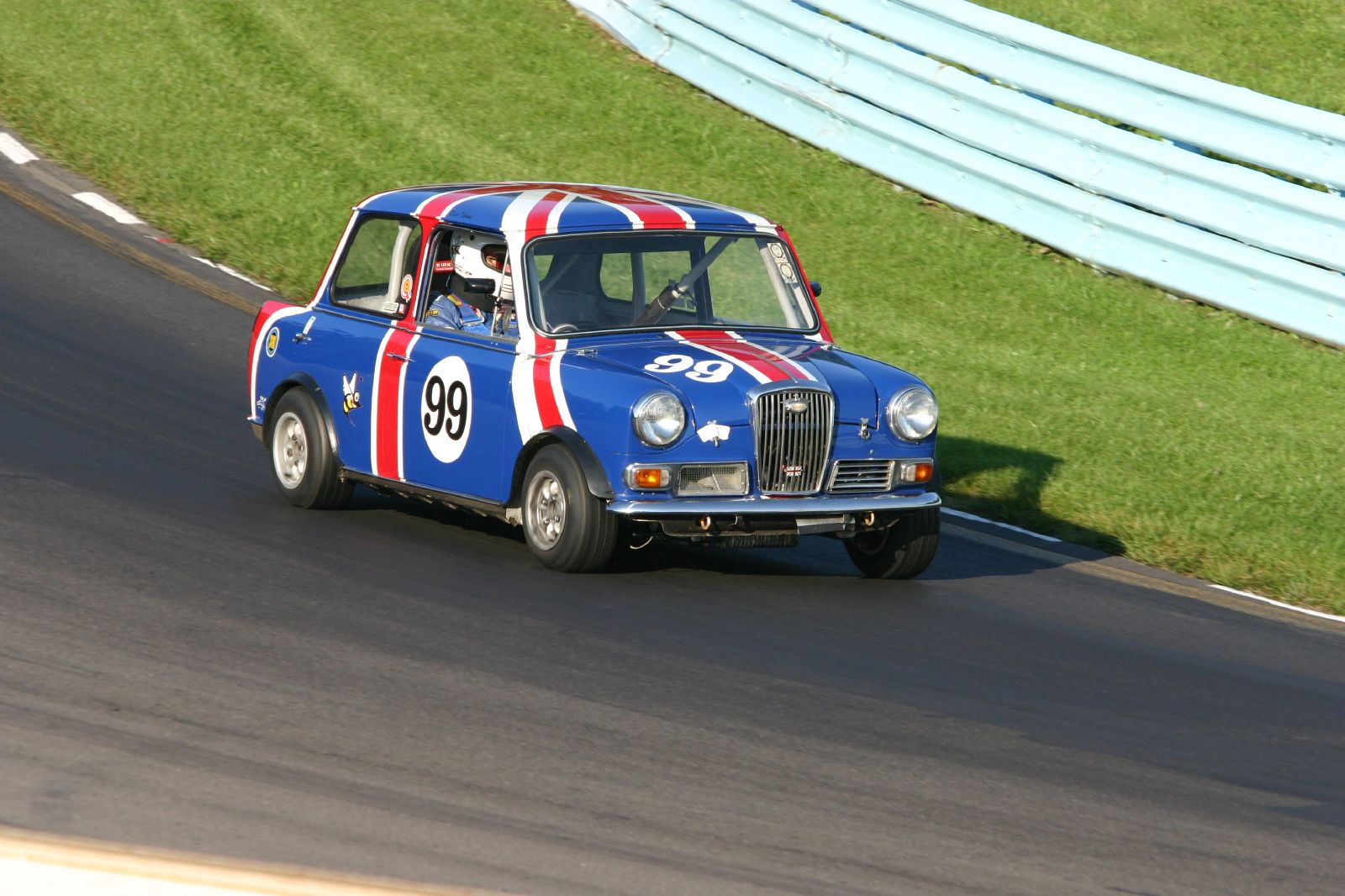
1965 (1310cc) Wolseley Hornet (Mini)

The Wolseley Hornet (Mini) achieved results during the 1960s such as the 1966 and 1967 Leinster Trophy driven by Alec Poole and others until the Wolseley brand was retired in 1969.
