= Donnet-Denhaut flying boat =

DD-2, DD-8, DD-9, DD-10
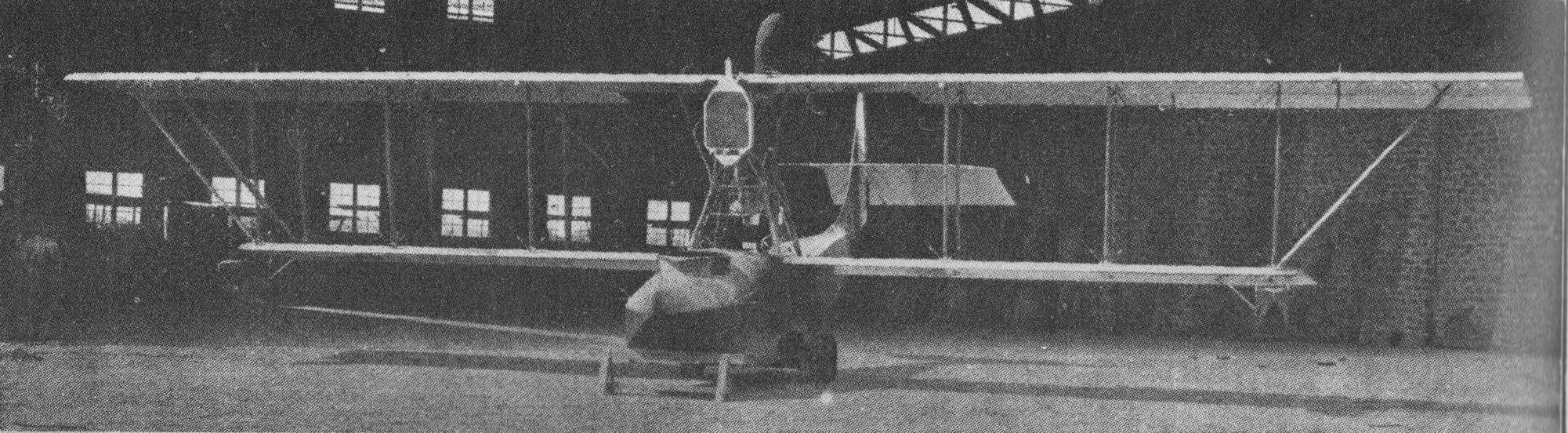

General information
- Type: Patrol flying boat
- Manufacturer: Donnet-Denhaut
- Primary users: French Navy United States Navy, Portuguese Navy
- Number built: ca. 1,085

History
- First flight: 1915

The Donnet-Denhaut flying boat was a maritime patrol and anti-submarine warfare aircraft produced in France during the First World War. Known at the time simply as "Donnet-Denhaut" or "DD" flying boats, the DD-2, DD-8, DD-9, and DD-10 designations were applied retrospectively to denote the various changes in configuration made during their service life.

== Design and development ==
Developed in response to a French Navy requirement, these were biplane flying boats of conventional configuration with two-bay unstaggered wings, and a Salmson R9 160 hp radial engine, mounted pusher-fashion on struts in the interplane gap. The French Navy ordered some 90 aircraft in this original configuration (later dubbed DD-2), and in 1917, requested Donnet-Denhaut to redesign the aircraft to take advantage of the new Hispano-Suiza 8 engine. So equipped, the Navy ordered another 365 machines. In order to take full advantage of the more powerful engine, Donnet-Denhaut increased the wingspan by adding a third bay to the wing cellule and used the extra lift to incorporate a place for a second gunner, bringing the total crew to three. This version (later, the DD-8) became the most produced, with perhaps 500 aircraft built. The DD-8 was also known as the Donnet-Denhaut 300-hp.

Further developments added a second machine gun to each gunner's station (the DD-9) and twin engines mounted in a push-pull configuration (the DD-10). Following the war, a few military surplus DDs were remanufactured as the Donnet HB.3 and operated commercially for a time.

== Operational history ==
Apart from French Navy service, DD flying boats were operated by the United States Navy in Europe, flying from Île-Tudy and Dunkirk to protect convoys from submarines. Some 50 aircraft of this type were purchased, and the first attack (against U-108; unsuccessful) took place on 23 April 1918.

== Operators ==
France

- French Navy

Portugal

- Portuguese Naval Aviation

United States

- United States Navy

== Specifications (DD-8) ==
General characteristics

- Crew: Three
- Length: 10.75 m (35 ft 5 in)
- Wingspan: 16.80 m (55 ft 1 in)
- Height: 3.00 m (9 ft 10 in)
- Wing area: 53.0 m^{2} (570 sq ft)
- Empty weight: 950 kg (2,100 lb)
- Gross weight: 1,800 kg (3,970 lb)
- Powerplant: 1 × Hispano-Suiza 8b , 149 kW (200 hp)

Performance

- Maximum speed: 130 km/h (80 mph, 70 kn)
- Range: 520 km (320 mi, 280 nmi)
- Endurance: 4 hours
- Rate of climb: 2.5 m/s (500 ft/min)

Armament

- 2 × .303 trainable Lewis guns in open cockpits at bow
- 2 × 35 kg (70 lb) bombs

== See also ==
Aircraft of comparable role, configuration, and era

- FBA Type H
- Lohner L

Related lists

- List of maritime patrol aircraft
- List of flying boats and floatplanes
- List of World War I Entente aircraft
