= Donnet =

Automobile manufacturer

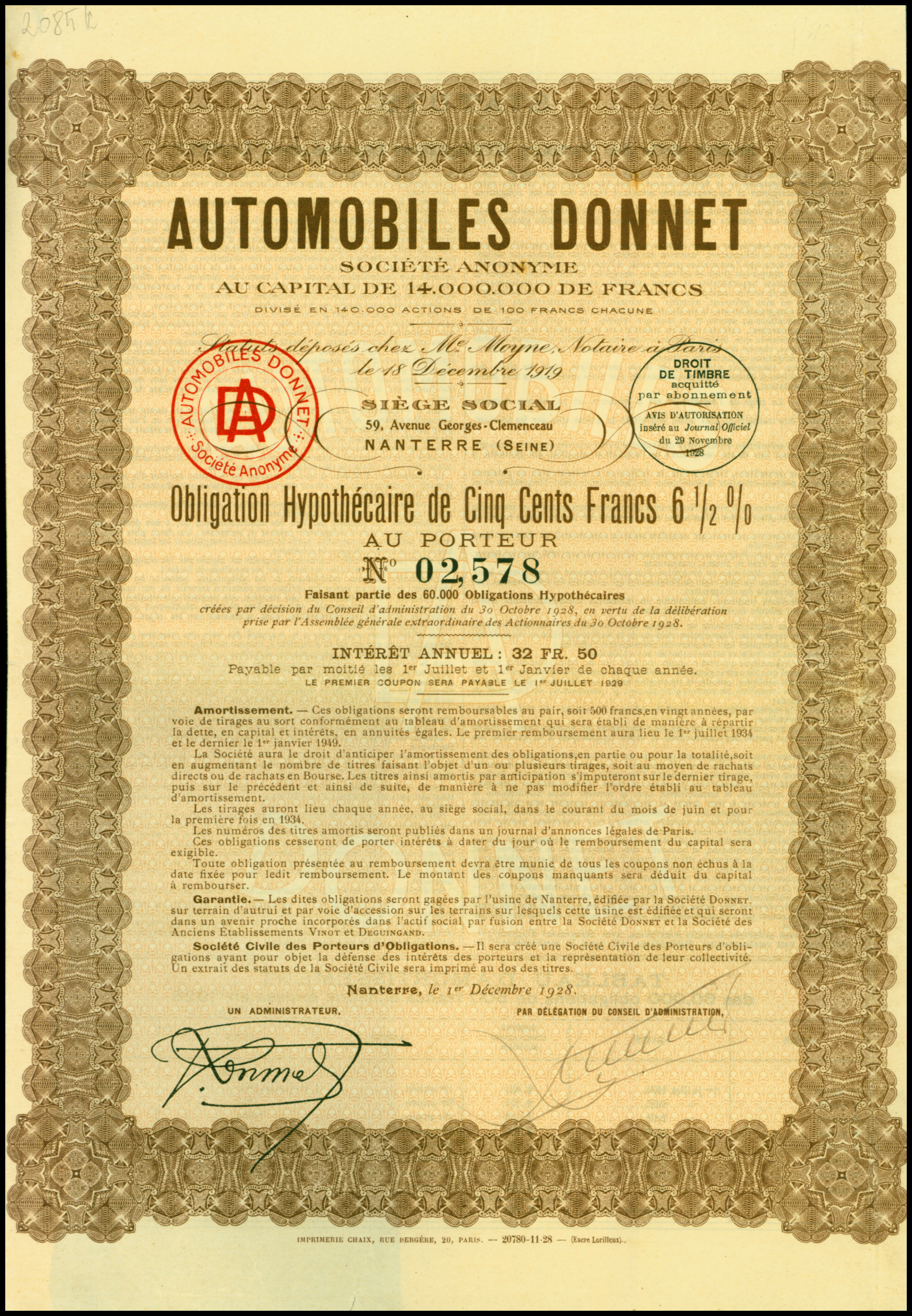
Bond of the Automobiles Donnet SA, issued 1. December 1928

Donnet was a French manufacturing company of the early twentieth century. Founded as Société des Établissements Donnet-Denhaut by Jérôme Donnet (formerly of Donnet-Lévêque) and François Denhaut at Neuilly-sur-Seine in 1914, the firm manufactured a highly successful line of patrol flying boats (the Donnet-Denhaut flying boat series) for the French Navy. The company became known simply as Donnet after designer Denhaut left it in 1919 (replaced by Maurice Percheron), but did not continue to build aircraft for long afterwards.

== History ==
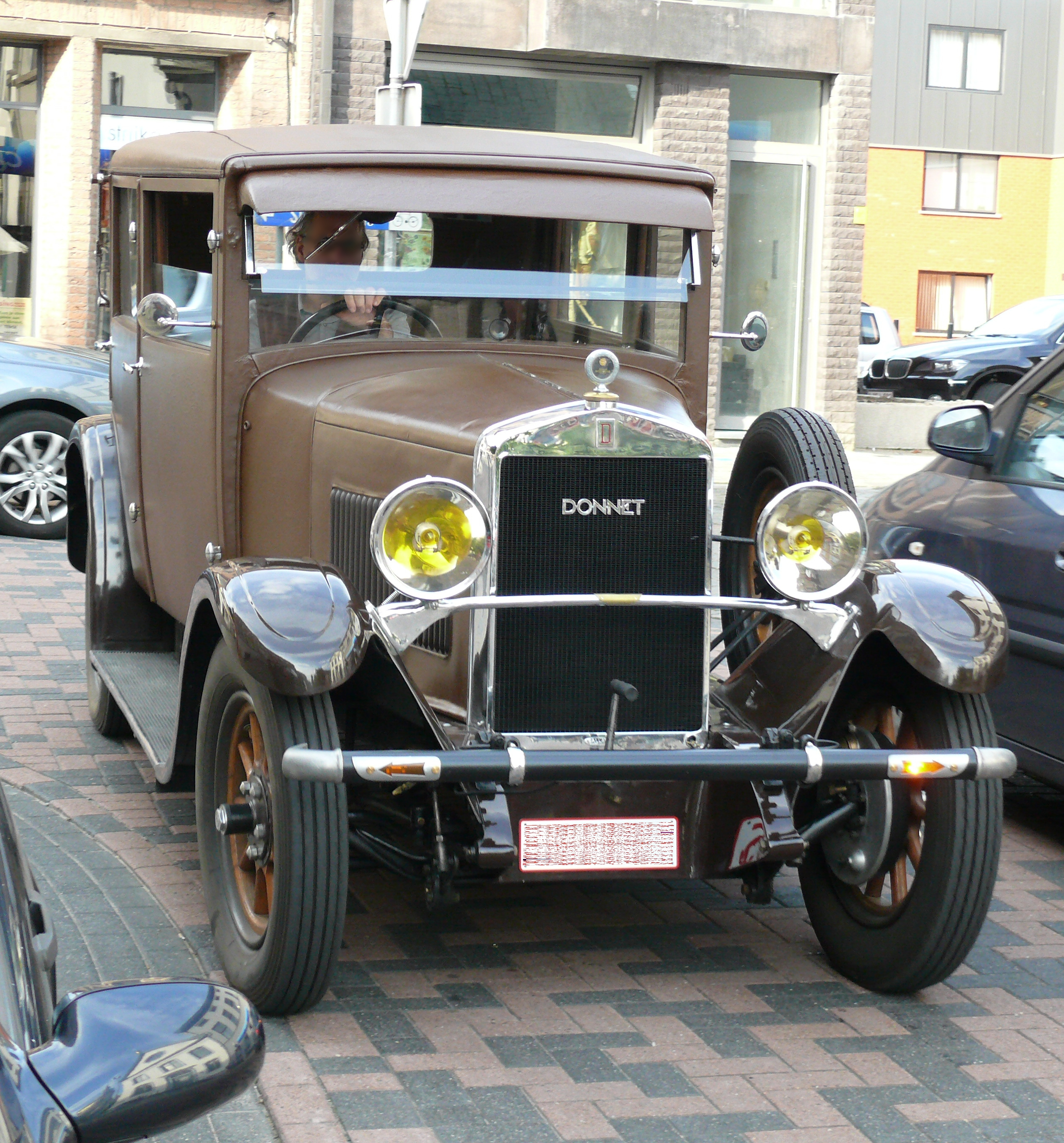
A Donnet Zedel CI6

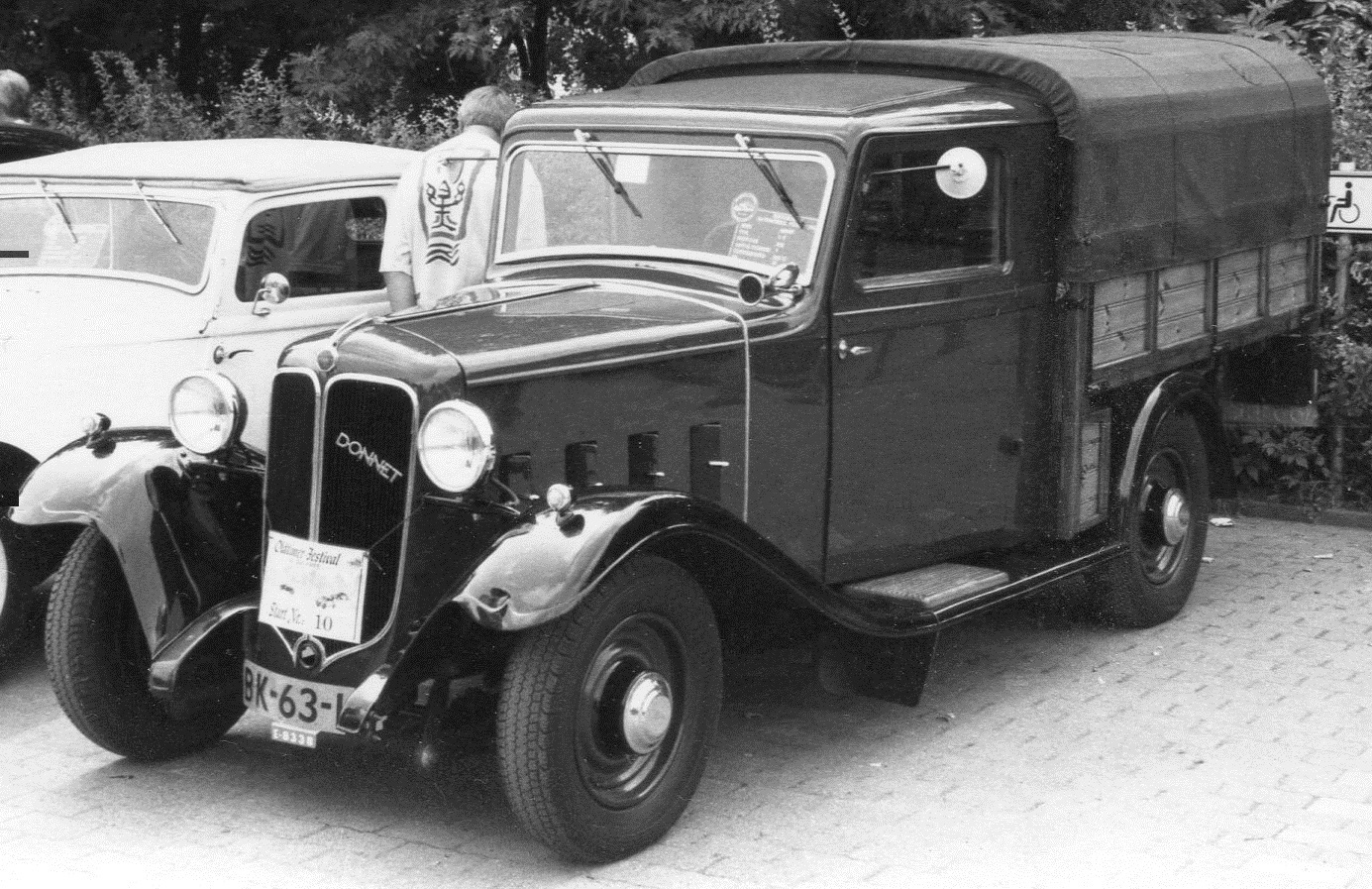
A Donnet pick up

Jérôme Donnet purchased Automobiles Zedel of Pontarlier, Doubs, France in 1919, and changed the name of the enterprise to Donnet-Zedel. From this factory, he made the Donnet-Zedel CI-6 with a 2120 cc engine, a design originating from 1912. A new car, the 1098 cc Type G was introduced in 1925 and it sold well, helping Donnet to become France's fourth largest car maker in 1927. The Type G was made in a former Donnet aircraft factory at Gennevilliers, Seine. Most of the cars produced by Zédel, Donnet-Zédel and Donnet were powered by four-cylinder engines. The Zédel engine had a displacement of 3168 cc, and the Donnet-Zédel 1100 or 2120 cc. The Pontarlier works was sold in 1928 and the Zedel part of the name was dropped. An expanded range of cars appeared as production relocated to the Paris hub in the late 1920s.

Donnet bought another factory at Nanterre, Seine from Vinot et Deguingand early in 1927. The factory although small had room for expansion. By the time of the 25th Paris Motor Show, in October 1931, substantial investment at Nanterre enabled the manufacturer to boast of having the most up-to-date automobile factory in France (...la plus récent des usines d'automobiles françaises...).

At the 1931 motor show, Jérôme Donnet was keen to put behind him the economic troubles that accompanied the Great Depression, and he was promoting a front-wheel drive 11CV design which had been submitted to him by the (already high-profile) automotive engineer Jean-Albert Grégoire. The design used the existing Donnet 1970cc 6-cylinder engine, but this was matched to a well thought through fwd drive-train. The design used a 3,000 mm (120 in) wheelbase and the projected price of 38,900 francs was quite moderate for so modern a car. Nevertheless, the project had not progressed beyond the status of a prototype: the three production models Donnet exhibited in 1931 at the motor show were all conservatively engineered mid-market models, were powered by conventional side-valve engines, and featured the classical rear-wheel drive configuration.

- Donnet 7CV: 4-cylinder 1,324cc, wheelbase 2,875 mm (113.2 in), price 25,900 francs
- Donnet 11CV: 6-cylinder 1,970cc, wheelbase 2,875 mm (113.2 in), price 29,950 francs
- Donnet 14CV: 6-cylinder 2,540cc, wheelbase 3,200 mm (126.0 in), price 38,900 francs

With the acquisition of what had been the Vinot et Deguingand plant at Nanterre, Donnet were able to add what had been the Vinot-Deguingand 4CV to their own range for 1932. The car was powered by a two-stroke 750cc engine that had originally been designed by Marcel Violet. The little car had never been sold in great volume by its previous manufacturer, and rebadged as a Donnet failed to improve its appeal. By October 1933 it was missing from the Donnet stand at the 27th Paris Motor Show, which was in fact the last show to feature the Donnet range.

Although the range in the 1930s included six-cylinder models, new model investment was limited: the great days were over and production ended in 1934. The impressive modern factory at Nanterre was sold to SIMCA at the end of 1934.

One of the best models was a Donnet with a 2540 cc six-cylinder side-valve engine.

== Products ==
=== Aircraft ===
- Donnet-Denhaut flying boat
- Donnet-Leveque Type A
- Donnet-Leveque Type B
- Donnet-Leveque Type C
