= Vinot-Deguingand =

French automobile producer

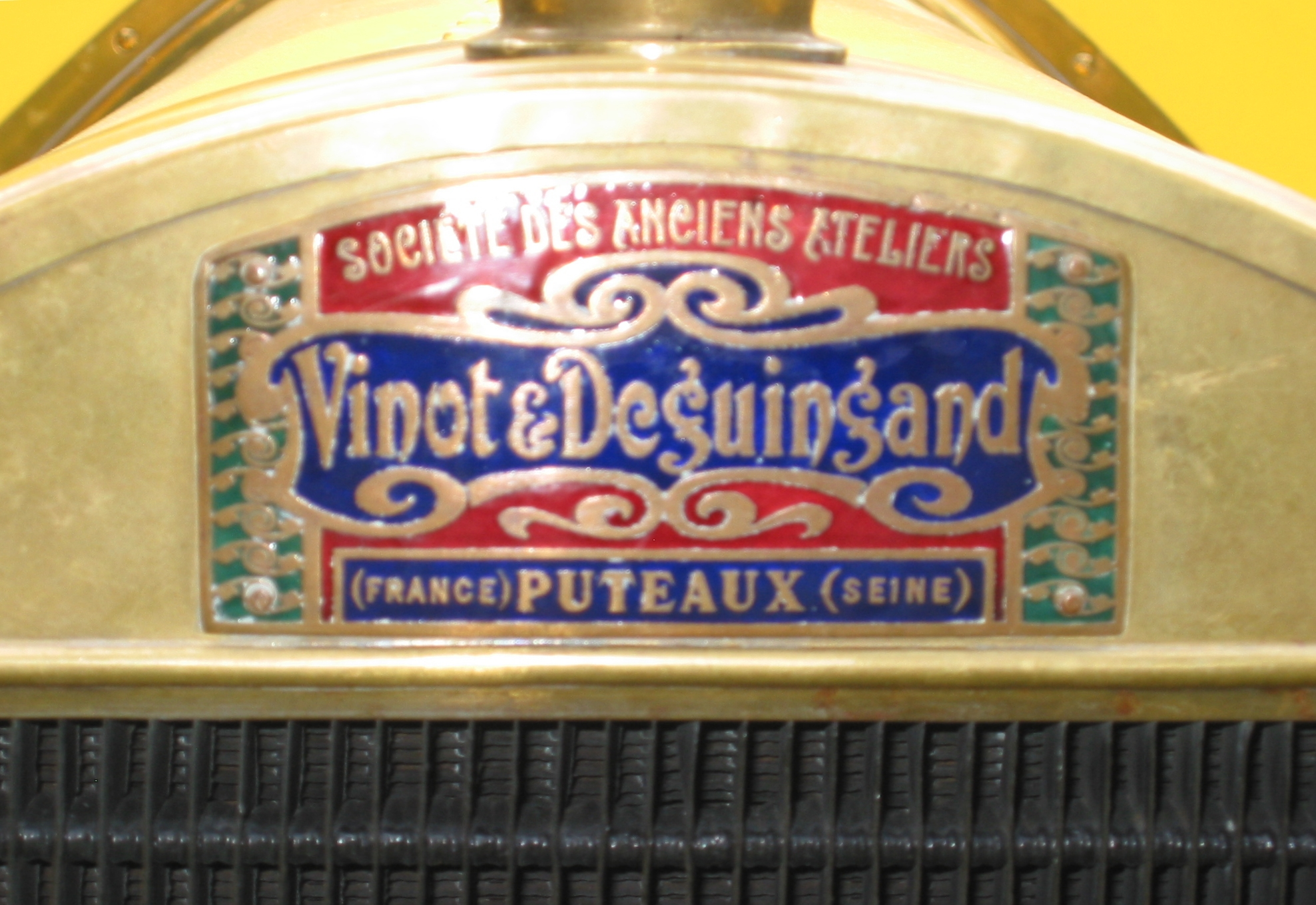

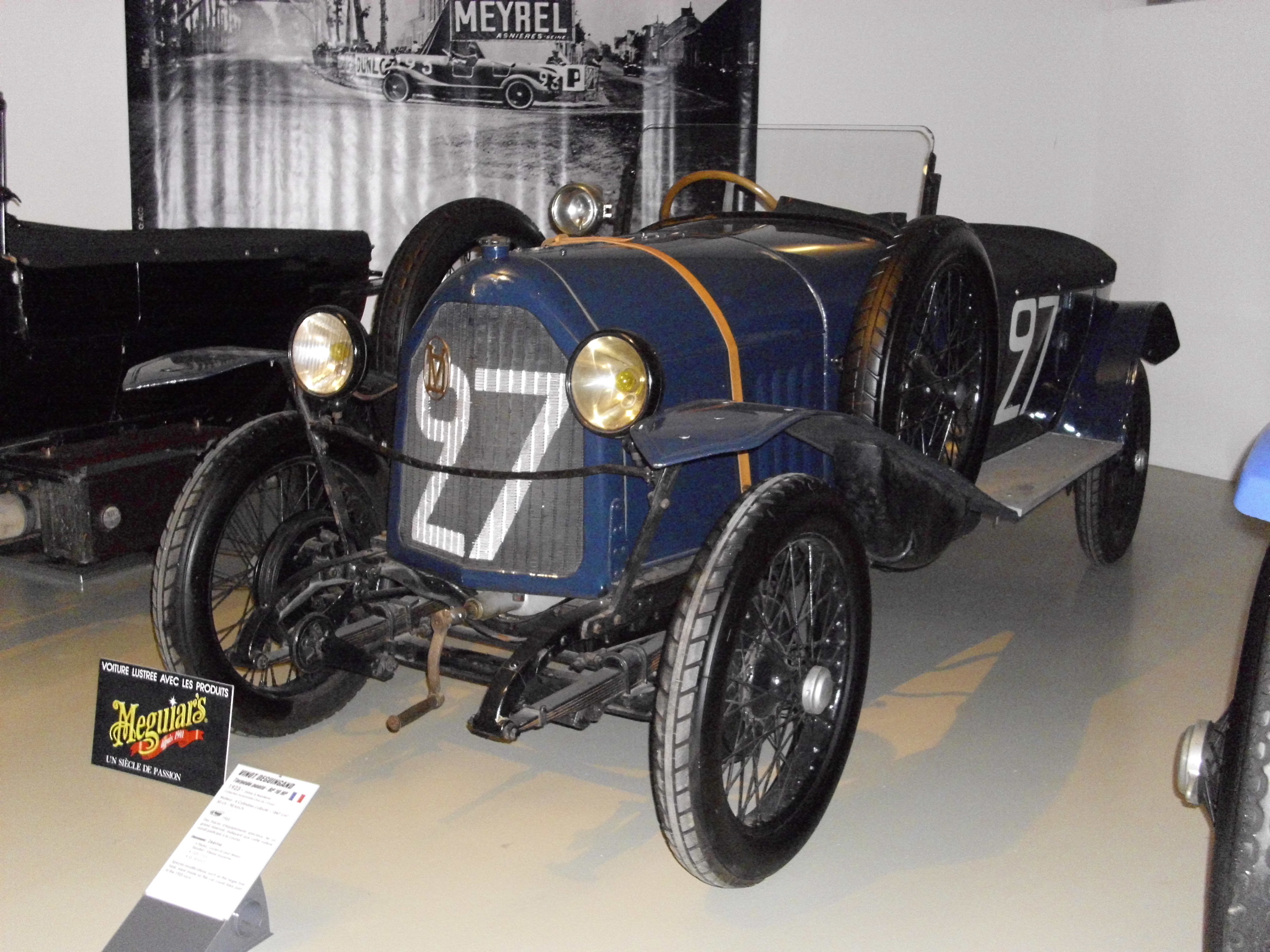
- Industry: Manufacturing
- Founded: 1898 (as a bicycle manufacturer); 1901 (first automobile)
- Defunct: 1926
- Headquarters: Puteaux (1898–1926); Nanterre (1919–1926, France
- Products: Automobiles

Vinot-Deguingand (English: /vɪnˈoʊ dəˌɡænɡɒ̃/, French: [vino dəɡɛ̃ɡɑ̃]) was a French automobile producer.

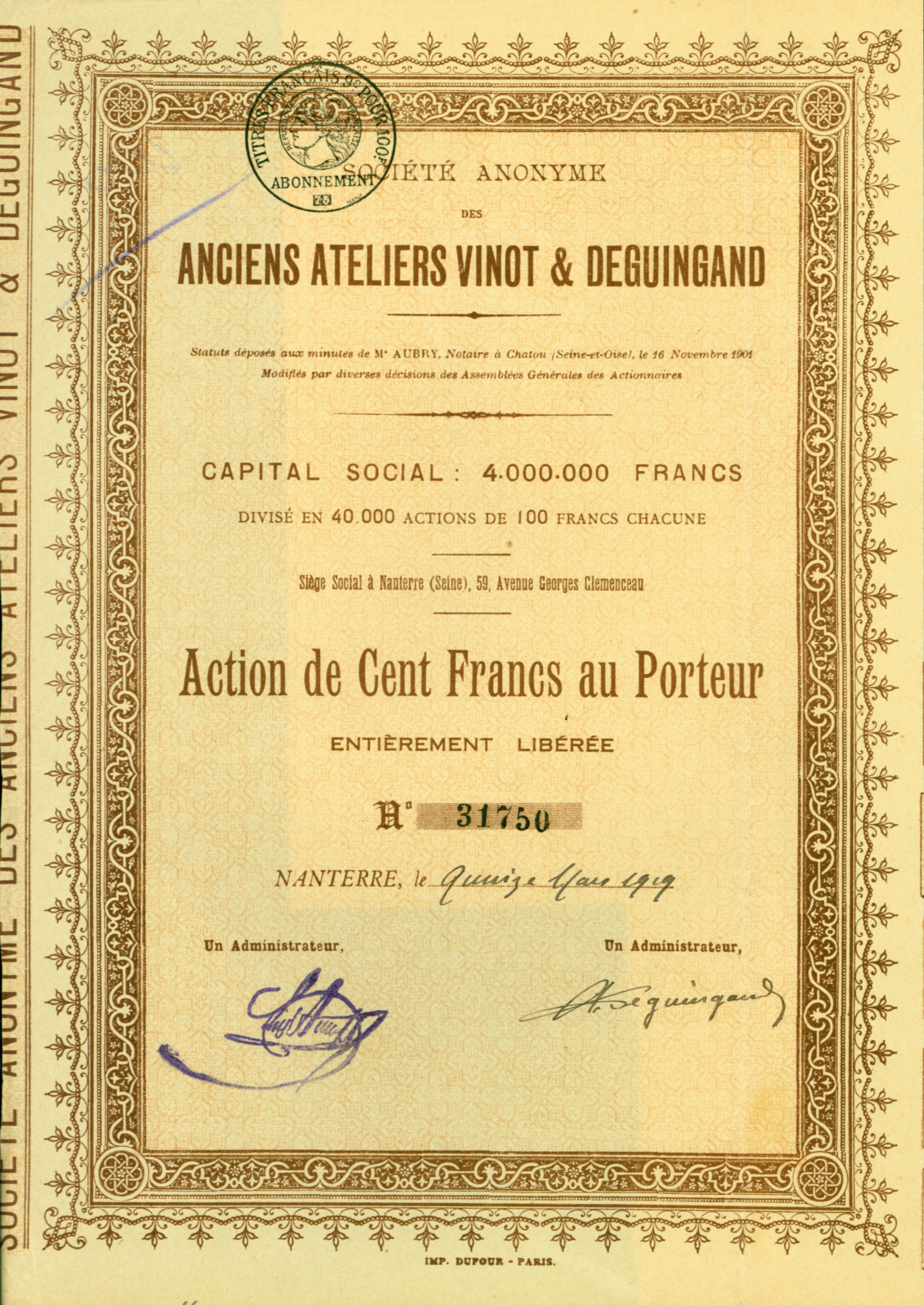
Share of the Anciens Ateliers Vinot & Deguingand, issued 15. March 1919

== History ==
In 1898 Lucien-Marie Vinot-Préfontaine (1858–1915) and Albert Deguingand (1872–1943) founded the business at Puteaux for the manufacture of bicycles. Motor car production began in 1901.

Sources vary about the format of the name – Vinot & Deguingand, Vinot-Deguingand or, from 1907, Vinot.

In 1906 or 1909 Vinot acquired Gladiator and until 1920 two virtually identical ranges were offered with the Vinot and the Gladiator names.

The company also owned a London based subsidiary called "Vinot Cars Ltd" which often provided for Vinots to have their bodywork fitted by locally based English coach-builders. The early cars sold in England were sold under the name "La Silencieuse".

After the war manufacturing activity was transferred to newly acquired premises at Nanterre on the west of Paris. However, production ended in 1926 in response to a falling away in customer demand. The factory was sold to Donnet-Zédel. It was later sold to Henri Pigozzi and became the principal production location for Simca-Fiat (subsequently Simca)

Lucien-Marie Vinot-Préfontaine having died in 1915, Albert Deguingand in 1927 founded another auto-maker, named Société des Nouveaux Ateliers A. Deguingand, which would last till 1929 or 1930.

== Automobiles ==
The first car had a twin-cylinder 1500cc engine and chain drive. In 1903 the twin cylinder model was designated as the manufacturer's "10CV" model, and was joined by a four cylinder 3300cc "H14CV" and a "F18CV". The 5800cc "30CV" followed in 1905, joined in 1906 by the manufacturer's first six-cylinder car.

The range for 1908 comprised a "10/14CV" and a "16/24CV". A "24CV" with a 4-litre engine was added in 1910. The range in 1914 involved cars with engine sizes of 1700cc, 2100cc, 2600cc and 4200cc.

Less than a year following the outbreak of peace, in October 1919 the manufacturer took a stand at the 15th Paris Motor Show and exhibited the 12CV Vinot-Deguignand Type BO, which sat on a 3,030 mm (119.3 in) wheelbase and was powered by a 4-cylinder engine of 2603cc.

== Competition ==
A team from Vinot & Deguingand took part in the inaugural 1923 Le Mans 24 Hour race. The brothers Léon and Lucien Molon completed 77 laps in a 10HP Vinot & Deguingand Type BP. This total was 51 laps behind the race leader and sufficient for 26th place overall and 6th place in the 2.0 classification.

== Reading list ==
- Harald Linz, Halwart Schrader: Die Internationale Automobil-Enzyklopädie. United Soft Media Verlag, München 2008, ISBN 978-3-8032-9876-8. (German)
- George Nick Georgano (Chefredakteur): The Beaulieu Encyclopedia of the Automobile. Volume 3: P–Z. Fitzroy Dearborn Publishers, Chicago 2001, ISBN 1-57958-293-1. (English)
- George Nick Georgano: Autos. Encyclopédie complète. 1885 à nos jours. Courtille, Paris 1975. (French)
