= 1912 Grand Prix season =

Grand Prix season

Seasons
- ← 1911 1913 →

The 1912 Grand Prix season saw Grand Prix motor racing in Europe and the United States. The growing economic confidence and interest from car manufacturers saw bigger fields and more races in the season. The French Grand Prix was held for the first time since 1908 and staged at Dieppe. The American Grand Prize was held in Milwaukee, moving from its previous home in Savannah.

Peugeot was the team to beat this year, with their new twin-cam 7.6-litre L-76. In the French Grand Prix, after American David Bruce-Brown’s FIAT had retired after leading for most of the two-day race, victory went to the Peugeot of Georges Boillot. Team-mate Jules Goux repeated the success at the Coupe de la Sarthe held at Le Mans. The Peugeot voiturettes had also won at Le Mans and Ostende. However, it was a British Sunbeam that was first voiturette home at Dieppe.

In the three big races in the United States Joe Dawson won the second running of the Indianapolis 500. Ralph DePalma beat a small field in the Vanderbilt Cup. In the American Grand Prize held over the same weekend, rising star David Bruce-Brown was killed in practice while Caleb Bragg won the race in a FIAT S74. This year no European drivers travelled across the Atlantic for the events. With four victories over the season, Ralph DePalma driving a Mercedes, was acclaimed as the AAA national champion for the year.

== Major races ==
Date	Name	Circuit	Race Regulations	Race Distance	Winner’s Time	Winning driver	Winning constructor	Report
25-26 May	(Italy) VII Targa Florio (Giro di Sicilia)	Sicily	Targa Florio	980 km	24h 37m	(United Kingdom) Cyril Snipe	SCAT 25/35	Report
30 May	(United States) II Indianapolis 500	Indianapolis	AAA	500 miles	6h 21m	(United States) Joe Dawson	National	Report
25–26 June	(France) XII French Grand Prix	Dieppe	Formula Libre	1540 km	13h 58m	(France) Georges Boillot	Peugeot L-76	Report
25–26 June	(France) VII Coupe des Voiturettes (Coupe de l’Auto)	Dieppe	Voiturette	1540 km	14h 39m	(France) Victor Rigal	Sunbeam	Report
9 September	II Grand Prix de France (Coupe de la Sarthe)	Le Mans	Formula Libre	650 km	5h 32m	(France) Jules Goux	Peugeot L-76	Report
9 September	Grand Prix de France - Voiturettes	Le Mans	Voiturette	650 km	6h 12m	(Italy) Paolo Zuccarelli	Lion-Peugeot L3	Report
2 October	(United States) VIII Vanderbilt Cup	Milwaukee	AAA	300 miles	4h 21m	(United States) Ralph DePalma	Mercedes GP	Report
5 October	(United States) IV American Grand Prize	Milwaukee	Formula Libre	410 miles	5h 59m	(United States) Caleb Bragg	FIAT S74	Report
3 November	(Belgium) III Coupe d’Ostende	Ostende	Formula Libre	1200 km	3h 52m	(France) René Thomas	Lion-Peugeot L3	Report

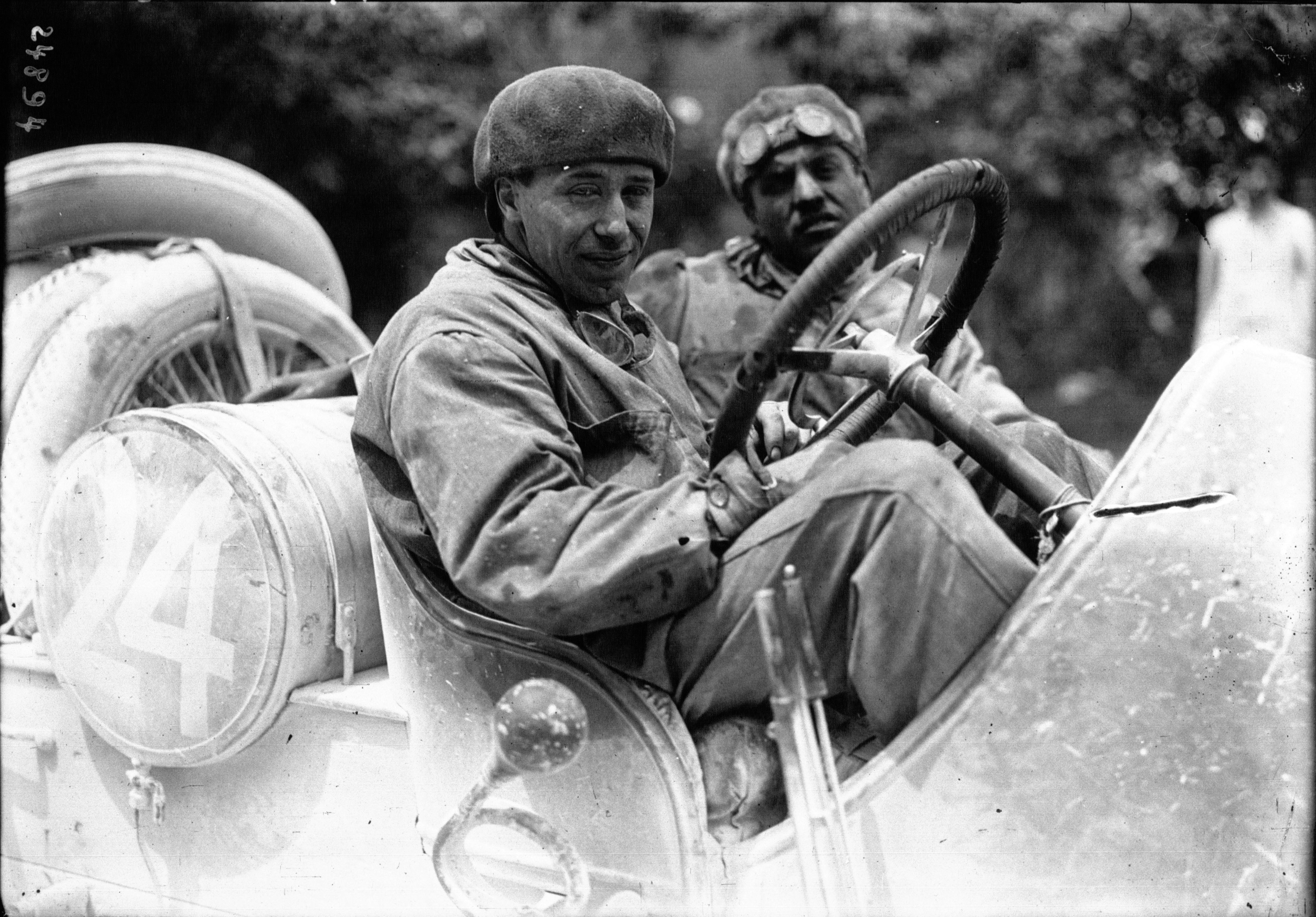
Snipe and Pedrini, winners of the Targa Florio for SCAT

== Technical ==
Basic attempts at aerodynamics appeared this season, as cars started to shape their tail sections to cover the fueltanks and spare tyres.

At Peugeot, the three driver-engineers Georges Boillot, Jules Goux and Paolo Zuccarelli (dubbed “The Charlatans”) had worked with Ernest Henry and produced their first design. Fellow Peugeot-engineer Ettore Bugatti had also produced a design and the two had a run-off. The drivers’ car was comfortably faster, reaching 160 km/h (99 mph), built with a four-cylinder 7.6L engine. The innovative twin-overhead camshaft, with four valves per cylinder, developed 148 bhp revving at 2200rpm. This was equivalent to nearly 20 bhp per litre and 50% higher than the performance of its main rival, the Fiat S74, that only gave 13 bhp per litre at a leisurely 1600rpm over its 14.1 litre engine. Although some of the ideas were not new, it was Peugeot that combined them and pioneered the use of hemispherical combustion chambers. There is some evidence that Zuccarelli got the ideas from his former work at Hispano-Suiza and that legal action was taken for breach of patent. The Peugeot engine became the template for race-engines for many years.

In the United States, the first cars built specifically for racing appeared from Mercer, Stutz and the Mason of the Duesenberg brothers, to take on the stock chassis.

== Season review ==
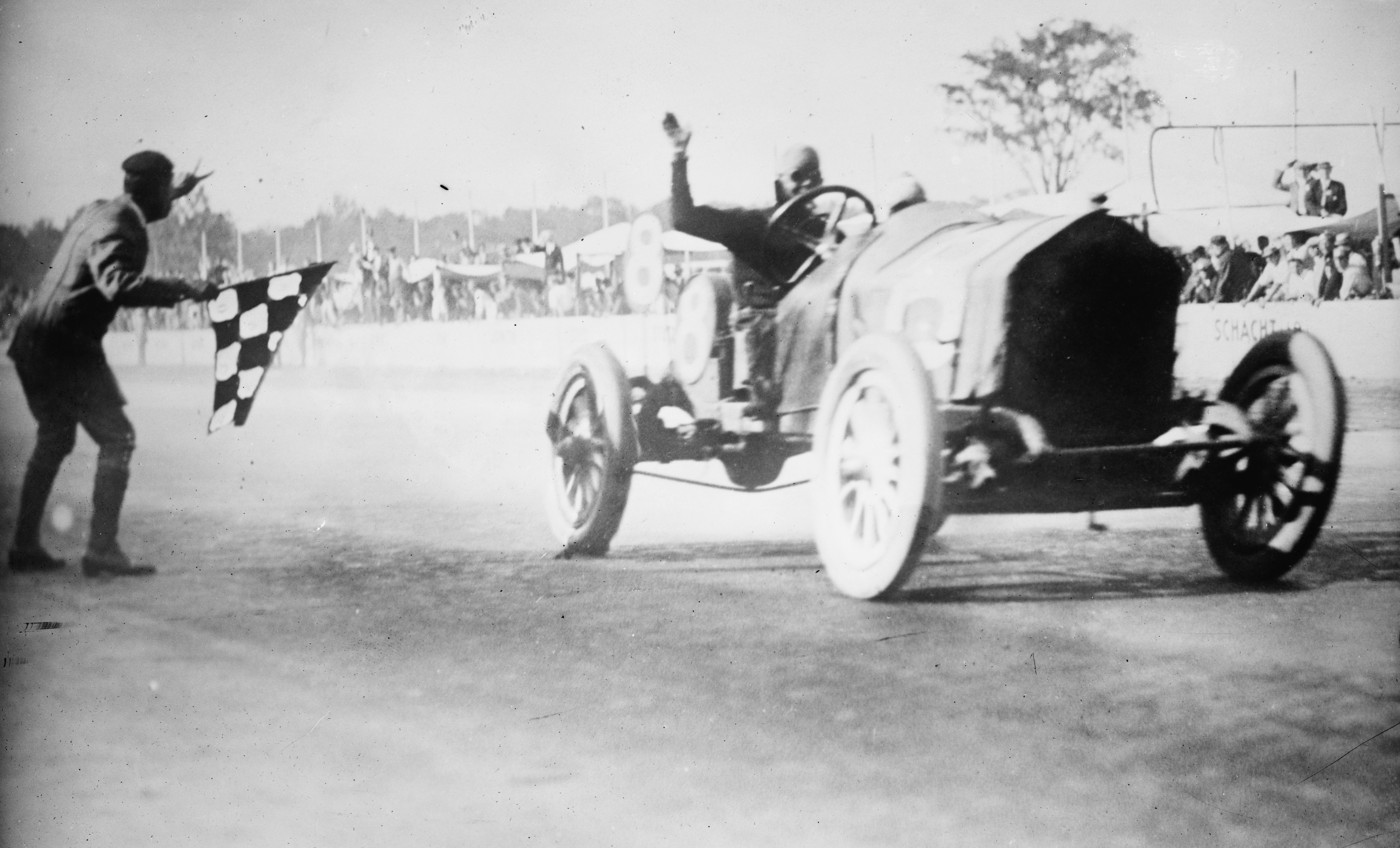
Joe Dawson winning the Indy 500

The season started in Italy with the Targa Florio. After damage to the Madonie circuit in the previous year, the race instead became a tour on the coastal roads around Sicily, as the Giro di Sicilia. A good field of 16 cars arrived in Palermo for the clockwise course around the island. This allayed organiser Vincenzo Florio’s fears that his race was fading to obscurity. Englishman Cyril Snipe, racing for the SCAT team, built up a considerable lead. Learning in Trapani, the second to last checkpoint, that he had an eighty-minute lead he told his co-driver Pedrini that “twenty minutes will be enough” and stopped to have a meal and a sleep at a hotel for an hour. Pedrini managed to rouse his teammate in time and they reached Palermo again to win with a half-hour margin over the Lancia of Giordano, after a 24-hour journey.

Ralph DePalma and mechanic Rupert Jeffkins, pushing their Mercedes down the Indianapolis front straight

The organisers of the Indianapolis 500 doubled the prizemoney on offer from $27550 in 1911 up to $52225 including $20000 for the winner. The race was run to the same specifications, however after Harroun’s effort the previous year, riding mechanics were now mandatory. Although the Mason did not qualify, both the Mercer and Stutz did. David Bruce-Brown in a FIAT had the fastest lap in practice, while Gil Andersen drew pole position. A number of American factory entries were present as well as three privateer entries in European cars: Americans Spencer Wishart and Ralph DePalma in Mercedes and Teddy Tetzlaff in a FIAT. Tetzlaff took the lead initially, until DePalma passed him on the third lap. He continued to lead right up until the engine failed with only two laps to go. With over a three-lap lead, DePalma and his mechanic got out and pushed the car down the front straight to the cheers of the 80000 spectators, but to no avail. Joe Dawson overtook him to take the victory in a National. Race rules stipulated that drivers had to complete all 200 laps to be classified and receive prizemoney. Tetzlaff, helped by Caleb Bragg, came home second ten minutes later, with Hughes (Mercer) and Merz (Stutz) in third and fourth respectively. Ralph Mulford, second the previous year, finished last over 2½ hours after Dawson. Reputedly even stopping to change his shock absorbers and have a chicken dinner, he crossed the line in front of empty grandstands. Even the organisers had left. He completed the slowest ever 500 miles in the race. Two other records were set where DePalma had led the longest distance without winning (196 laps) and Dawson led the least to win (2 laps) until 2011.

The French Automobile Club (ACF) revived its Grand Prix this year. Once again it was staged over two long days – over 1500km – at Dieppe, where the last Grand Prix had been held in 1908. To encourage entrants, the organisers used Formula Libre (open) regulations with the only restriction being that cars must be no wider than 1.75 metres. They also decided to run the Coupe des Voiturettes (3-litres or less) concurrently with the larger cars. Fourteen Grand Prix cars and 33 voiturettes were entered. The “Charlatans” arrived with their three new Peugeot L-76s. The strongest challengers were the three FIAT S74s for Louis Wagner and Americans Ralph DePalma and David Bruce-Brown. There were also teams from Rolland-Pilain, Lorraine-Dietrich and a six-cylinder Belgian Excelsior. An entry from Mercedes was rejected by the organisers on the pretext that the entry was filed by the manufacturer’s Belgian agency and not the company itself.

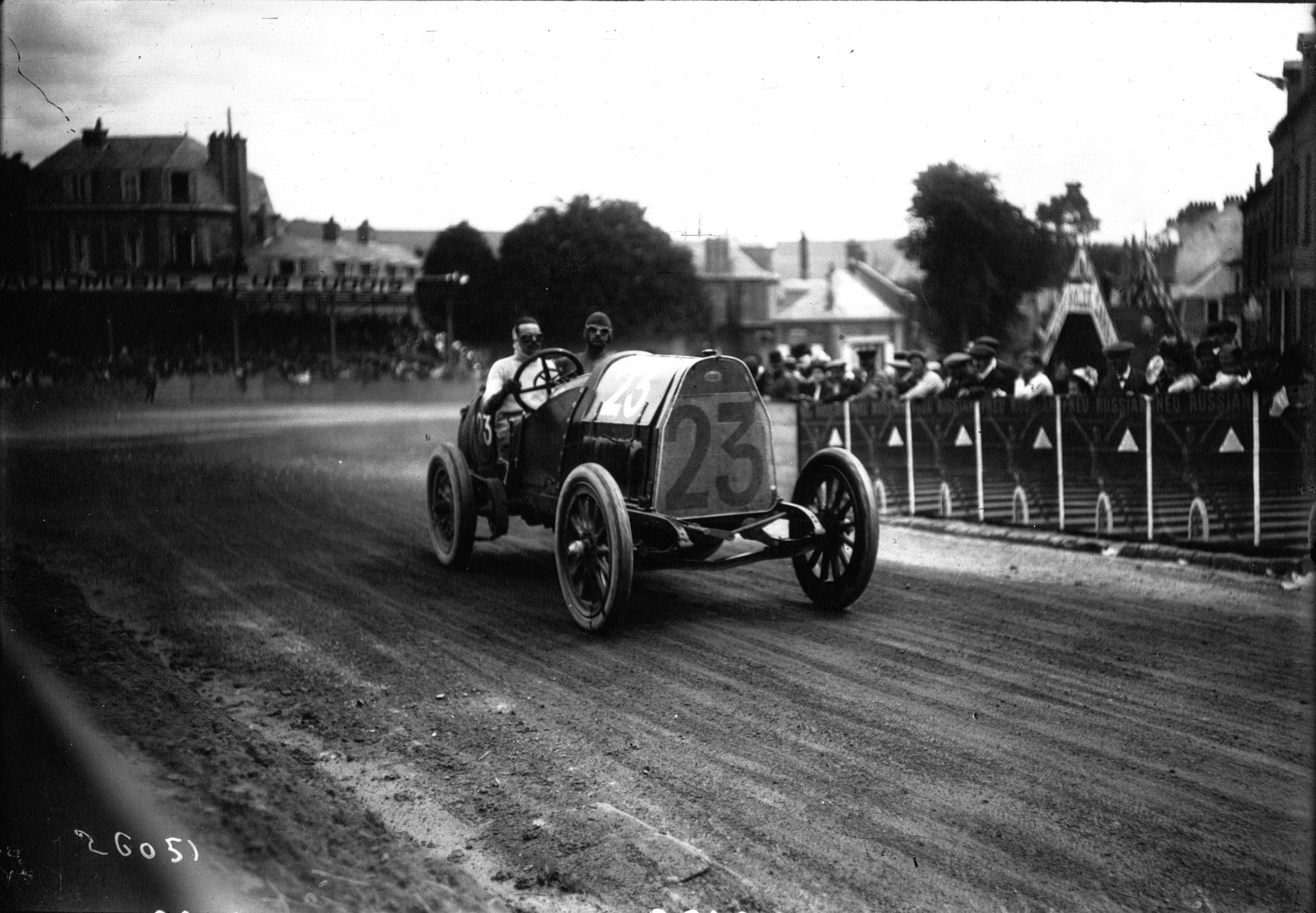
Louis Wagner, FIAT. French GP

With Peugeot devoting its energy to its Grand Prix cars, they only had a single voiturette entry for René Thomas. Ranged against him were a number of teams from France (including Sizaire-Naudin, Grégoire and Th. Schneider) and Great Britain (Sunbeam, Vauxhall and others).

Boillot had put in the fastest lap time in practice. The race started at 5.30am with Victor Rigal’s Sunbeam leading out the voiturettes and Victor Hémery’s Lorraine the first of the Grand Prix cars. Bruce-Brown set the pace, running ahead of Boillot then Wagner. But although the FIATs were faster the Peugeots had much more efficient pit-stops with their knock-off wheel-hubs to change tyres and a pressure-system to refuel. Zuccarelli went out with ignition problems and both Goux and DePalma were disqualified for refuelling away from the pits when they ran out of petrol. After 10 laps and 6½ hours racing at the end of the first day, Bruce-Brown had a two-minute lead over Boillot with Wagner in third. A surprising fourth was Dario Resta in the small Sunbeam.

There was bad weather on the second day. Overnight one of the Lorraine-Dietrichs had caught fire and the Grégoire team had been withdrawn. Bruce-Brown continued his lead through the morning but on the 15th lap he stopped out on the track with a broken fuel tank after hitting an errant dog. This left Boillot with a comfortable lead over Wagner, but on the penultimate lap the Peugeot’s universal joint seized up. He and his mechanic spent twenty minutes to get going again, albeit with only second and fourth gears. In the end they won by thirteen minutes from Wagner. Rigal was an impressive third in the Sunbeam to win the Coupe des Voiturettes. He was just forty minutes behind Boillot, with team-mates Resta and Médinger in fourth and fifth.

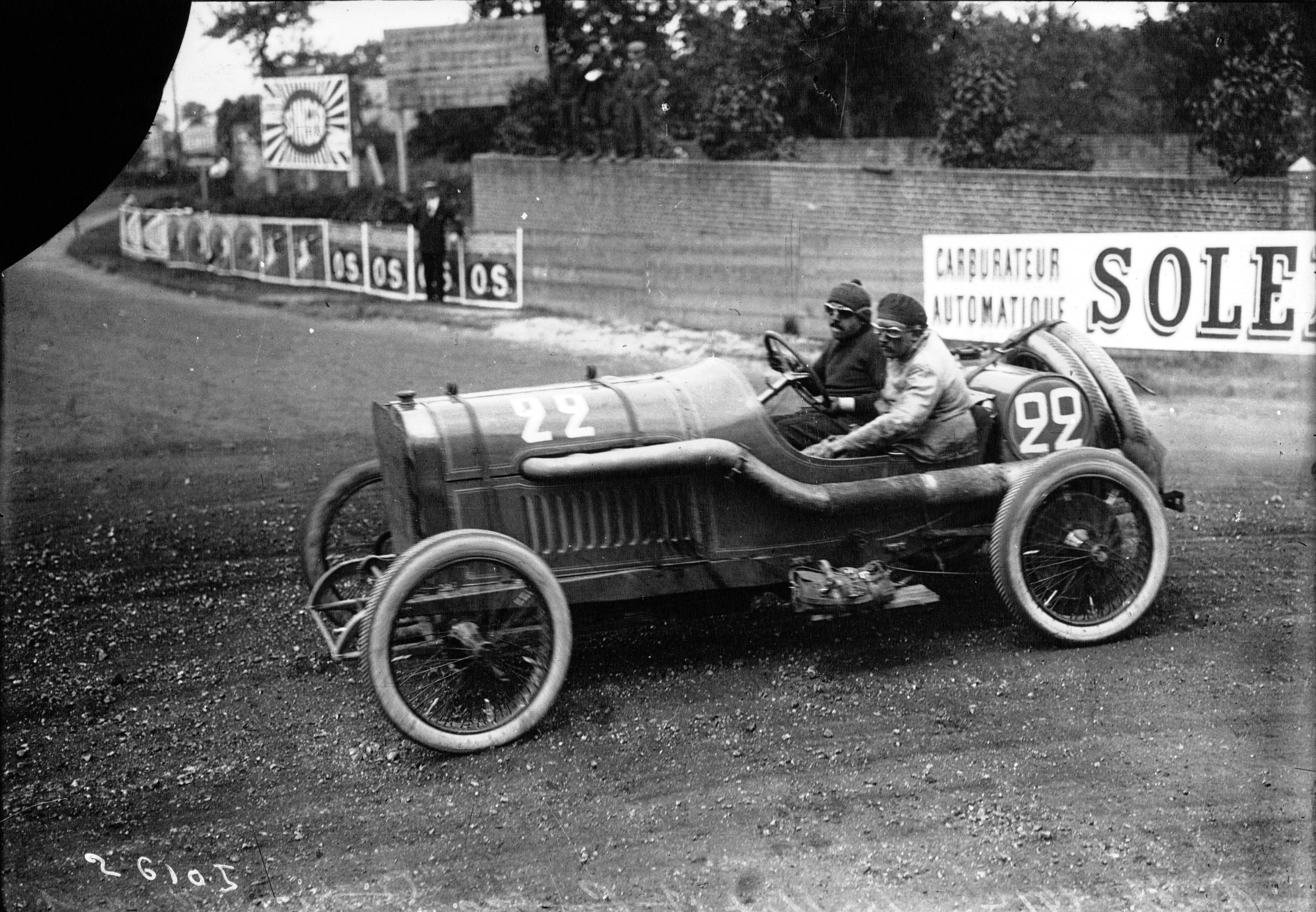
Georges Boillot, Peugeot. French GP

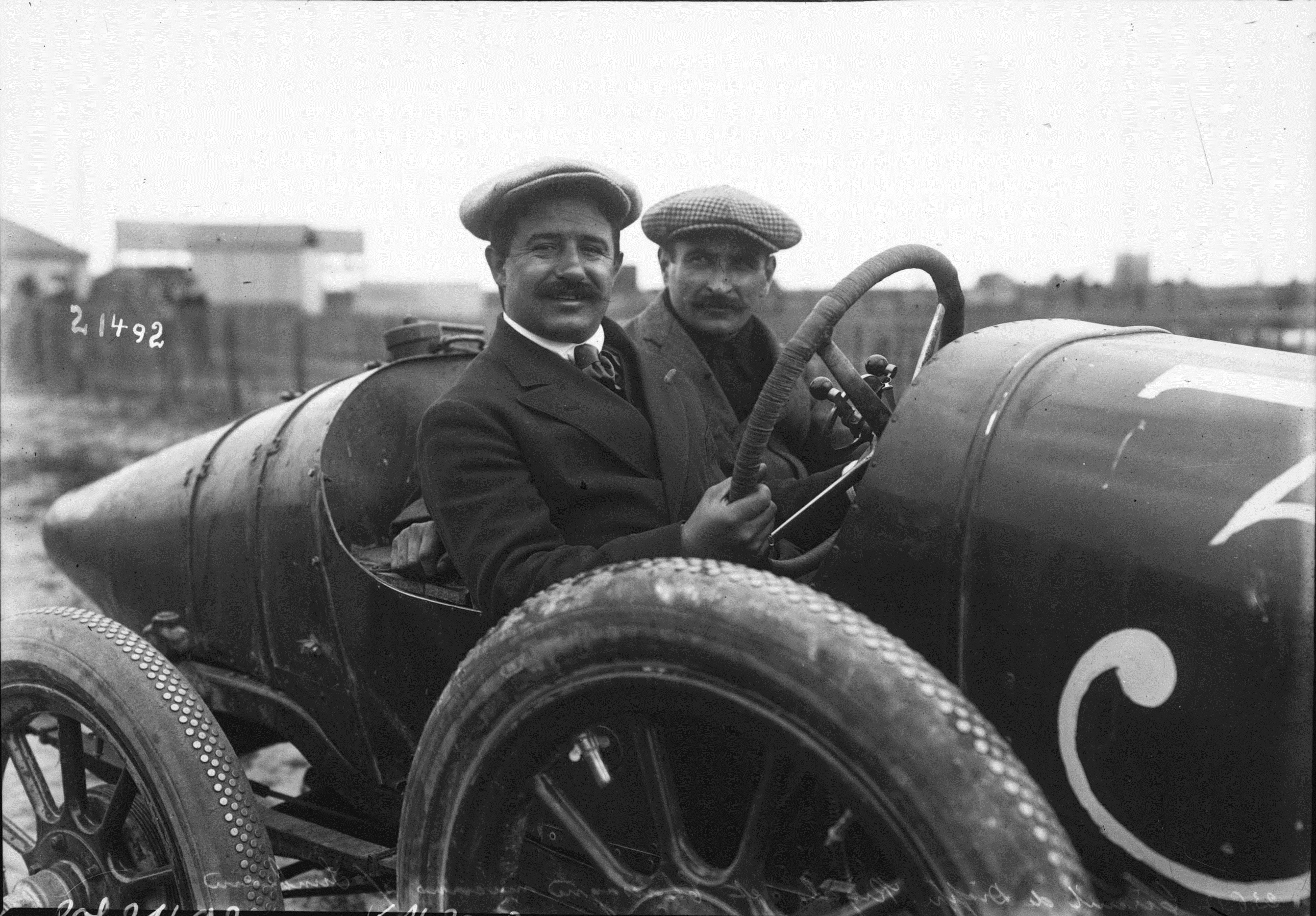
Victor Rigal, Sunbeam. French GP

Once again the AC de la Sarthe et de l’Ouest(forerunner of the Automobile Club de l'Ouest) organised its own event – the Grand Prix of France, also known as the Coupe de le Sarthe, and not to be confused with the Grand Prix run by the ACF. It used the same course as the previous year, but this time ran in a clockwise direction. Both Grand Prix and voiturette cars were entered. However the only large race-cars to arrive were the works Peugeots of Boillot and Goux, and a SPA. Many of the French voiturette teams at Dieppe were entered and this time both Thomas and Zuccarelli with the Lion-Peugeot L3.

When Boillot retired after five laps with a water leak, it left Goux with an easy victory. Forty minutes back in second was Zuccarelli then René Champoiseau in a Th. Schneider.

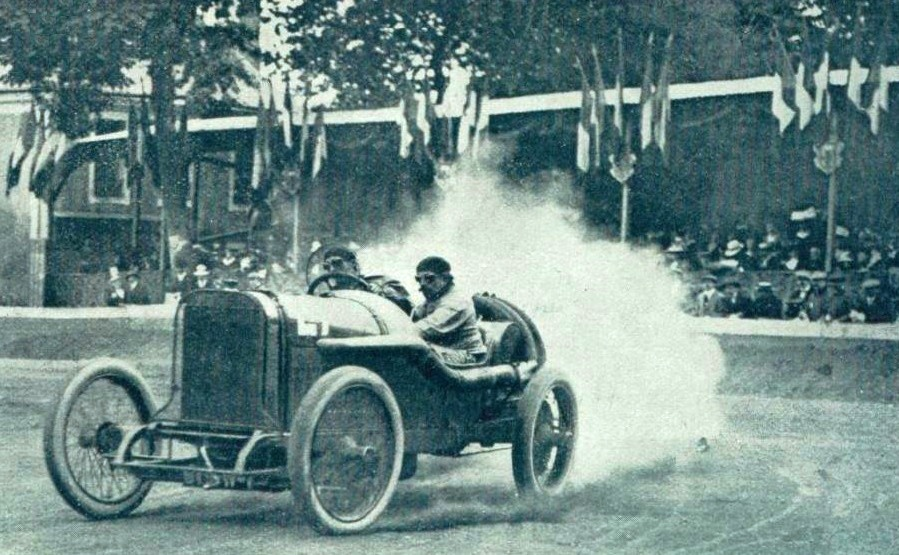
Jules Goux, winner of the Coupe de la Sarthe for Peugeot

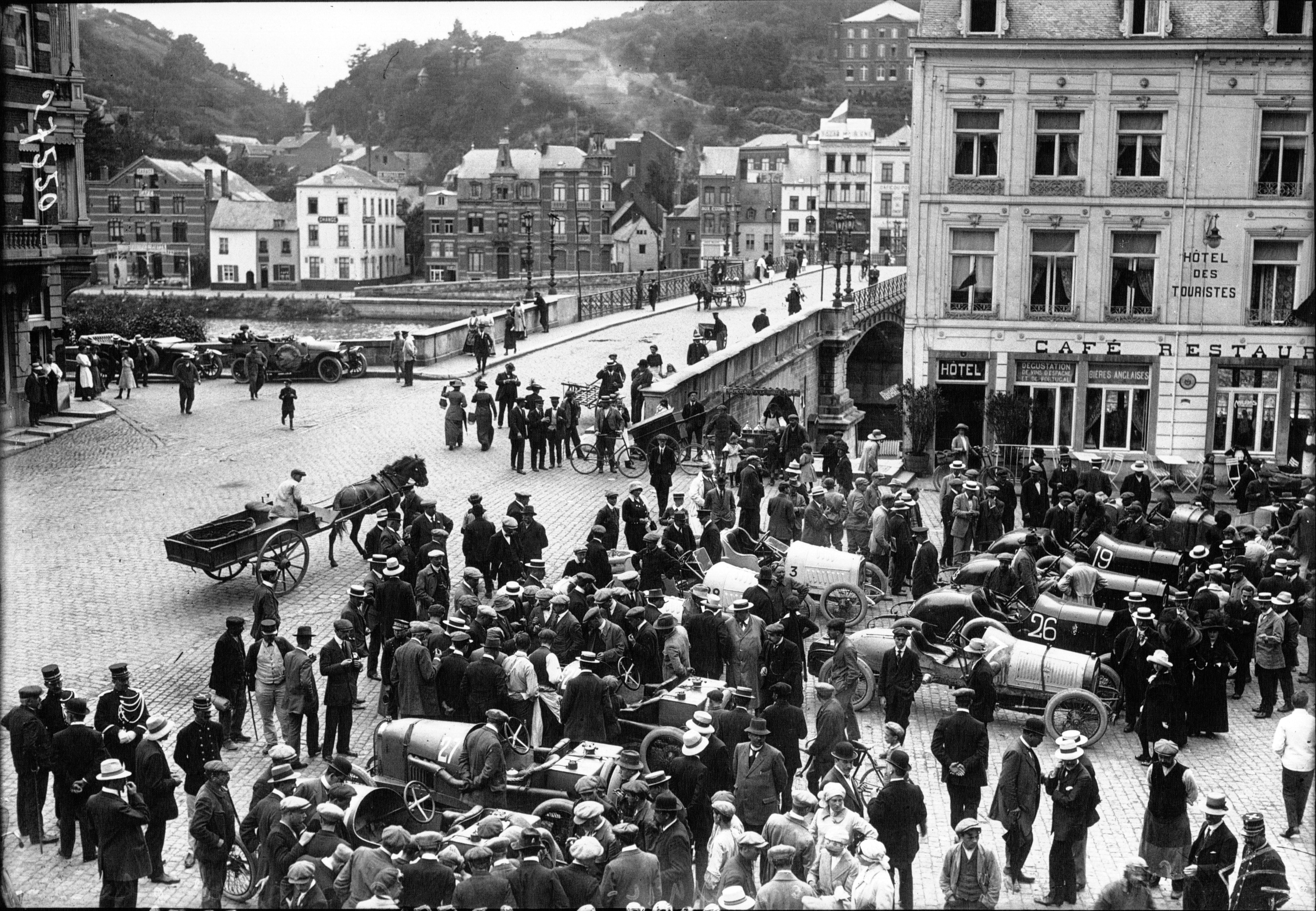
Before the start at Ostend, for the Belgian Auto Club’s race

The premier American races, the Vanderbilt Cup and American Grand Prize had been held previously at Savannah, Georgia. However, controversy over the organisers using convict labour to prepare the track and local militia to police the event meant they declined to host the events this year. The new venue chosen was at Milwaukee. However, dubious land-sales of the grandstand/pit area by speculators to get rich off the event meant it was again moved to nearby Wauwatosa.

Eight cars entered the Vanderbilt Cup, and only two were modified ‘stock’ cars. Gil Anderson’s Stutz and Hugh Hughes’ Mercer challenged the three Mercedes (led by Ralph DePalma) and the FIAT of Teddy Tetzlaff. DePalma gave Mercedes its first win in the event after seven attempts. Second was Hughes and third was Spencer Wishart in another Mercedes.

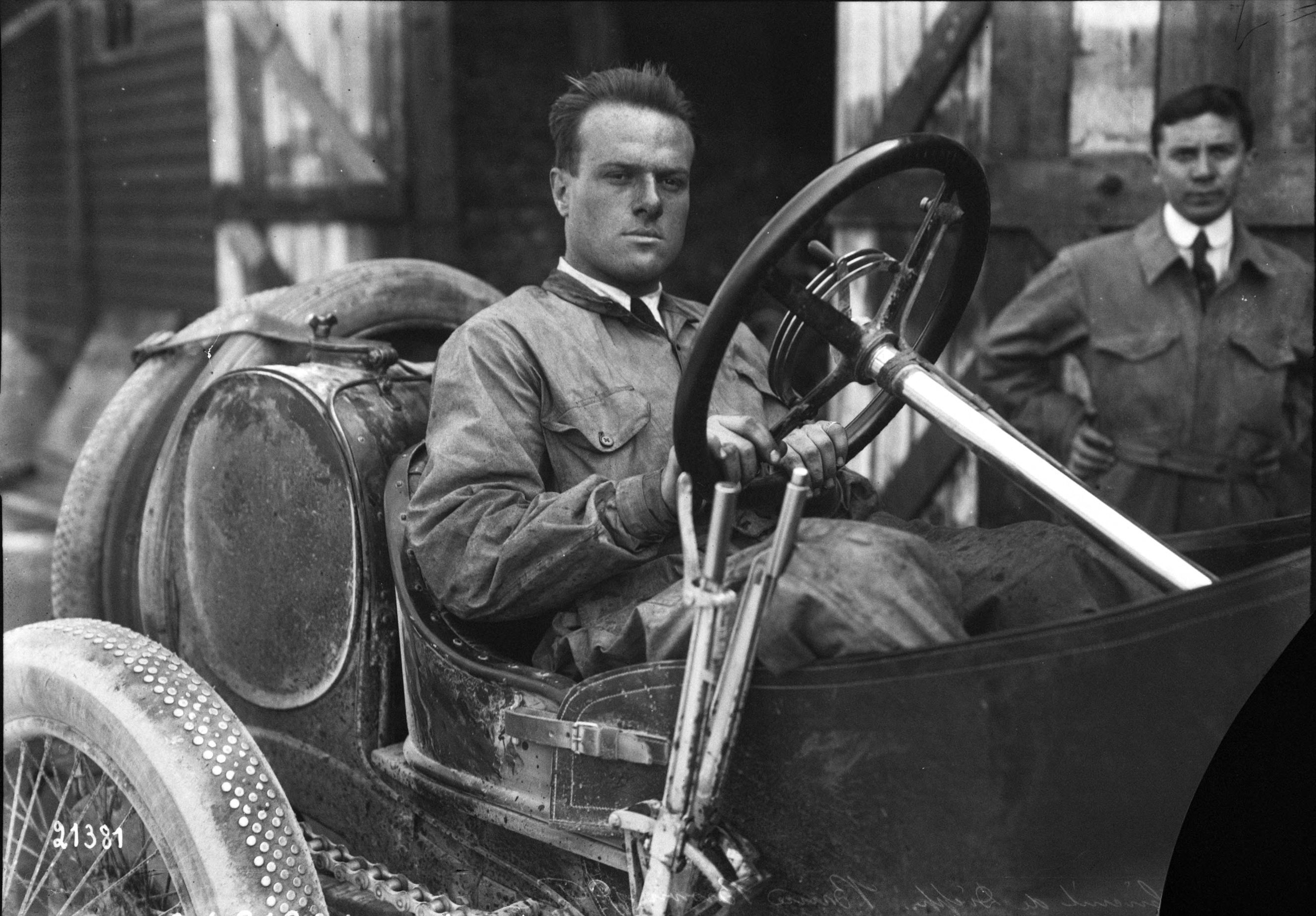
David Bruce-Brown in his Fiat

Tragedy marred the Grand Prize though, held three days later. David Bruce-Brown, America’s most promising young driver of the time, and his mechanic Tony Scudelari were both killed at the end of practice for the race. A tyre blew on their FIAT S74 at speed and the big car rolled and crushed the crew. Of the thirteen remaining cars all were driven by Americans although half the field were European cars. The drivers in the Vanderbilt returned and were joined by Caleb Bragg in a FIAT and three Benzes for Bob Burman, Erwin Bergdoll and Joe Horan.

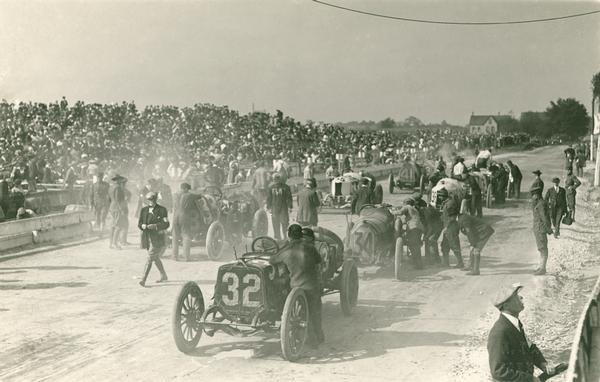
The grid for the American Grand Prize

From the start it was Tetzlaff, Bragg and DePalma racing at the front. By halfway, Telzlaff had a 12-minute lead but his hard driving broke the FIAT’s suspension. This left the other two contesting the win, but as DePalma tried an overtake the two cars touched and the Mercedes rolled into a field. DePalma broke his leg, while his mechanic was only lightly injured. Bragg went on to win for FIAT, with Bergdoll’s Benz second and Anderson was third. This result for his Stutz was the best result to that time for an American race-car.

Although successful, these road-races were expensive to hold. With more purpose-built racing ovals being built, there were no offers to host them the next year marking a gradual decline in American racing just as Europe was coming out of its racing doldrums. With four wins, Ralph DePalma in his Mercedes was announced as the AAA national champion for the year. But it was the rise of innovative engineers like the Duesenberg brothers, Harry Miller and those at Mercer that marked the future for American motorsport. The new Peugeot had returned France to the forefront of motor-racing, while the performance of Sunbeam had highlighted British engineering.

Citations
