= 1911 American Grand Prize =

Race details
- Date: November 30, 1911
- Official name: III American Grand Prize
- Location: Savannah, U.S.
- Course: Public roads (Savannah-Effingham Raceway)
- Course length: 27.52 km (17.1 miles)
- Distance: 24 laps, 660.48 km (410.4 miles)

Podium
| First | (United States) David Bruce-Brown | Fiat |
| Second | (United States) Eddie Hearne | Benz |
| Third | (United States) Ralph DePalma | Mercedes |

The 1911 American Grand Prize was held on November 30, 1911, on the Savannah-Effingham Raceway, a road course in Savannah, Georgia, 27.52km (17.1 miles) long, and was the final race of the 1911 Grand Prix season, three days after the Vanderbilt Cup was held on the same track. It was sanctioned by the Automobile Club of America and represented one of the last major American road races before the Grand Prize moved to other venues in subsequent years. David Bruce-Brown won by just over two minutes over Eddie Hearne. Bruce-Brown's average speed was 74.458 mph (121.478 km/h).

== Historical background ==
Savannah had become a major center for American road racing by 1911. The city previously hosted Grand Prize races in 1908 and 1910, earning a reputation for its scenic yet technically demanding course. The track combined city streets and rural roads, lined with oak trees draped in Spanish moss, and featured advanced road‑building techniques for the era, including Macadam surfacing on much of the route. These races were organized by the ACA and were considered direct rivals to the Vanderbilt Cup and other early American road races. By 1911, the Grand Prize and Vanderbilt Cup were intentionally scheduled within the same week, using the same Savannah course. This pairing marked the final time the Grand Prize would be held in Savannah before the event moved to Milwaukee, Santa Monica, and San Francisco in later years.

== Classification ==
| Pos | No | Driver | Car | Laps | Time/Retired |
|---|---|---|---|---|---|
| 1 | 48 | (United States) David Bruce-Brown | Fiat | 24 | 5:31:29.13 |
| 2 | 47 | (United States) Eddie Hearne | Benz | 24 | 5:33:33.07 |
| 3 | 55 | (United States) Ralph DePalma | Mercedes | 24 | 5:34:40.80 |
| 4 | 53 | (United States) Caleb Bragg | Fiat | 24 | 5:51:55.29 |
| 5 | 42 | (United States) Louis Disbrow | Pope-Hartford | 24 | 6:26:44.60 |
| 6 | 44 | (United States) Leland Mitchell | Abbott-Detroit | 23 | +1 Lap |
| 7 | 45 | (United States) Ralph Mulford | Lozier | 22 | Broken rear axle |
| 8 | 50 | (United States) Carl Limberg | Abbott-Detroit | 21 | +3 Laps |
| 9 | 41 | (France) Louis Wagner | Fiat | 14 | Broken steering |
| 10 | 43 | (United States) Charles Basle | Buick | 9 | Engine |
| 11 | 51 | (United States) Cyrus Patschke | Marmon | 8 | Out |
| 12 | 54 | (United States) Spencer Wishart | Mercedes | 8 | Cracked cylinder |
| 13 | 52 | (United States) Erwin Bergdoll | Benz | 7 | Broken gear |
| 14 | 56 | (France) Victor Hémery | Benz | 7 | Broken valve |
| 15 | 46 | (United States) Bob Burman | Marmon | 4 | Magneto shaft |
| 16 | 49 | (United States) Harry Cobe | Buick | 2 | Crash |

Grand Prix Race
1911 Grand Prix season
| Previous race: 1910 American Grand Prize | United States Grand Prix | Next race: 1912 American Grand Prize |
