= 1912 American Grand Prize =

1912 American Grand Prix

Race details
- Date: October 5, 1912
- Official name: IV American Grand Prix
- Location: Milwaukee, Wisconsin, United States
- Course: Public roads
- Course length: 12.68 km (7.88 miles)
- Distance: 52 laps, 659.36 km (409.76 miles)

Podium
First	(United States) Caleb Bragg	Fiat
Second	(United States) Erwin Bergdoll	Benz
Third	(United States) Gil Andersen	Stutz

The 1912 American Grand Prix was the seventh and final race of the 1912 Grand Prix season. It was held at the Wauwatosa Road Race Course in Milwaukee, Wisconsin and was sanctioned by the Automobile Club of America. Caleb Bragg won by over 15 minutes over Erwin Bergdoll. Bragg's average speed was 68.397 mph (110.074 km/h).

The event was marred by the deaths of two-time and defending winner David Bruce-Brown and his mechanician Tony Scudellari in a practice accident. Bruce-Brown's car was repaired by Barney Oldfield and driven to a fourth-place finish. Ralph DePalma and his mechanician Tom Alley were injured when DePalma's Mercedes touched the rear of Bragg's Fiat and overturned, ejecting its occupants.

== Classification ==
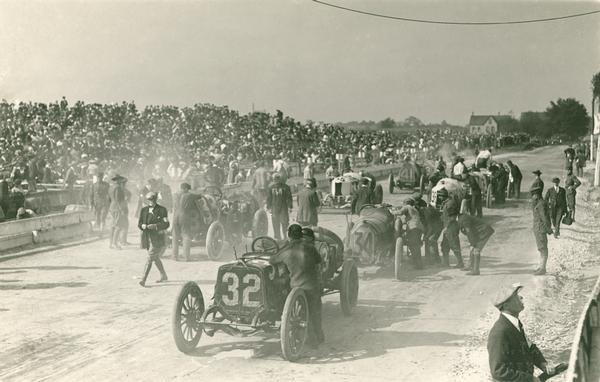
The grid before the race

Pos	No	Driver	Car	Laps	Time/Retired
1	41	(United States) Caleb Bragg	Fiat	52	5:59:27.44
2	40	(United States) Erwin Bergdoll	Benz	52	6:14:58.38
3	43	(United States) Gil Andersen	Stutz-Wisconsin	52	6:15:22.47
4	44	(United States) Barney Oldfield	Fiat	52	6:19:54.69
5	39	(United States) George Clark	Mercedes	50	+2 Laps
6	42	(United States) Joe Horan	Benz	47	+5 Laps
7	35	(United States) Ralph DePalma	Mercedes	51	Crashed
8	33	(United States) Teddy Tetzlaff	Fiat	30	Broken Radius Rod
9	32	(United States) Louis Fountaine	Lozier	21	Steering knuckle
10	34	(United Kingdom) Hughie Hughes	Mercer	16	Broken fuel line
11	36	(United States) Spencer Wishart	Mercedes	3	Drive shaft
12	31	(United States) Bob Burman	Benz	2	Broken piston
DNS	47	(United States) Ralph Mulford	Knox	0	Ignition

Grand Prix Race
1912 Grand Prix season
Previous race: 1911 American Grand Prize	United States Grand Prix	Next race: 1914 American Grand Prize
