= 1913 Grand Prix season =

Grand Prix season

Seasons
- ← 1912 1914 →

The 1913 Grand Prix season consisted of Grand Prix races in Europe and the United States. Once again, the Peugeot works cars were the team to beat, continuing their success. This year the French Grand Prix was held in Amiens. The ACF introduced a fuel-economy formula for the race to discourage bigger-engined cars. Peugeot drivers Georges Boillot and Jules Goux claimed a 1-2 victory for the company after Zuccarelli had been killed in practice.

In the United States, the growing expense of hosting the Vanderbilt Cup and American Grand Prize meant they were not held this year. So it was that the Indianapolis 500 became the premier American event this year. The Europeans crossed the Atlantic for the race and Goux had a comfortable 13-minute margin of victory for Peugeot ahead of Spencer Wishart’s new Mercer.

Peugeot did not contest the Coupe de la Sarthe at Le Mans where Paul Bablot and Albert Guyot, in the new Delage Type Y, had a 1-2 victory themselves. However, with the new 3-litre EX-5 variant, Peugeot won the last major race of the year with Boillot and Goux finishing 1-2 at the Coupe des Voiturettes.

By winning five of the fourteen races in the series, Earl Cooper in the new Stutz, was acclaimed as the AAA national champion for the year.

== Major races ==
Date	Name	Circuit	Race Regulations	Race Distance	Winner’s Time	Winning driver	Winning constructor	Report
11/12 May	(Italy) VIII Targa Florio (Giro di Sicilia)	Sicily	Targa Florio	980 km	19h 19m	(Italy) Felice Nazzaro	Nazzaro Tipo 2	Report
30 May	(United States) III Indianapolis 500	Indianapolis	AAA	500 miles	6h 35m	(France) Jules Goux	Peugeot L-76	Report
26 May	(Russia) I Russian Grand Prix	St Petersburg			2h 24m	(Russia) Georgy Suvorin	Benz 29/60 hp	Report
15 Jun	(Spain) RACE Grand Prix	Guadarrama	Tourer cars	303 km	3h 34m	(Spain) Carlos de Salamanca	Rolls-Royce	Report
15 Jun	(France) I Circuit de Provence	Trets		300 km		(France) Georges Boillot	Peugeot EX-3	Report
12 Jul	(France) XIII French Grand Prix	Amiens	ACF	920 km	7h 54m	(France) Georges Boillot	Peugeot EX-3	Report
5 Aug	III Grand Prix de France	Le Mans	Formula Libre	540 km	4h 22m	(France) Paul Bablot	Delage Type Y	Report
5 Aug	(France) II Coupe de la Sarthe	Le Mans	Voiturette	540 km	5h 48m	(Italy) Jean Porporato	Grégoire	Report
13 Aug	(Belgium) II Grand Prix du RACB	Spa	Formula Libre			. Derney	Springuel	Report
21 Sep	(France) VIII Coupe des Voiturettes (Coupe de l’Auto)	Boulogne	Voiturette	625 km	6h 05m	(France) Georges Boillot	Peugeot EX-5	Report

== Technical ==
The innovative Peugeot L-76 had appeared the previous year. Powered by a four-cylinder 7.6L engine with a twin-overhead camshaft, with four valves per cylinder developing 148 bhp. In March Jules Goux took one to Brooklands where he raised the record for the flying half-mile to 109.99 mph (177.01 km/h).

The Peugeot engine was the first to use Dry-sump lubrication that would become standard as racing cars needed engines lowered to drop their centre of gravity. With the variety of racing regulations, Peugeot set about developing modified versions of the 7.6-litre engine. Cylinder inserts made it a 7.3-litre engine, while a 5.7-litre was made for the Grand Prix EX-3 model and a 3.0-litre voiturette version for the new EX-5. The team also introduced wheels secured by winged wheel-nuts that allowed them to be hammered off far quicker in pit-stops than the old-style “artillery-wheels” of other teams.

== Season review ==
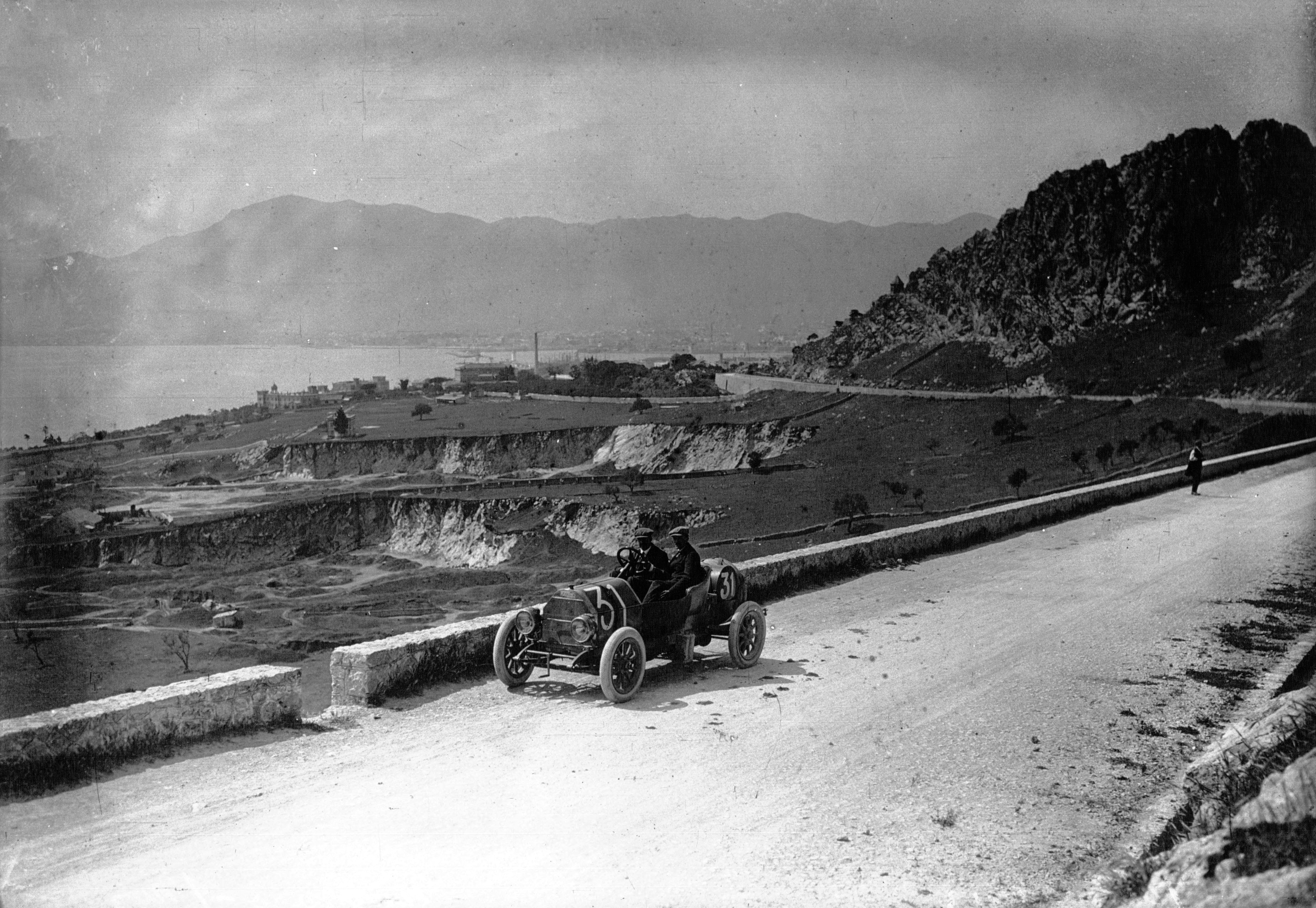
Nazzaro racing in the Targa Florio

For the second year the Targa Florio was not held on the Madonie circuit, but as the Giro di Sicilia – going clockwise on the coastal roads around Sicily. This year, the cars would stop at Agrigento and be locked up overnight before resuming the race back to Palermo. A big field of 33 cars was at the Palazzo Villarosa for the start. At the end of the first day, it was Giovanni “Gigi” Marsaglia in an Aquila Italiana, who held a half-hour lead over Felice Nazzaro, the long-time works driver for FIAT, now driving a car of his own making. In a curious incident, a driver following another car’s dust saw a child on the road. When he then hit a curbstone he was convinced he had hit the child. He stopped and fled the scene, catching a ferry from Messina to the mainland. Only sixteen cars started the second day. Marsaglia held his lead until near the end when engine issues stopped him. Nazzaro came through for the victory an hour ahead of the unlucky Marsaglia.

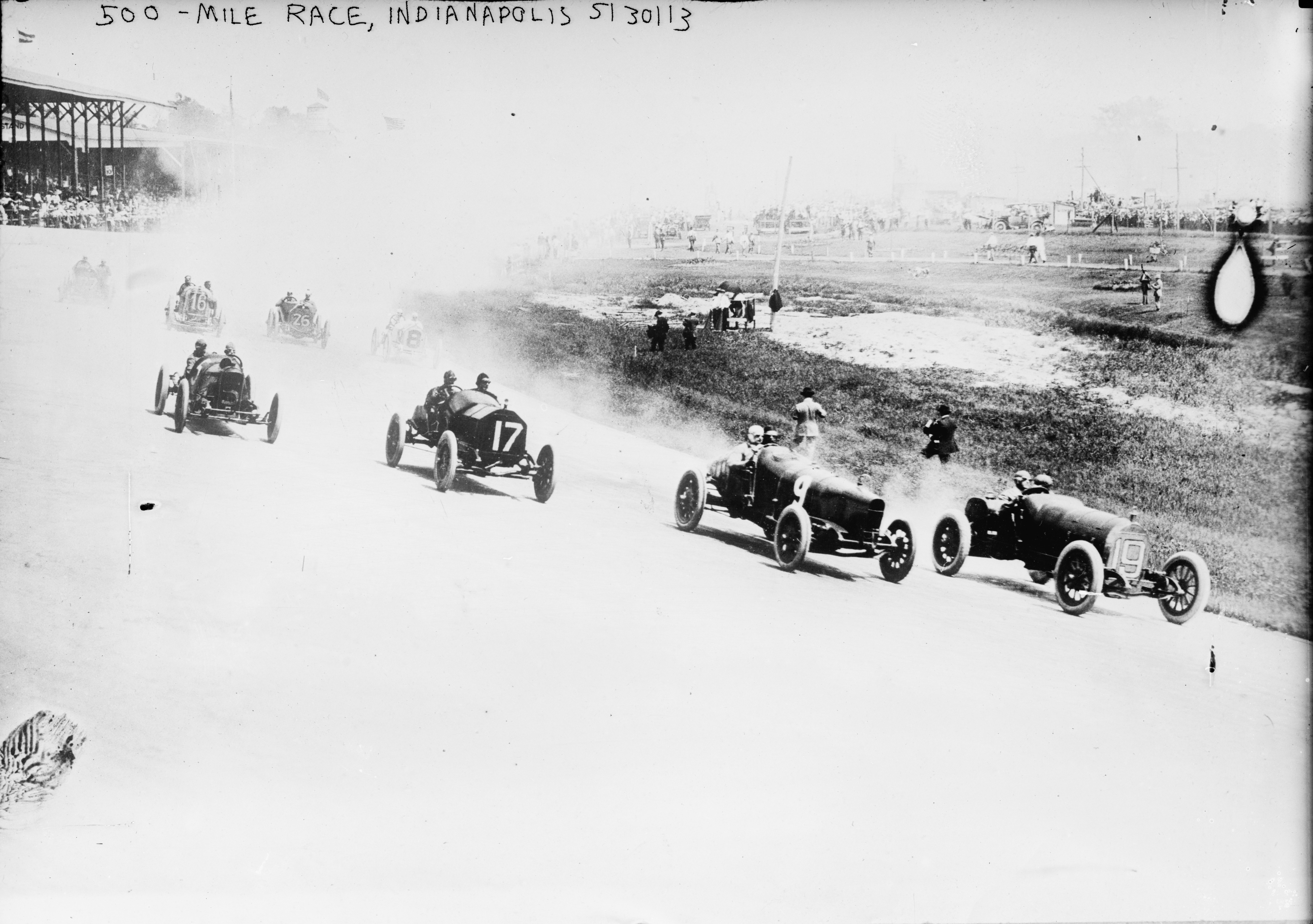
Bragg leading the rolling start of the Indy 500

With the Vanderbilt Cup and American Grand Prize not being held this year, it meant the Indianapolis 500 became the premier event in the United States. This year the maximum engine permitted was reduced from 600 to 450 cubic inches (7.4-litres). Carl Fisher, on the organising committee, sent an invitation to Peugeot to attend, and they accepted sending two cars (with engines modified down to 7.3 litres) with Goux and Paolo Zuccarelli. Other Europeans were drawn to the big money on offer: Isotta-Fraschini had three cars for Italian Vincenzo Trucco and Americans Teddy Tetzlaff and Harry Grant. Théodore Pilette, Belgian agent for Mercedes, ran a Mercedes as did Ralph Mulford. Albert Guyot raced a 4.5-litre Sunbeam.

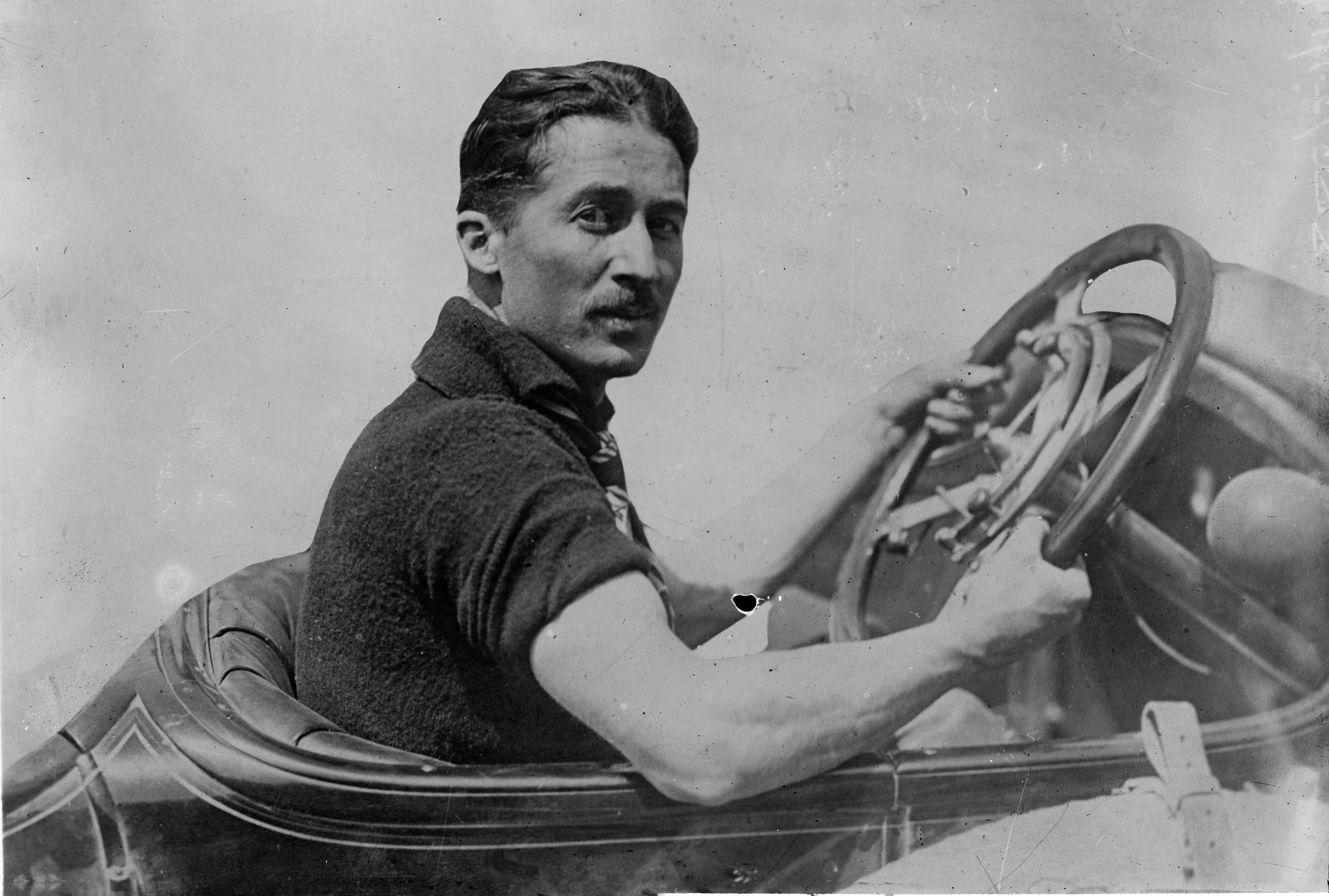
Jules Goux

More and more American drivers were moving to the specialised racing cars: Ralph DePalma and Spencer Wishart had moved from Mercedes to Mercer with Caleb Bragg. Stutz ran cars for Gil Andersen and Charlie Merz while Jack Tower had one of the three Masons from the Duesenberg brothers.

During practice the Peugeots had problems adapting to the brick surface, burning through their tyres. Fisher suggested they work with local racer Johnny Aitken. Tower posted the fastest lap in practice, but in the random draw for grid positions started from the back row while Caleb Bragg drew the pole position. From the start rookie Robert Evans got his Mason into the lead. On the 51st lap Towers crashed, rolling his car. Towers suffered a broken leg and his mechanic broken ribs. DePalma and Zuccarelli both retired early with engine trouble. Goux won comfortably for Peugeot, with a 13-minute margin over Wishart’s Mercer and Merz third with in his Stutz. He was supposed to have consumed champagne during his pit-stops and arrived home in Paris to great fanfare.

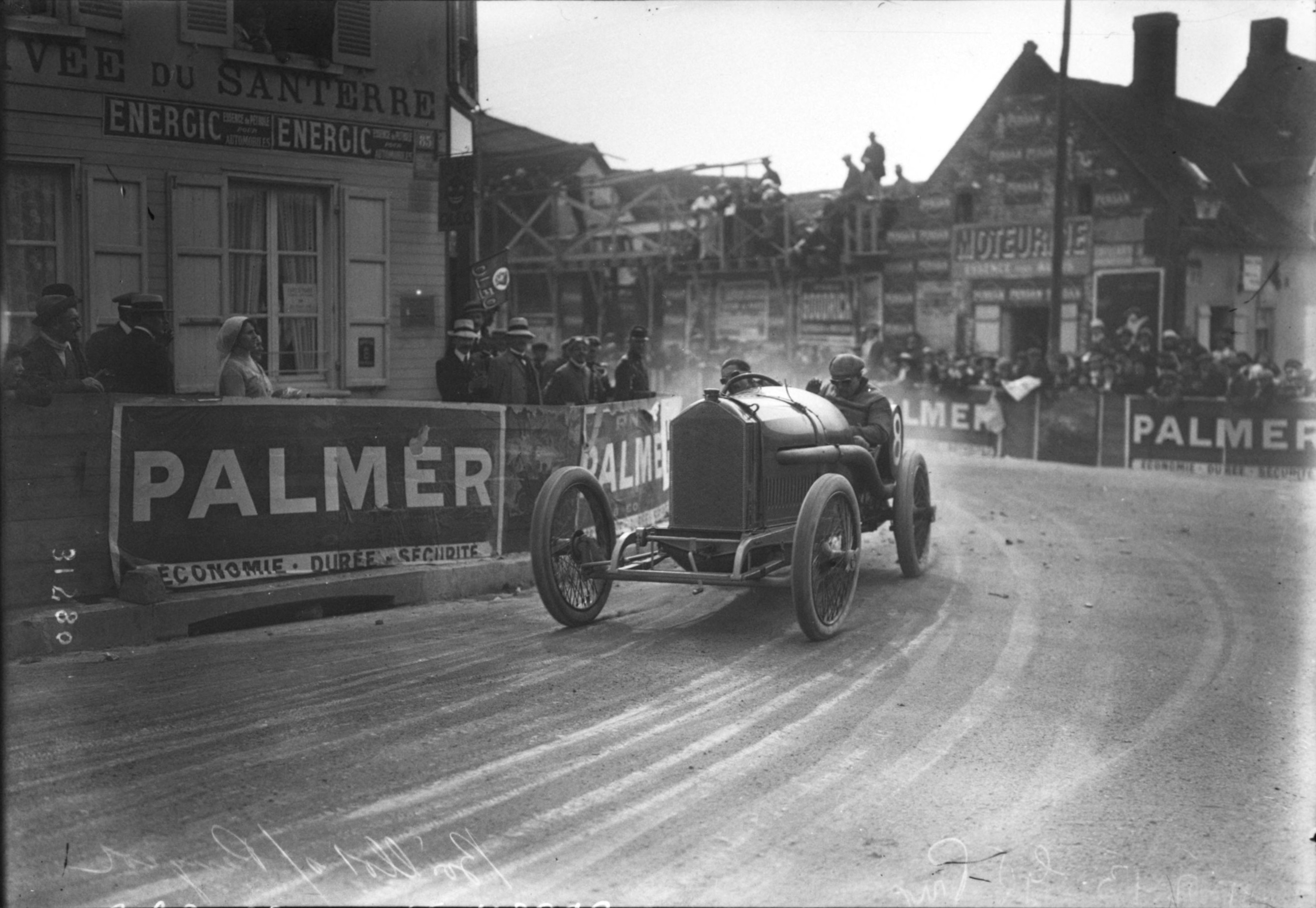
Boillot in his Peugeot EX3. French GP

The Grand Prix was held in July at a new venue: a 31 km circuit based at Amiens in Picardie where it was hoped the shorter circuit would attract more spectators in the industrial north-east. This year the French Automobile Club (ACF) organisers stipulated a fuel-economy formula. Cars would be issued sufficient fuel the 917 km race (29 laps) at an average of 20 litres per 100 kilometres (14 mpg_{‑imp}; 12 mpg_{‑US}). They also had to weigh between 800 and 1100 kg. With a maximum of three cars per team, the entry list was still strong enough that the ACF did not need to include a voiturette category this year. Peugeot arrived with the new model EX-3 with a 5.6-litre engine (115 bhp), to be driven by its three regular works drivers: Boillot, Goux and Zuccarelli. French entries also came from Th. Schneider and Mathis. Delage came with their fast, new Type Y (110 bhp) to be driven by Albert Guyot and Paul Bablot.

Foreign entries came from Itala (Italy), Opel (4.0L, 88 bhp) (Germany), Excelsior (6.1L, 120 bhp) (Belgium) and Sunbeam (4.5L, 95 bhp) (Great Britain). Once again Théodore Pilette was rebuffed when he tried to enter a Mercedes team. The ACF demanded entries from manufacturers alone, not agents or privateers.

Racing on public roads was dangerous. Itala engineer Guido Bigio and his mechanic had been killed in May while testing. Then during a Peugeot test to the west of Paris Zuccarelli had a terrible accident while travelling at 160 km/h on a long straight to Evreux. When a farm cart pulled out into the road his car had no chance to avoid it and hit it head-on and rolled. Zuccarelli was killed immediately; his mechanic and the farmer were severely injured. Boillot travelling close behind just managed to avoid the carnage.

The race itself was also full of incident. On the first lap, Moriondo rolled his Itala, but he and his mechanic, unhurt, were able to jump out and straighten the steering and change a wheel to resume the race. At the end of the first lap Boillot was leading from Goux then Jean Chassagne in the Sunbeam. Then when Boillot was delayed in the pits with ignition problems it was Guyot’s Delage that took the lead. Boillot drove hard and retook the lead only to be sidelined by a burst radiator hose. On the ninth lap Guyot had a tyre blow out. In his eagerness, his mechanic jumped out but was run over by the Delage. Guyot slowly toured back to the pits to get him medical attention before rejoining the race.

In the latter part of the race, the Sunbeam of Kenelm Lee Guinness crashed into a stream, killing a spectator. After nearly eight hours, it was Boillot who won consecutive Grand Prix, becoming a national hero. Three minutes back was Goux for a superb Peugeot 1-2, with Chassagne ten minutes behind in third. Bablot was fourth in the Delage with his unfortunate teammate Guyot a minute back in fifth. Boillot’s Peugeot accomplished a comfortable fuel economy of 17 litres/100 km and Goux did 18.

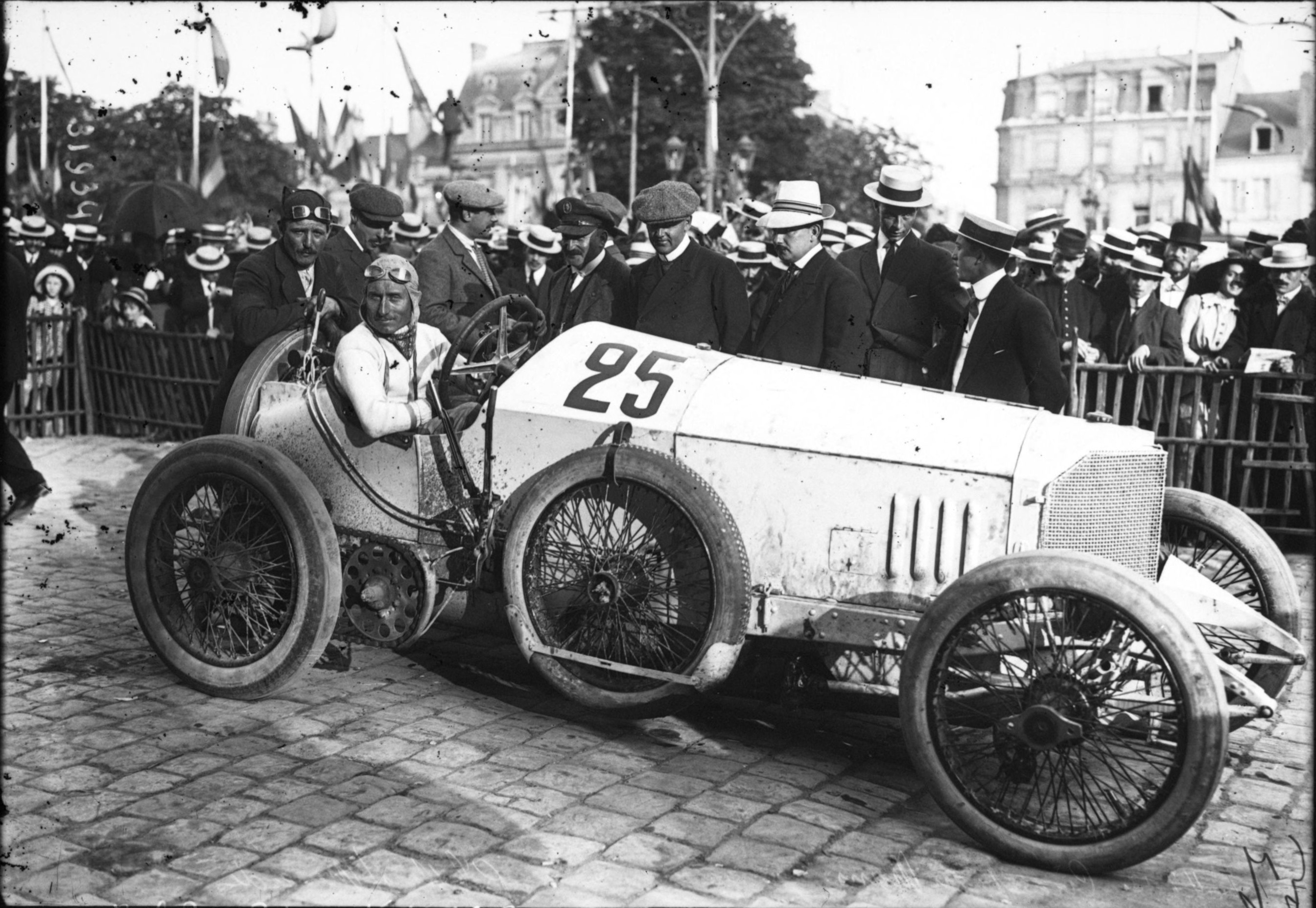
Théodore Pilette, Mercedes

In August, the AC de la Sarthe et de l’Ouest(forerunner of the Automobile Club de l'Ouest) ran its event. On the Saturday was the inaugural Cyclecar grand prix for the newly formed Union Motocycliste de France (UMF). The next day was the Coupe de le Sarthe, run concurrently with voiturettes. Pilette entered four Mercedes cars for himself and the three works drivers. Peugeot was not present so it became a contest between the German cars and the French Delage and Th.Schneider teams. Honours went to Delage with a 1-2 victory for Bablot and Guyot, ahead of Pilette and veteran Otto Salzer in their Mercedes – the last chain-drive cars in A Grand Prix-level event. The voiturette class was won by Jean Porporato in a Grégoire.

Peugeot returned with their 3-litre EX-5 derivatives for the Coupe des Voiturettes held at Boulogne. Only Guyot was present for Delage, while three cars were entered for Sunbeam. When Dario Resta and Chassagne both retired with rear-axle failures on their Sunbeams in the first half of the race, it proved to be an easy victory for Boillot. He had nearly a ten-minute margin over teammate Goux with Lee Guinness close behind in third.

This year’s AAA national championship was run over fourteen races at nine tracks. Earl Cooper, driving the new Stutz, won five of the races at four of the rounds and was second at another to be proclaimed the unofficial National Champion for the year.

Citations
