= 1910 American Grand Prize =

Race details
- Date: November 12, 1910
- Official name: II American Grand Prize
- Location: Savannah, U.S.
- Course: Public roads
- Course length: 27.8 km (17.3 miles)
- Distance: 24 laps, 668.1 km (415.2 miles)

Fastest lap
Driver	(Italy) Felice Nazzaro	Fiat
- Time: 13:42.0 on lap 7

Podium
First	(United States) David Bruce-Brown	Benz
Second	(France) Victor Hémery	Benz
Third	(United States) Bob Burman	Marquette-Buick

The 1910 American Grand Prize was a Grand Prix auto race held on closed public roads outside Savannah, Georgia, United States, on November 12, 1910. It was the second edition of the Automobile Club of America's American Grand Prize. The race was won by American David Bruce-Brown in a Benz.

== Summary ==
After a successful race in 1908, the Automobile Club of America made plans with the rival American Automobile Association to hold the Grand Prize and Vanderbilt Cup together on the Long Island Motor Parkway in 1909. However, only the Vanderbilt race was held, and the Grand Prize pushed back to 1910. After the 1910 Vanderbilt Cup saw the deaths of 2 riding mechanics and several serious spectator injuries, the Grand Prize was cancelled once again. A last-minute request by the Savannah Automobile Club saved the race for the year, but only gave one month to prepare the course. A shorter 17-mile (27 km) course was laid out, but due to the short notice, many European teams were not able to make the trip; only 6 European cars entered the event, down from 14 two years ago.

The race began at 9 AM, with cars leaving the start line at 30-second intervals. Victor Hémery, driving a Benz, led early. Arthur Chevrolet was second after lap 1, but would eventually be overtaken by the factory Benzes and Fiats before falling out of the race on lap 9. Felice Nazzaro took over second place and pushed hard to catch Hémery. After setting the lap record on lap 7, Nazzaro slid off the road into a ditch, bending his rear axle; he would retire a few laps later. Wagner assumed the lead, but he too would leave the road and strike a tree on lap 17. He resumed, but front axle damage later sent him into a cartwheel at speed, ending his race.

Ralph DePalma, Bruce-Brown, and Hémery took over the first three positions, within two minutes of each other. On the penultimate lap, De Palma cracked a cylinder in the last of the Fiats. At the finish, Hémery crossed the line first due to the staggered start, and as in 1908 was forced to wait for the next car to cross the line. In the end, Bruce-Brown finished just 1.42 seconds faster than Hémery.

== Classification ==
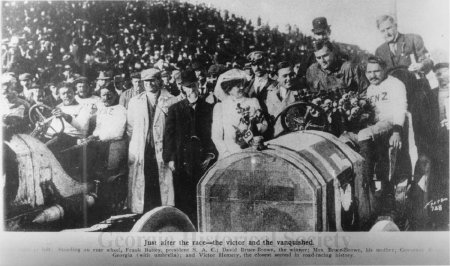
David Bruce-Brown atop his Benz

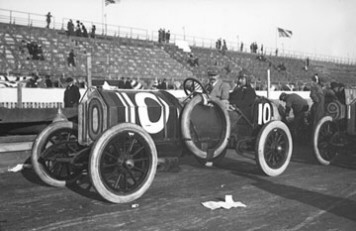
Felice Nazzaro's Fiat

Pos	No	Driver	Car	Laps	Time/Retired
1	15	(United States) David Bruce-Brown	Benz	24	5:53:05.35
2	9	(France) Victor Hémery	Benz	24	+ 1.42
3	17	(United States) Bob Burman	Marquette-Buick	24	+ 18:18.14
4	4	(United States) Ralph Mulford	Lozier	24	+ 33:07.33
5	12	(United States) Joe Horan	Lozier 6	24	+ 36:57.37
6	14	(United States) Ray Harroun (United States) Joe Dawson	Marmon	24	+ 37:16.87
Ret	19	(United States) Ralph DePalma	Fiat	23	Cylinder
Ret	10	(Italy) Felice Nazzaro	Fiat	19	Rear axle
Ret	6	(United States) Charles Basle	Pope Hartford	19	Piston
Ret	16	(France) Louis Wagner	Fiat	17	Crash
Ret	18	(United States) Willie Haupt	Benz	13	Crash
Ret	7	(United States) Harry Grant	Alco 6	11	Gears
Ret	3	(United States) Arthur Chevrolet	Marquette-Buick	9	Crankshaft
Ret	13	(United States) Louis Disbrow	Pope Hartford	9	Cylinder
Ret	8	(United States) Joe Dawson	Marmon	5	Crankshaft
DNS	1	(France) Étienne Planche	Roebling-Planche		
DNS	2	(United States) Harry Grant	Alco		
DNS	5	(United States) G. Armstrong	Mercedes		
DNS		(United States) W. H. Sharpe	Sharpe-Arrow		Fatal crash in practice
DNS		(United States) Joe Matson	Simplex		Engine in practice

Grand Prix Race
1910 Grand Prix season
Previous race: 1908 American Grand Prize	United States Grand Prix	Next race: 1911 American Grand Prize
