= 1908 American Grand Prize =

Race details
- Date: November 26, 1908
- Official name: Grand Prize of the Automobile Club of America
- Location: Savannah, U.S.
- Course: Public roads
- Course length: 40.434 km (25.130 miles)
- Distance: 16 laps, 646.946 km (402.080 miles)

Fastest lap
Driver	(United States) Ralph DePalma	Fiat
- Time: 21:36.0

Podium
First	(France) Louis Wagner	Fiat
Second	(France) Victor Hémery	Benz
Third	(Italy) Felice Nazzaro	Fiat

The 1908 Grand Prize of the Automobile Club of America took place at Savannah, Georgia, United States, on November 26, 1908.

== The race ==
Louis Wagner won the closely contested race in his Fiat finishing less than a minute ahead of Victor Hémery's Benz. Wagner's average speed for the race was 65.111 mph (104.786 km/h). Ralph DePalma set fastest lap in his Fiat, with an average speed of 69.80 mph (112.33 km/h).

== Classification ==
Pos	No	Driver	Car	Laps	Time/Retired
1	14	(France) Louis Wagner	Fiat	16	6:10:31.4
2	8	(France) Victor Hémery	Benz 150 hp		+ 56.4
3	6	(Italy) Felice Nazzaro	Fiat		+ 8:16.2
4	15	(France) René Hanriot	Benz 150 hp		+ 15:41.0
5	13	(Belgium) Lucien Hautvast	Clément-Bayard		+ 23:34.6
6	16	(United States) Lewis Strang	Renault		+ 33:05.6
7	1	(France) Victor Rigal	Clément-Bayard		+ 35:12.2
8	17	(France) Henri Fournier	Itala		+ 36:01.0
9	18	(United States) Ralph DePalma	Fiat		+ 41:03.4
10	9	(Belgium) Arthur Duray	De Dietrich	15	Flagged
11	3	(United States) Joe Seymour	Simplex	15	Flagged
Ret	11	(United States) Hugh Harding	National	12	Camshaft
Ret	19	(Germany) Fritz Erle	Benz	11	Crash
Ret	12	(Italy) Alessandro Cagno	Itala	11	Spring
Ret	2	(United States) Ralph Mulford	Lozier	11	Flagged
Ret	10	Ferenc Szisz	Renault	7	Wheel bearing
Ret	7	(United States) Len Zengel	Acme	7	Spring
Ret	20	(Italy) Giovanni Piacenza	Itala	6	Crash
Ret	5	(United States) Willie Haupt	Chadwick	5	Bearing
Ret	4	(United States) Bob Burman	Buick	3	Mechanical

Grand Prix Race
1908 Grand Prix season
Previous race: None	United States Grand Prix	Next race: 1910 American Grand Prize
