= Victor Hémery =

French racing driver (1876–1950)

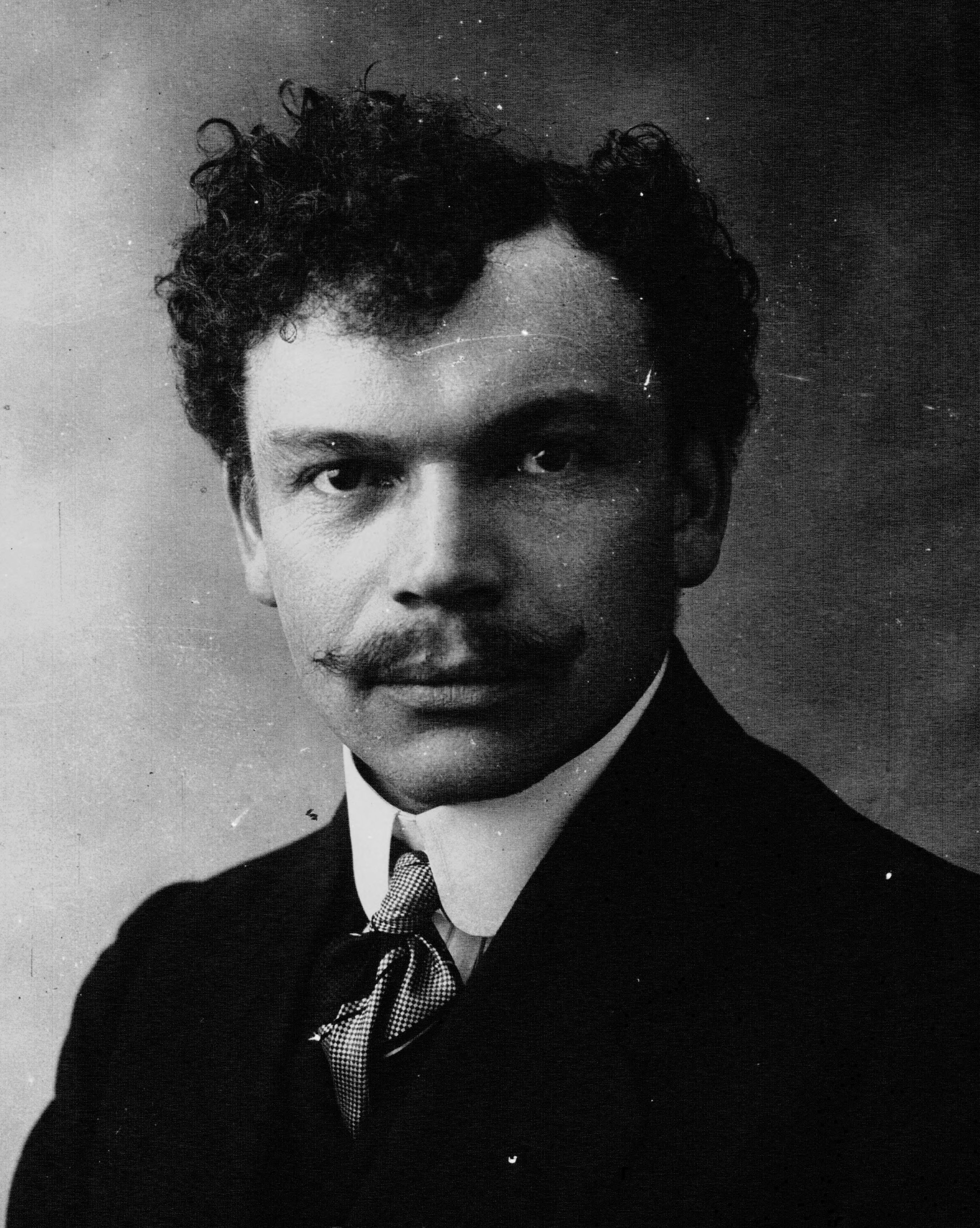
- Hémery in 1910
- Born: Victor Théodore Eugène Hémery; 18 November 1876 Sillé-le-Guillaume, Sarthe, France
- Died: 8 September 1950 (aged 73) Le Mans, Sarthe, France

Championship titles
- Major victories Vanderbilt Cup (1905)

Champ Car career
- 1 race run over 1 year
- First race: 1911 American Grand Prize (Savannah)
| Wins | Podiums | Poles |
|---|---|---|
| 0 | 0 | 0 |

Victor Théodore Eugène Hémery (18 November 1876 – 9 September 1950) was a French racing driver. He was the winner of the Vanderbilt Cup in 1905.

== Life and career ==
Hémery was born in Sillé-le-Guillaume, Sarthe, France. In 1904 he joined Automobiles Darracq France as their chief tester and helped prepare cars to compete in that year's Gordon Bennett Cup. He drove a German Opel-Darracq to victory at Hamburg-Bahrenfeld.

1905 was one of the most successful years of Hémery's career. In August 1905, he drove a Darracq to victory in Circuit des Ardennes at Bastogne, Belgium. That October, he won the Vanderbilt Cup at Long Island, New York, beating Felice Nazzaro, Louis Chevrolet, and Ferenc Szisz. On 30 December 1905 Hémery set a land speed record of 109.65 mph (176.46 km/h) in Arles, France, driving a Darracq.

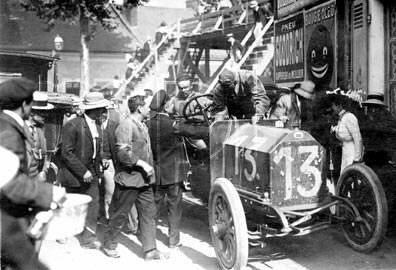
Hémery at the 1911 Grand Prix de France

Hémery left Darracq to join Benz & Cie. in 1907. In 1908, he won the St. Petersburg to Moscow race, and finished second in the French Grand Prix. He scored another second-place finish behind Louis Wagner at the 1908 American Grand Prize in Savannah, Georgia. On 8 November 1909, Hémery set another new speed record at Brooklands of 202.691 km/h (125.946 mph) driving the famous "Blitzen Benz" (German for "Lightning Benz"). In 1910, his Benz team finished 1–2 at the American Grand Prize, just 1.42 seconds behind winner David Bruce-Brown, the closest Grand Prize to date at the time. In 1911, Hémery won the Grand Prix de France at Circuit de la Sarthe in a FIAT S61.

Hémery died at Le Mans, France, on 9 September 1950, aged 73 years.
