= 1908 Circuito di Bologna =

The 1908 Circuito di Bologna was a Grand Prix car race. This race inspired Enzo Ferrari to become a racing driver. The race was won by Felice Nazzaro.

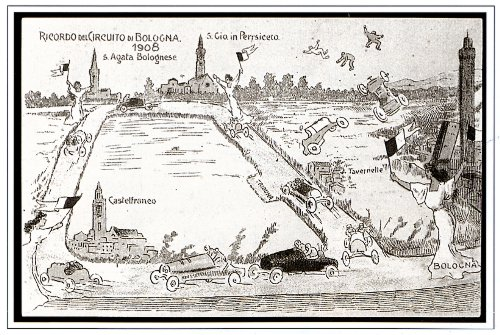
