= Victor William Kliesrath =

American motorboat racer (1880–1939)

- Born: May 27, 1880
- Died: December 21, 1939 (aged 59); Flower Hill, New York, US
- Occupations: Businessman; inventor; motorboat racer

Victor William Kliesrath (May 27, 1880 – December 21, 1939) was vice president of Bendix Corporation, motorboat racer, and the inventor of the Bragg-Kliesrath brake with Caleb Bragg. They sold the company to Bendix Corporation in the late 1920s.

== Life ==
Kliesrath was born on May 27, 1880, to Jacob Kliesrath and Ida Baumbach. In speedboat racing, Kliesrath won the APBA Challenge Cup race multiple times – first in Red Bank, New Jersey, in 1930 and then in Lake Montauk, New York, in 1931.

He died on December 21, 1939, at his home in Flower Hill, New York, after a long battle with an illness.
