= Abbott-Detroit =

American luxury automobile manufactured between 1909 and 1919

Abbott-Detroit Motor Car Company
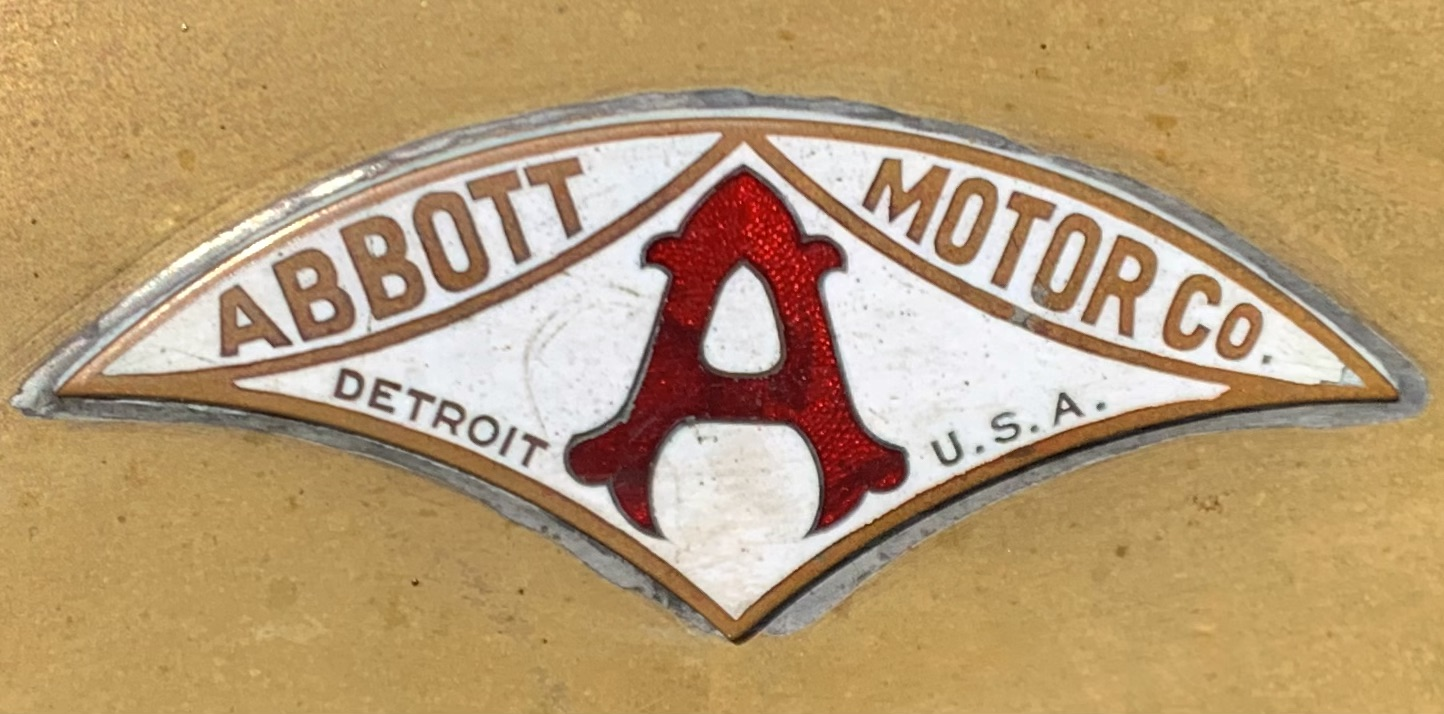
- Industry: Automotive
- Founded: 1909
- Defunct: 1919
- Fate: Bankrupt
- Headquarters: Detroit, Michigan (1909-1916); Cleveland, Ohio (1916-1919)
- Products: Automobiles

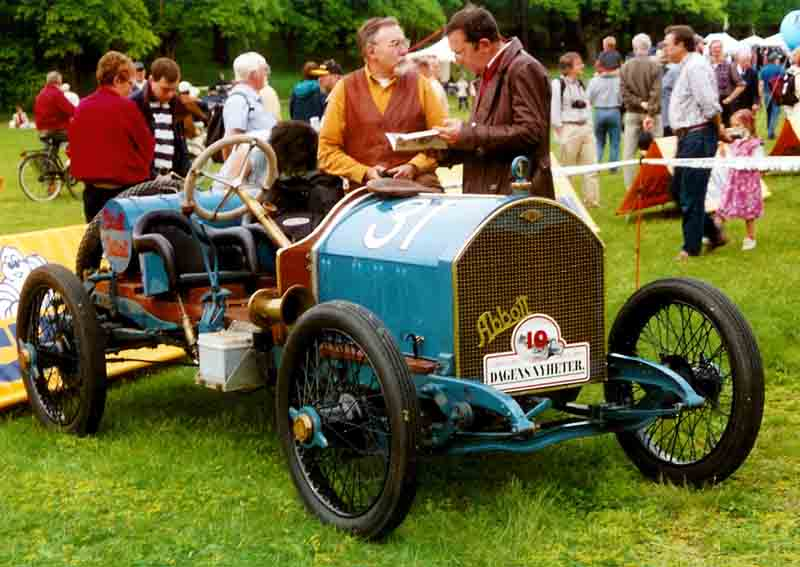
Abbott-Detroit 1911

The Abbott-Detroit was an American luxury automobile manufactured between 1909 and 1919. Established in 1909 by Charles S. Abbott, the company was based in Detroit, Michigan.

== History ==
Charles S. Abbott sought to produce high-quality, stylish automobilses, positioning Abbott-Detroit as a competitor in the early 20th-century luxury automobile market.

The original car was designed by John G. Utz, designer of the Chalmers, who had previously worked for Olds Motor Works and the Autocar Company. On presentation, the car received high praise:

One of the prettiest cars yet to appear in Kansas City arrived last week. It was the Abbott-Detroit, a four-cylinder, five-passenger car, equipped with magneto and full electric light plant. The tonneau of this car is large and roomy, having a brass foot rest and coat rail. The price is $1,500. The Abbott-Detroit has many new features. Its designer is John G. Utz, designer of the Chalmers and formerly with the Olds Motor Works and the Autocar. The new car is refined in mechanical detail and finish and rich in the selection of material and equipment. The dash shows refinment of detail, having nothing in sight but the oilfeed and electric light switches. The electric light plant is part of the regular equipment of the car. The car is credited with a speed of from [sic] five to fifty miles an hour. The local branch will place five hundred cars in Kansas, Missouri and Oklahoma, and will be known as the Abbott Motor Car Company. H. F. Worth, as sales manager, will have charge. A new building is being constructed, to be used as salesrooms, at the southeast corner of Admiral Boulevard and McGee Street. It will be finished the latter part of this month. Temporary quarters have been established in the Century Building at 812 Grand Avenue.

Considered powerful and well-designed, the Abbott sported a Continental engine. The cars were guaranteed for life by 1913, when electric lighting and starting had been standardized.

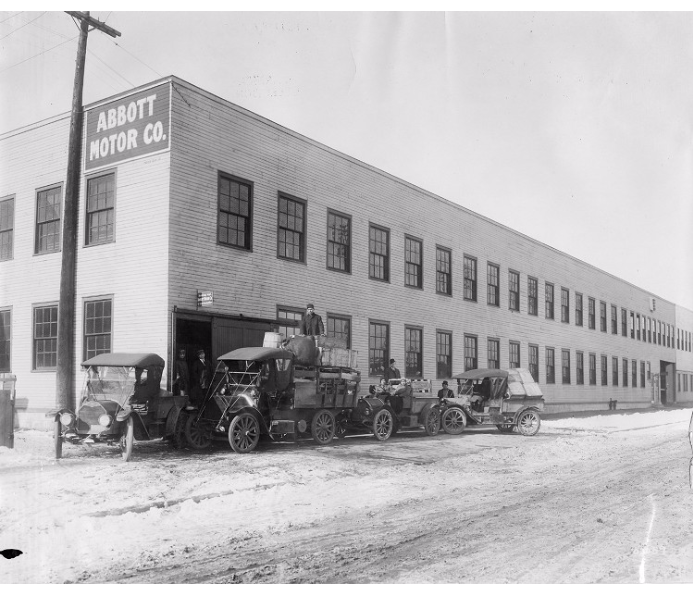
The Abbott Motor Company in 1912

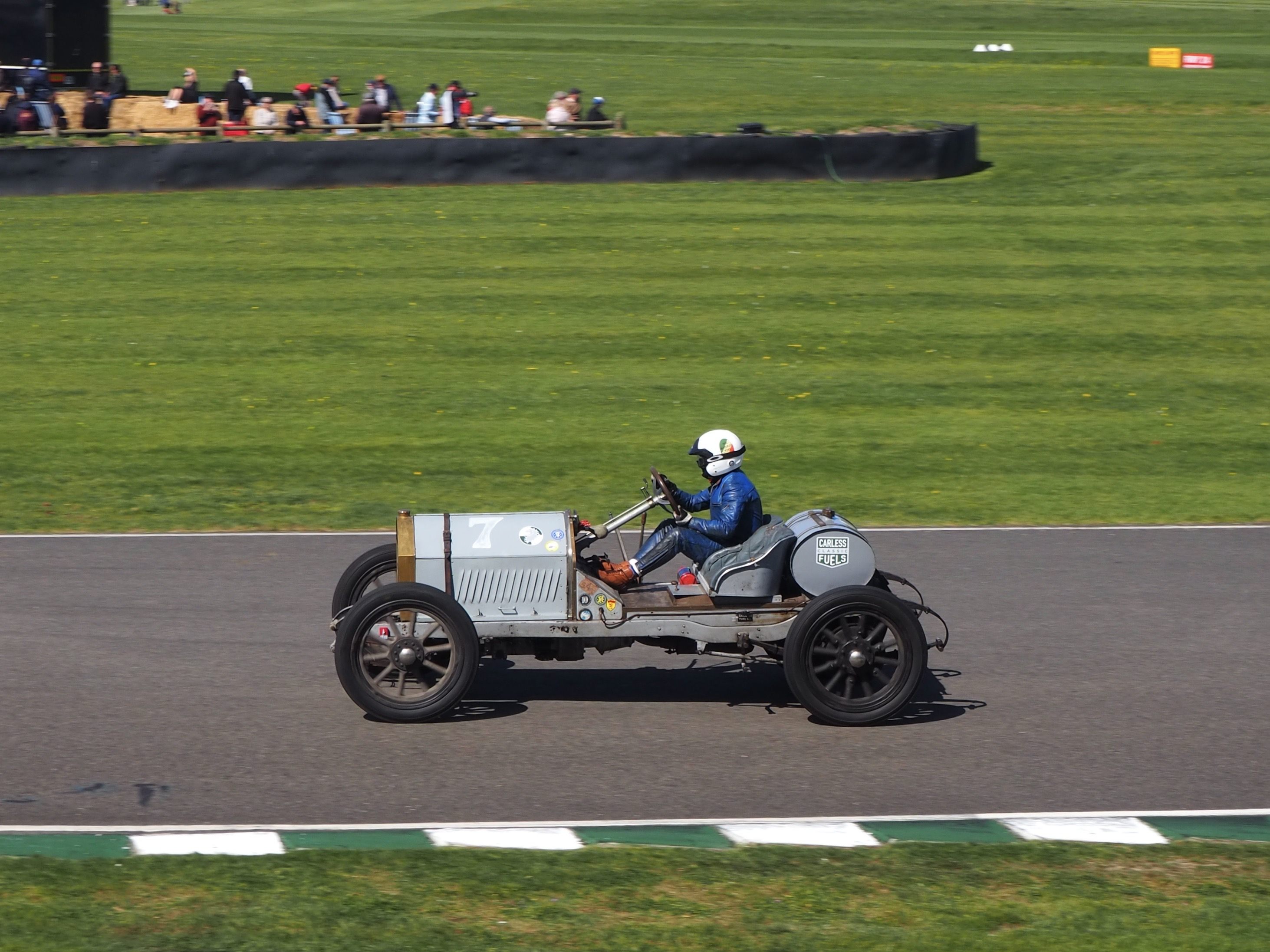
1912 Abbott Detroit with Gillian Carr driving, Goodwood Members' Meeting 2026

Total production for the 1911 model year was expected to be 3000 cars. By 1916, production of these cars had reached 15 to 20 units a day, so the company moved from Detroit to a larger facility in Cleveland. This proved too stressful on the company's finances, and they declared bankruptcy in April 1918.

== Dealerships ==
The company opened a dealership in Kansas City, Missouri, around June 1910. The newly constructed building was located at 321 Admiral Boulevard, on the southeast corner of Admiral Boulevard and McGee Street. H. F. Worth was the sales manager at the time. His goal was to "place five hundred cars in Kansas, Missouri and Oklahoma."

== Models ==
Models that Abbott-Detroit offered included:

- 34/45 hp (25/30 kW) Fore Door Roadster
- Limousine (1913 model)
- 44/40 hp (33/37 kW) Battleship Roadster
- 34 hp (25 kW) Model F
- 31 hp (24 kW) Model L
- 22 hp (20 kW) Model K
- 30 hp Fore Door Roadster ($1500 in 1910)
- 30 hp Fore Door Demi Tonneau ($1650 in 1910)

Prices ranged from US$1700 for the Fore Door to US$3050 for the Limousine.

== See also ==
- Brass Era car
- List of defunct automobile manufacturers
