= Automobiles Grégoire =

French Former automobile manufacturer

Automobiles Grégoire was a French manufacturer of cars and aero engines, established in 1902 in operation for about 20 years. The company grew from an earlier enterprise making engines under the name "Cyclone", established in 1899 by Louis Soncin, in Poissy, but was largely the creation of Pierre Joseph Grégoire (1876 - 1962).

== Cars ==
At the factory on the Boulevard Devaux in Poissy, Grégoire started off by manufacturing engines in 1903, but in 1904, the company started to manufacture automobiles. The design was easily recognisable by its pear-shaped radiator. The company made cars with single-, two- and four-cylinder engines. In 1911, a six-cylinder and a four-cylinder sleeve-valve engine were also produced. The Grégoire company never sold many automobiles. In 1913, only 500 cars were made.

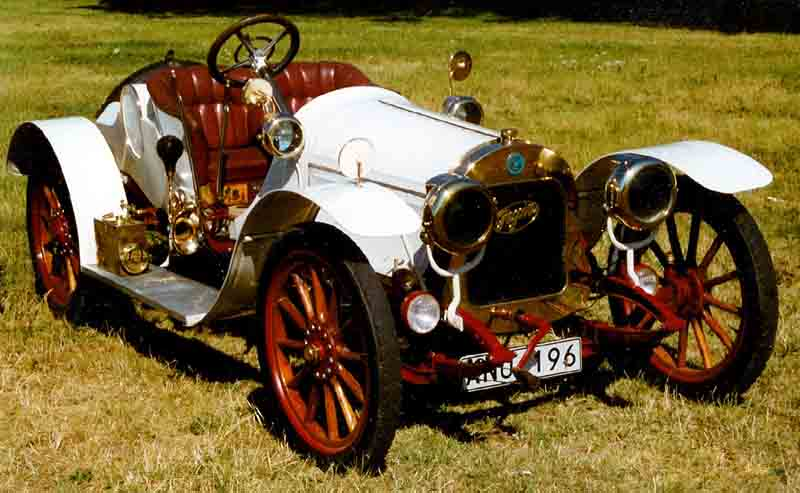
A 1908 Grégoire

After World War I, Grégoire introduced its first car with an overhead-valve engine. Although the engine was only 2.3 litre, the car could reach up to 62 mph (100 km/h). The manufacture of this model was expensive, and it had disappointing financial results. In 1923, Grégoire only produced engines for the Bignan company. Grégoire closed its factory down in 1924.

== Aero engines ==
At the 1902 Salon aéronautique, Grégoire offered engines for airships. From these, the company evolved towards aircraft engines- "Moteurs d'Aviation Grégoire-Gyp"- made at Suresnes. The initials of Pierre J. Grégoire (G.Y.P.) provided the name for these engines. They were built in various configurations, and in four variants by power and weight, from 25/30 cv, 60 kg, to 120/140 cv, 240 kg.
