= David Bruce-Brown =

American racing driver (1887–1912)

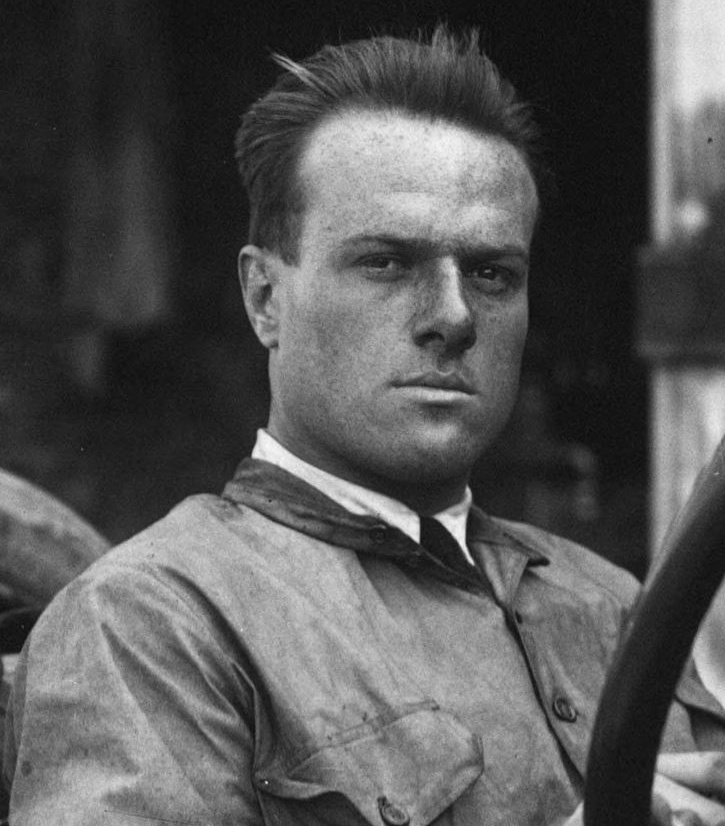
- Bruce-Brown at the 1912 French Grand Prix
- Born: David Loney Bruce-Brown; August 13, 1887 Manhattan, New York, U.S.
- Died: October 1, 1912 (aged 25) Wauwatosa, Wisconsin, U.S.

Champ Car career
- 6 races run over 3 years
- First race: 1910 Vanderbilt Cup (Long Island)
- Last race: 1912 Indianapolis 500 (Indianapolis)
- First win: 1911 American Grand Prize (Savannah)
Wins	Podiums	Poles
1	3	0

David Loney Bruce-Brown (August 13, 1887 – October 1, 1912) was an American racing driver.

== Early life ==
Bruce-Brown was born on August 13, 1887, the son of George Bruce-Brown (b. 1844) and Arabella Loney (b. 1853). He attended the Allen-Stephenson School in New York City, and then the Harstrom School in Norwalk, Connecticut, a prep school for Yale.

== Racing career ==
Having bluffed his way into auto racing at the age of 18, Bruce-Brown turned out to be a natural talent behind the wheel and won the 1908 Daytona Speed Trials. He then went on to win the American Grand Prize in both 1910 and 1911, as well as numerous other races. He also participated in the 1911 and 1912 editions of the Indianapolis 500, finishing 3rd in the inaugural event.

Bruce-Brown clocked in a 0.33 3-5 world's one-mile amateur straightaway record, beating the previous holder, William K. Vanderbilt Jr.'s record.

== Death ==
Bruce-Brown was killed during practice, along with his mechanic Tony Scudelari, for the 1912 American Grand Prize and 8th running of the Vanderbilt Cup races, which were held in Wauwatosa, Wisconsin, near Milwaukee. His car was repaired and driven by Barney Oldfield in the Grand Prize to a fourth-place finish. The coroner's jury which investigated his death determined that the road that they were racing on was too narrow.

== Motorsports career results ==
=== Indianapolis 500 results ===
Year	Car	Start	Qual	Rank	Finish	Laps	Led	Retired
1911	28	25	—	—	3	200	81	Running
1912	29	23	88.450	1	22	25	0	Valves
Totals						225	81	

Starts	2
Poles	0
Front Row	0
Wins	0
Top 5	1
Top 10	1
Retired	1

== Gallery ==
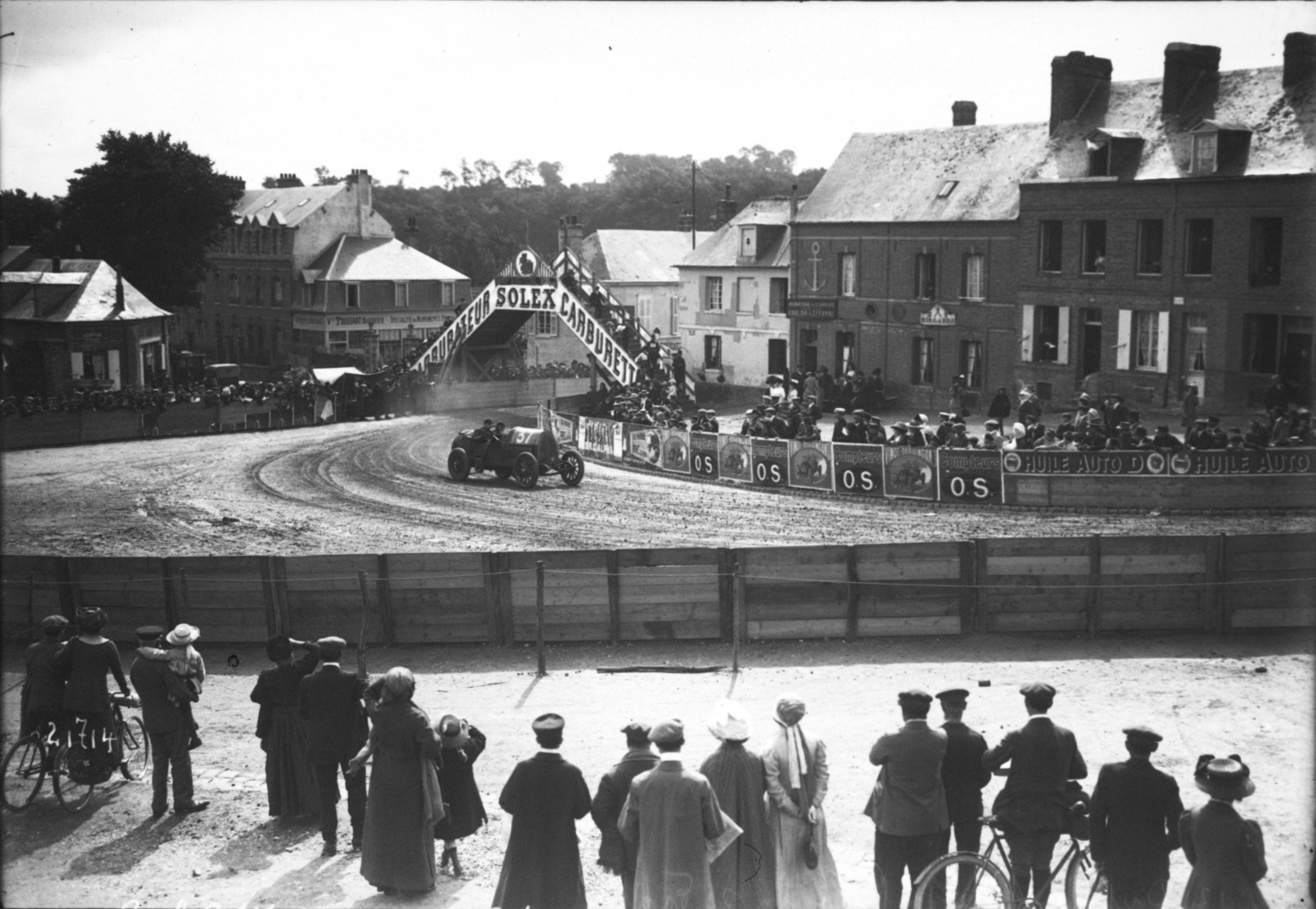
Bruce-Brown racing his Fiat at the 1912 French Grand Prix

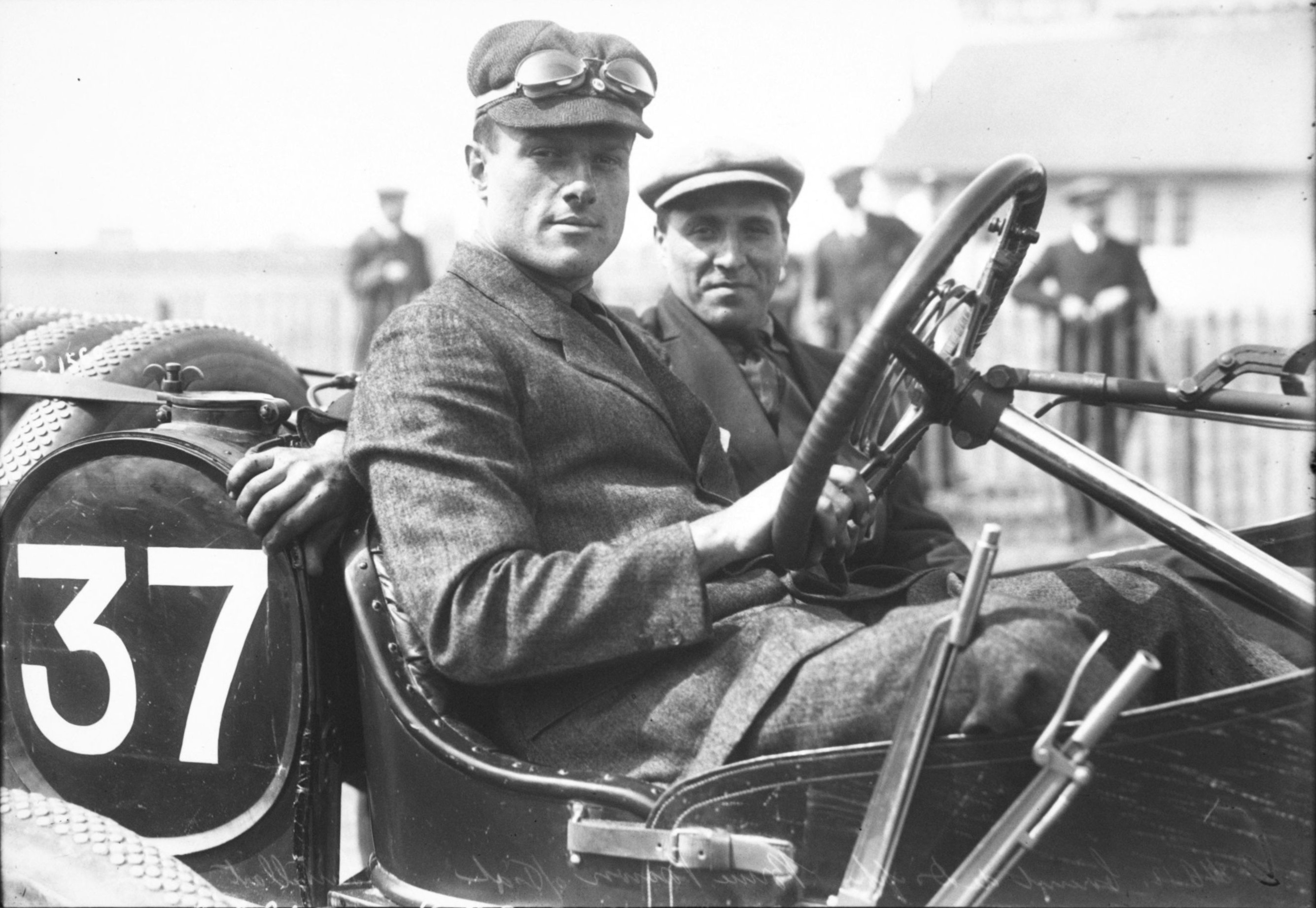
Bruce-Brown in his Fiat at the 1912 French Grand Prix

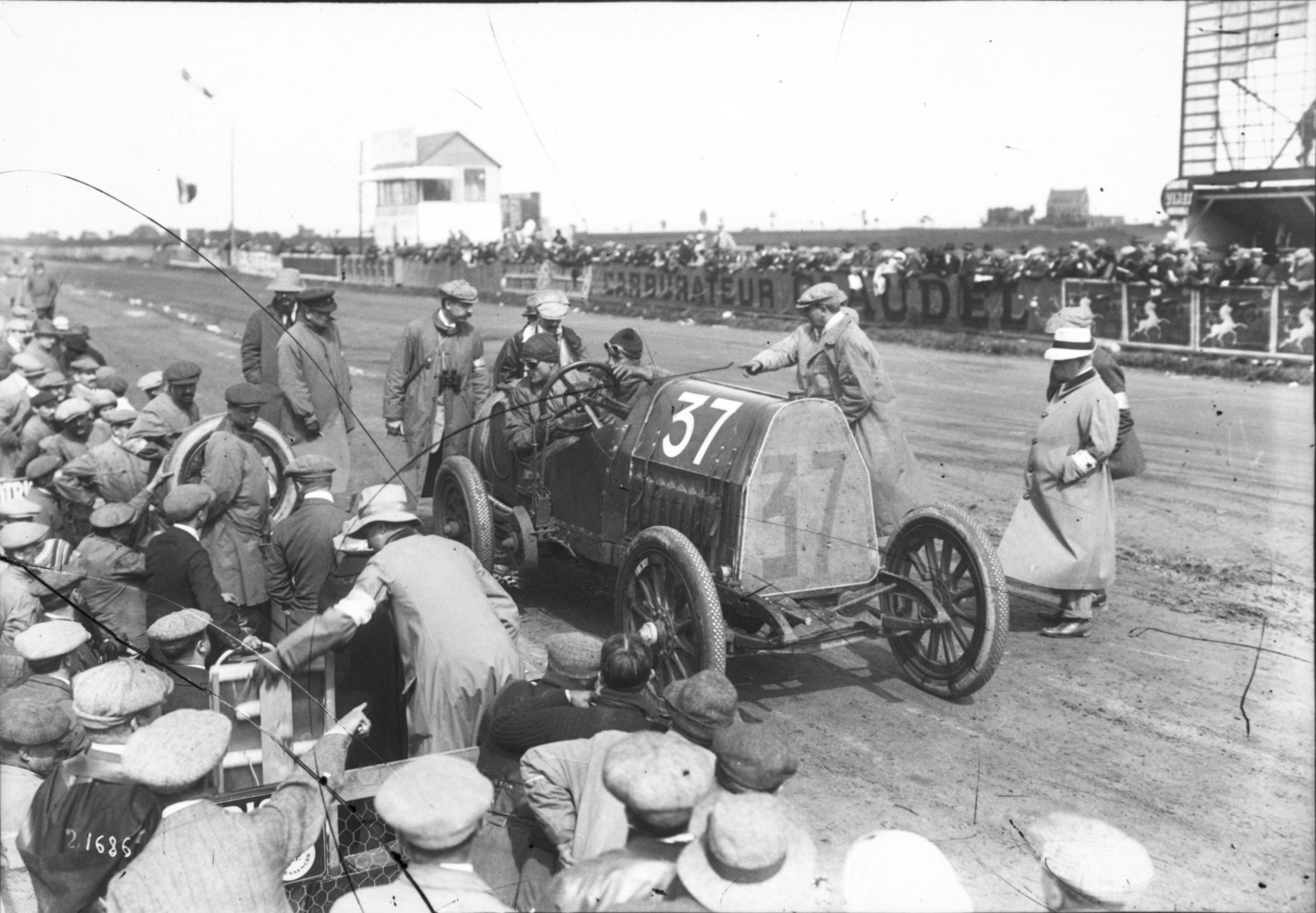
Bruce-Brown the 1912 French Grand Prix

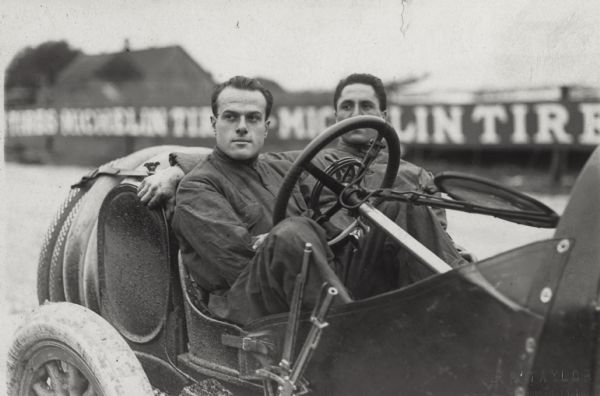
Bruce-Brown and his mechanic Tony Scudelari, shortly before they were killed in 1912.
