= Caleb Bragg =

American racing driver (1885–1943)

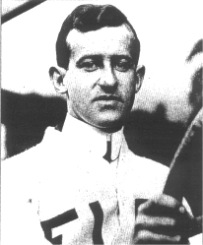
- Bragg at the 1912 Indianapolis 500
- Born: Caleb Smith Bragg; November 23, 1885 Cincinnati, Ohio, U.S.
- Died: October 24, 1943 (aged 57) Manhattan, New York, U.S.

Champ Car career
- 7 races run over 5 years
- First race: 1911 Indianapolis 500 (Indianapolis)
- Last race: 1915 Vanderbilt Cup (Panama–Pacific)
Wins	Podiums	Poles
0	1	0

Caleb Smith Bragg (November 23, 1885 – October 24, 1943) was an American racing driver, speedboat racer, aviation pioneer, and automotive inventor. He participated in the 1911, 1913 and 1914 Indianapolis 500. In speedboat racing, Bragg won three consecutive APBA Challenge Cup races in Detroit from 1923 to 1925. He was a co-inventor of the Bragg-Kliesrath brake.

== Early life ==
Bragg was born on November 23, 1885, in Cincinnati, Ohio, to Cais C. Bragg and Eugenia Hofer who were wealthy.

== Education ==
While at Yale University, Bragg became interested in automobile racing. Bragg graduated from Yale in 1908 and took a post-graduate engineering course at Massachusetts Institute of Technology in 1909.

== Racing career ==
On October 5, 1912, Bragg driving a 14 liter F.I.A.T. S74 took 1st place at the 1912 American Grand Prize race, the seventh and final race of the 1912 Grand Prix season. It was held at the Wauwatosa Road Race Course near Milwaukee, Wisconsin and was sanctioned by the Automobile Club of America. Bragg won by over 15 minutes over Erwin Bergdoll and his 9.5 liter 37/90 hp Benz. Bragg's average speed was 68.397 mph (110.074 km/h).

== Later career ==
During World War I, Bragg became interested in flying airplanes and in 1916 he flew his first solo flight; he later set airplane records for speed and altitude.

Bragg developed a braking system with Victor William Kliesrath called the Bragg-Kliesrath brake. They formed a company in 1920 and Ethel Merman was his personal secretary before she became famous. They sold the company to Bendix Corporation in the late 1920s.

In speedboat racing, Bragg won three consecutive APBA Challenge Cup races in Detroit from 1923 to 1925, in 1923 with Packard Chriscraft and the 1924-1925 races with Baby Bootlegger, the 29-foot mahogany wooden speedboat designed for him in 1924 by George Crouch and built by Henry Nevins.

== Personal life ==
Bragg died on October 24, 1943 in New York City, New York.

== Motorsports career results ==
=== Indianapolis 500 results ===
Year	Car	Start	Qual	Rank	Finish	Laps	Led	Retired
1911	39	35	—	—	37	24	0	Crash in pits
1913	19	1	87.340	2	15	128	1	Pump shaft
1914	21	9	92.970	7	19	117	1	Camshaft
Totals						269	2	

Starts	3
Poles	1
Front Row	1
Wins	0
Top 5	0
Top 10	0
Retired	3

== Gallery ==
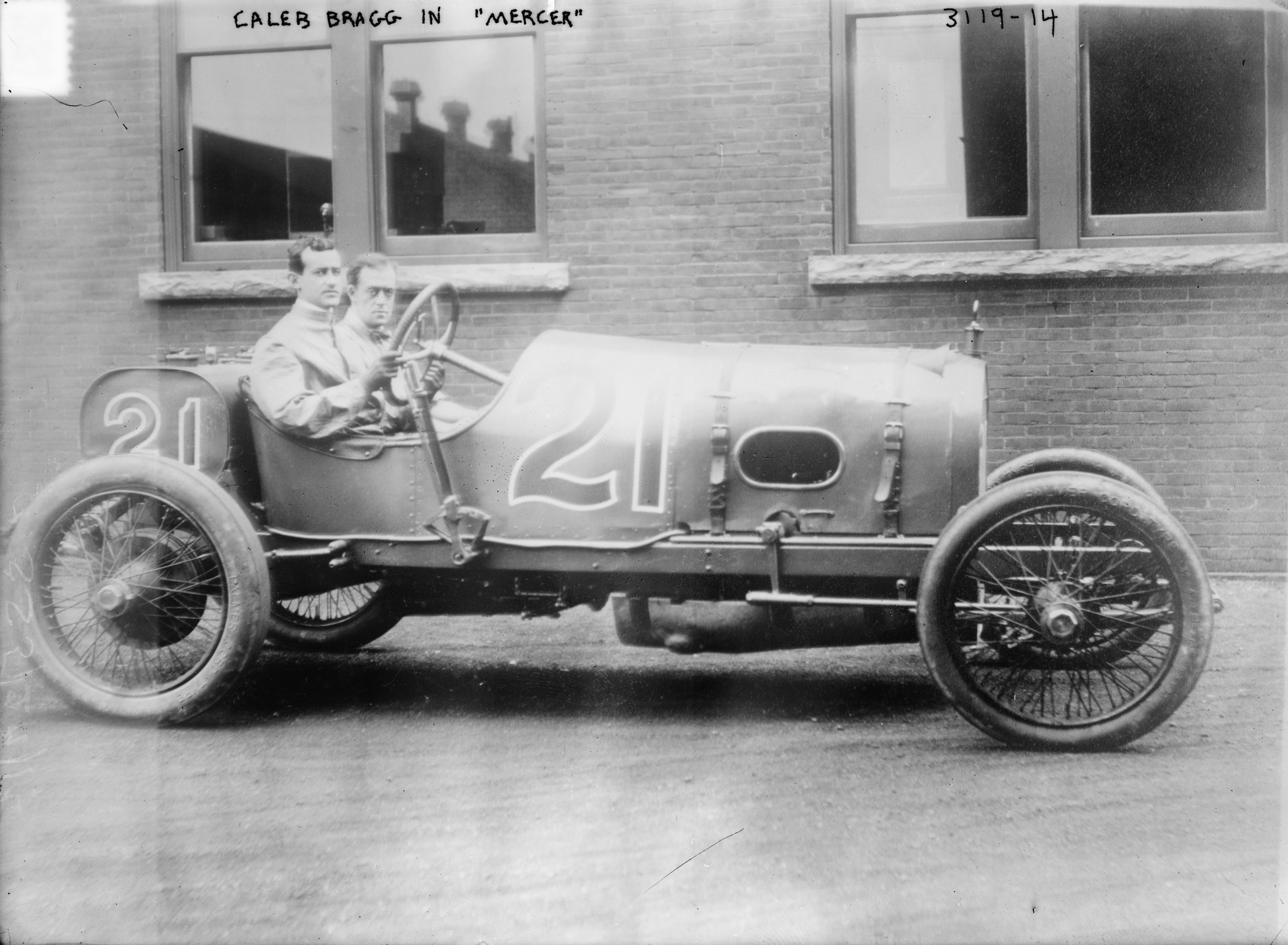
Bragg in his Mercer
