= Erwin Bergdoll =

American racing driver (1890–1965)

- Born: Erwin Rudolph Bergdoll; June 24, 1890 Philadelphia, Pennsylvania, U.S.
- Died: March 21, 1965 (aged 74) Camden, New Jersey, U.S.

Champ Car career
- 8 races run over 6 years
- First race: 1909 Founder's Week Trophy (Fairmount Park)
- Last race: 1914 Kalamazoo 100 (Kalamazoo)
- First win: 1911 Philadelphia Race #1 (Fairmount Park)
Wins	Podiums	Poles
1	4	0

Erwin Rudolph Bergdoll (June 24, 1890 – March 21, 1965) was an American racing driver who competed during the formative years of auto racing. He competed in AAA-sanctioned Championship Cars as well as in the American Grand Prize.

== Racing activities ==
Bergdoll was born into a wealthy brewing family. For a period of time his racing activities were managed by fellow Philadelphian Willie Haupt.

== Personal life ==
Bergdoll, along with his younger brother Grover Cleveland Bergdoll, dodged the draft during World War I. While Grover escaped to Germany, Erwin Bergdoll was apprehended and spent three years in prison.

A resident of Haddon Heights, New Jersey, Bergdoll died on March 21, 1965, at Cooper University Hospital at the age of 74.
