= Joe Horan =

American racing driver (1878–1961)

- Born: Joseph Henry Horan; November 6, 1878 Troy, New York, U.S.
- Died: February 19, 1961 (aged 82) Troy, New York, U.S.

Champ Car career
- 6 races run over 4 years
- First race: 1912 Indianapolis 500 (Indianapolis)
- Last race: 1914 50-mile Race #3 (Galveston)
Wins	Podiums	Poles
0	0	0

Joseph Henry Horan (November 6, 1878 – February 19, 1961) was an American racing driver who competed in the early years of the Indianapolis 500.

== Biography ==
Horan was born on November 6, 1878, in Troy, New York. During a practice run for the 1911 Indianapolis 500 on May 24, 1911, he was in an accident and broke his leg. One year later, Horan returned to qualify and drive in the race's second running.

== Motorsports career results ==
=== Indianapolis 500 results ===
Year	Car	Start	Qual	Rank	Finish	Laps	Led	Retired
1912	22	18	80.480	16	8	200	0	Running
Totals						200	0	

Starts	1
Poles	0
Front Row	0
Wins	0
Top 5	0
Top 10	1
Retired	0
