= Felice Nazzaro =

Italian racing driver (1881–1940)

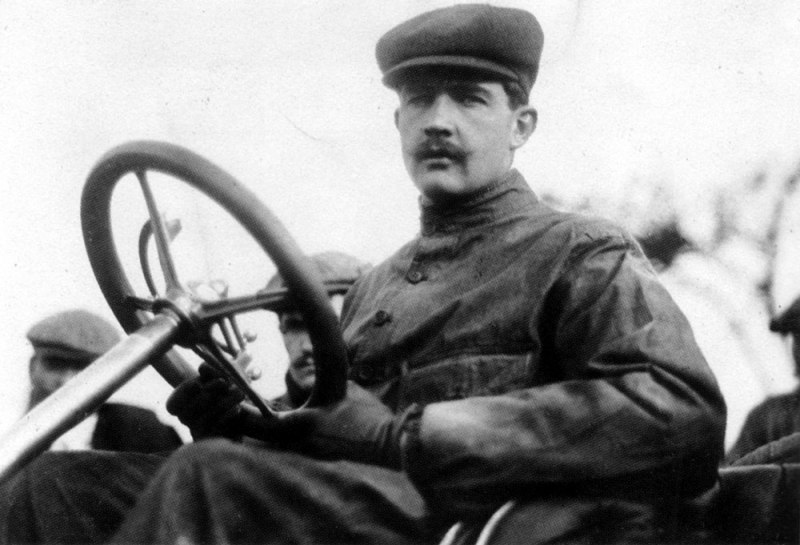
Felice Nazzaro in 1906

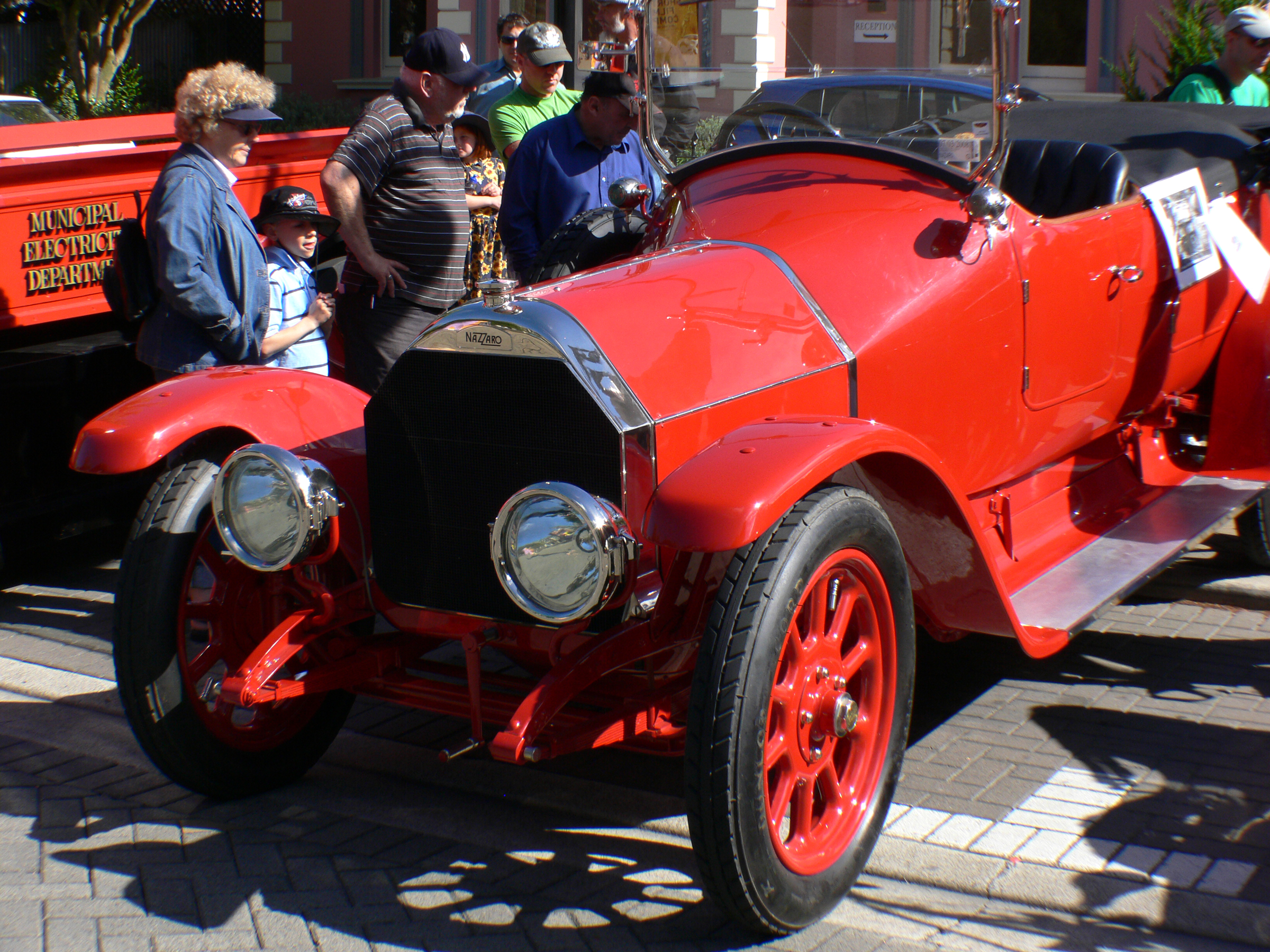
1913 Nazzaro Tipo 3

Felice Nazzaro (4 December 1881 – 21 March 1940) was an Italian racecar driver, a native of Turin. He won the Kaiserpreis in 1907 as well as the French Grand Prix in 1907 and 1922 and Targa Florio in 1907, and 1913. His European wins in 1907 resulted in an invitation to compete in the 1908 American Grand Prize in Savannah, Georgia, where he finished third. He returned to the United States for the 1910 event, but a damaged rear axle forced him out of the race. It was his victory in the 1908 Circuito di Bologna that inspired a young Enzo Ferrari to become a racing driver.

In 1911 he founded his own manufacturing company in Turin, Automobili Nazzaro, which produced circa 490 vehicles in total and won both the 1913 and 1920 Targa Florios, plus the 1914 Coppa Florio.

He continued racing until 1929 at the age of 48, and died in Turin in 1940 after a long illness at the age of 58.
