= Lozier =

Dufunct American Automobile company

Lozier Motor Company
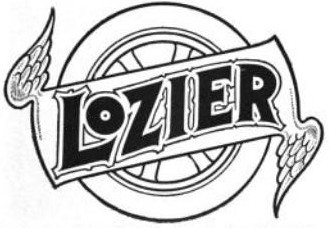
- Type: Automobile Manufacturing
- Industry: Automotive
- Genre: Touring cars, limousines
- Founded: 1900; 126 years ago
- Founder: Henry Abram Lozier
- Defunct: 1915, 1918
- Fate: Bankrupted
- Headquarters: Detroit, Michigan, United States
- Area served: United States
- Key people: George R. Burwell, John G. Perrin, Harry A. Lozier
- Products: Vehicles; Automotive parts

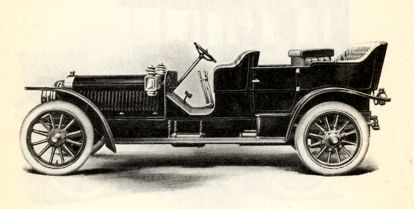
1908 Lozier, Model I (i) touring car

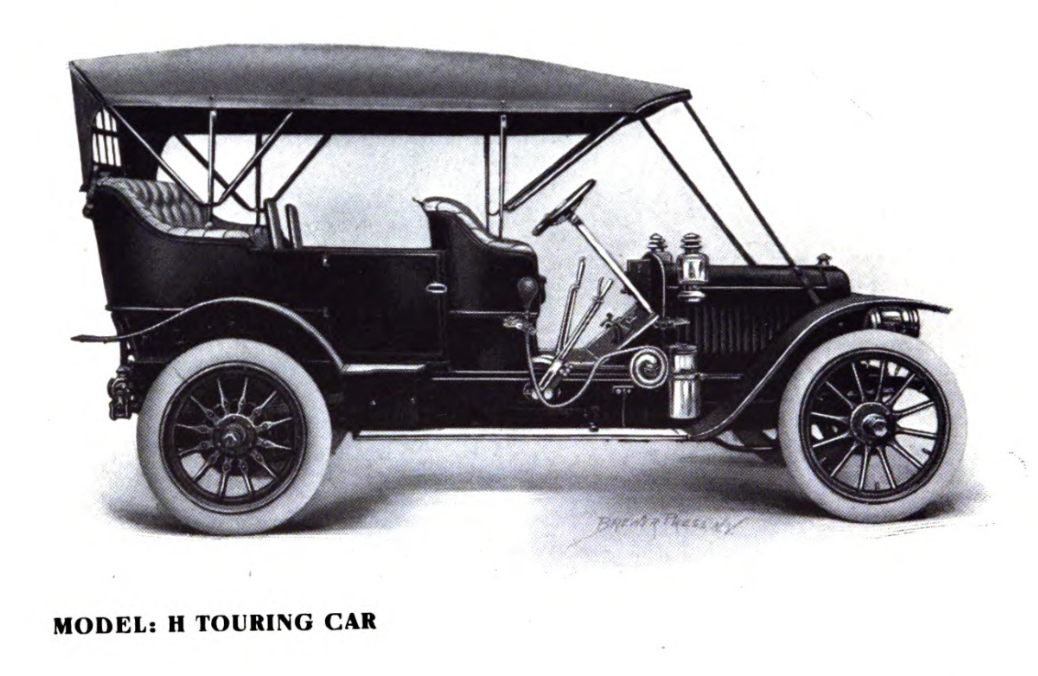
Lozier Model H (1908-1910)

Lozier Plant 1910

The Lozier Motor Company was a Brass Era producer of luxury automobiles in the United States. The company produced automobiles from 1900 to 1918, in Plattsburgh, New York and from 1910, at Detroit, Michigan.

== History ==
Lozier Motor Company was founded by Henry Abram Lozier, an Indiana-born sewing machine and bicycle manufacturer. After selling his bicycle business, Lozier moved to Plattsburgh to manufacture boat engines. In 1900, he entered the automobile business. At his death in 1903, his son Harry took over the company.

Loziers were luxury cars and for a time were the most expensive cars produced in the United States. The 1910 model line featured cars priced between $4,600 and $7,750, (equivalent to $267,790 in 2025).

The company was moved to Detroit in 1910. In 1911, a Lozier was entered into the first running of the Indianapolis 500. The car, in the hands of Ralph Mulford, finished second in a controversial scoring decision and many observers felt Mulford's Lozier had actually won the race. On March 19 the same year, Lozier ads claimed, a stock 49 hp (37 kW) model piloted by Teddy Tetzlaff set a world record for 100 mi (160 km) at 1:14:29. The company developed its braking system using pressurized water to cool hollowed brake drums. This led to claims that Lozier's brakes were "impossible to burn out".

The company faced new pressures as more manufacturers entered the luxury market. Frederick C. Chandler, Lozier's top designer, left the company in 1913 and formed the Chandler Motor Company which produced cars similar to the Lozier but at a substantially lower sales price. Chandler took several top company executives with him producing a brain drain from which the company never recovered.

At the 1913 Los Angeles Motordrome, the company introduced the 88 hp (66 kW) Big Six, with electric headlights, with tourers and roadsters at US$5,000, limousines and landaulettes at US$6,500. It was joined by the 52 hp (40 kW) Light Six Metropolitan, with electric starter and lights; the tourer and runabout were US$3,250, coupe US$3,850, and limousine US$4,450.

Because of Lozier's limited market niche, the company only produced a few thousand cars during its lifespan. Production peaked in the 1912 model year at 600 cars.

Lozier tried to expand into the mid-priced car market and in 1914 offered a four-cylinder car priced at US$2,000. The new four was not a sales success and company finances continued to falter. After a failed attempt to merge with Ford Motor Company, the company declared bankruptcy in 1915. Attempted re-organizations and production continued sporadically up to 1918.

== Production models ==
- Lozier Model D
- Lozier Model D Limousine
- Lozier Model E Touring
- Lozier Model F Limousine
- Lozier Model G
- Lozier Model H
- Lozier Model I

== Advertisements ==
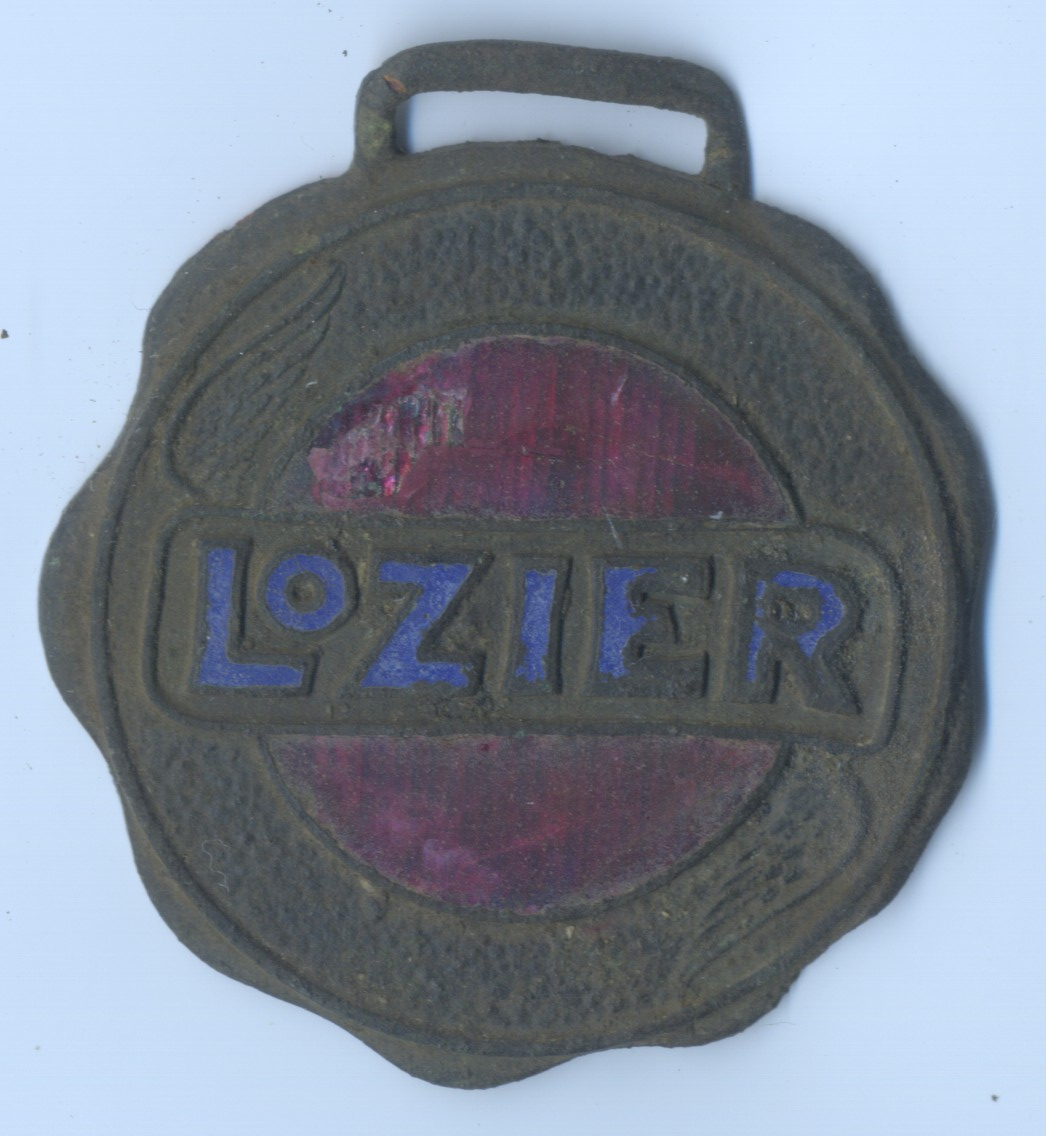

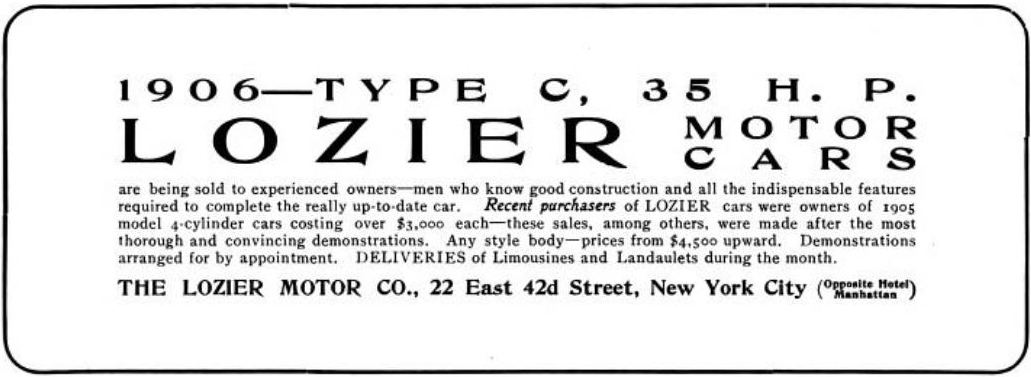
The Lozier Motor Company of New York City – 1905

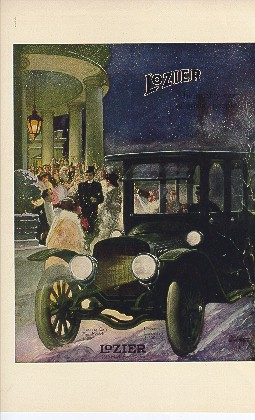
Image from a 1912 advertisement for a Lozier touring car priced at $5,000.

== See also ==
- List of defunct United States automobile manufacturers
- List of automobile manufacturers
