= Len Zengel =

American racing driver (1887–1963)

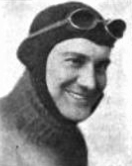
- Zengel in 1912
- Born: Leonard Joseph Zengel; March 15, 1887 Dayton, Ohio, U.S.
- Died: September 24, 1963 (aged 76) Bryn Mawr, Pennsylvania, U.S.

Champ Car career
- 4 races run over 3 years
- First race: 1909 Founder's Week Trophy (Fairmount Park)
- Last race: 1912 Indianapolis 500 (Indianapolis)
- First win: 1911 Elgin National Trophy (Elgin)
Wins	Podiums	Poles
1	2	0

Leonard Joseph Zengel (March 15, 1887 – September 24, 1963) was an American racing driver.

== Biography ==
Zengel was born on March 15, 1887, in Dayton, Ohio, to Leonard A. Zengel (1857-1930) and Jennie L. Pomeroy (1862-1936). He had seven siblings.

On October 8, 1910, Zengel won the annual Fairmount Park road race in Philadelphia driving a Chadwick Engineering Works auto.

In 1911, Zengel won the Elgin Trophy.

Zengel participated in the 1912 Indianapolis 500.

Zengel married Mary L. Howell and had a son, Leonard Joseph Zengel Jr. (1915-1944) who died in a car accident when he fell asleep at the wheel in Pittsburgh, Pennsylvania. He had a daughter, Betty Jean Zengel.

Zengel operated a Chrysler and Plymouth dealership.

Zengel died on September 24, 1963, in Bryn Mawr, Pennsylvania, at age 76.

== Motorsports career results ==
=== Indianapolis 500 results ===
Year	Car	Start	Qual	Rank	Finish	Laps	Led	Retired
1912	2	2	78.850	19	6	200	0	Running
Totals						200	0	

Starts	1
Poles	0
Front Row	1
Wins	0
Top 5	0
Top 10	1
Retired	0
