= 1912 Indianapolis 500 =

American motor race

2nd Indianapolis 500
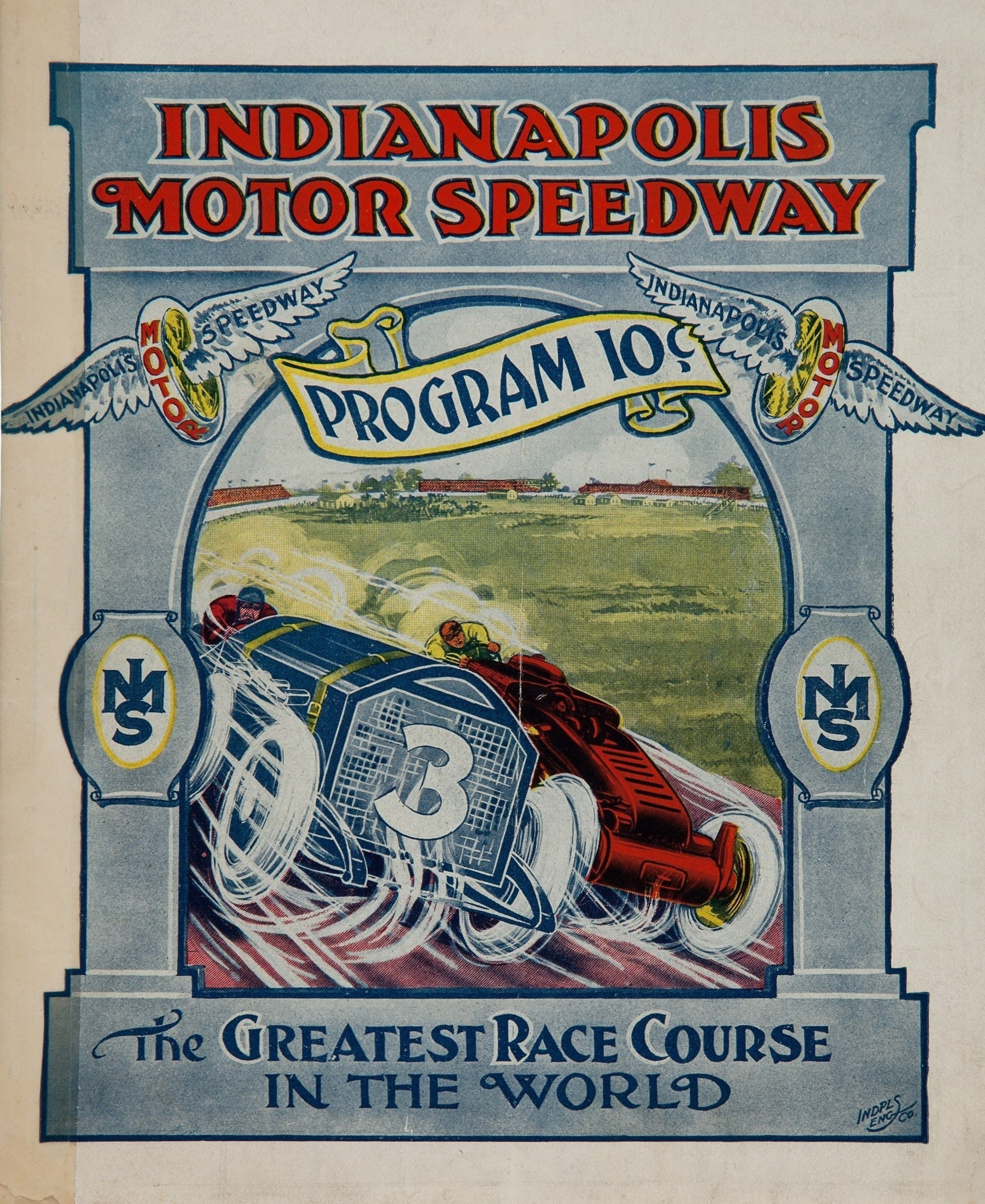

Indianapolis Motor Speedway

Indianapolis 500
- Sanctioning body: AAA
- Date: May 30, 1912
- Winner: Joe Dawson
- Winning Riding Mechanic: Harry Martin
- Winning Entrant: National Motor Vehicle Company
- Winning time: 6:21:06
- Average speed: 78.719 mph (126.686 km/h)
- Pole position: Gil Andersen
- Pole speed: N/A
- Most laps led: Ralph DePalma (196)

Pre-race
- Pace car: Stutz
- Pace car driver: Carl G. Fisher
- Starter: Fred J. Wagner
- Honorary referee: R. P. Hooper
- Estimated attendance: 75,000

Chronology
Previous	Next
1911	1913

The 1912 Indianapolis 500-Mile Race, or International 500-Mile Sweepstakes Race, the second such race in history, was held at the Indianapolis Motor Speedway on Thursday, May 30, 1912. Indiana-born driver Joe Dawson won the race, leading only the final two laps. Ralph DePalma dominated the race, leading 196 of the 200 laps, and pulling out to an over 5-lap lead. But with just over two laps to go, his car failed with a broken connecting rod.

== Summary ==
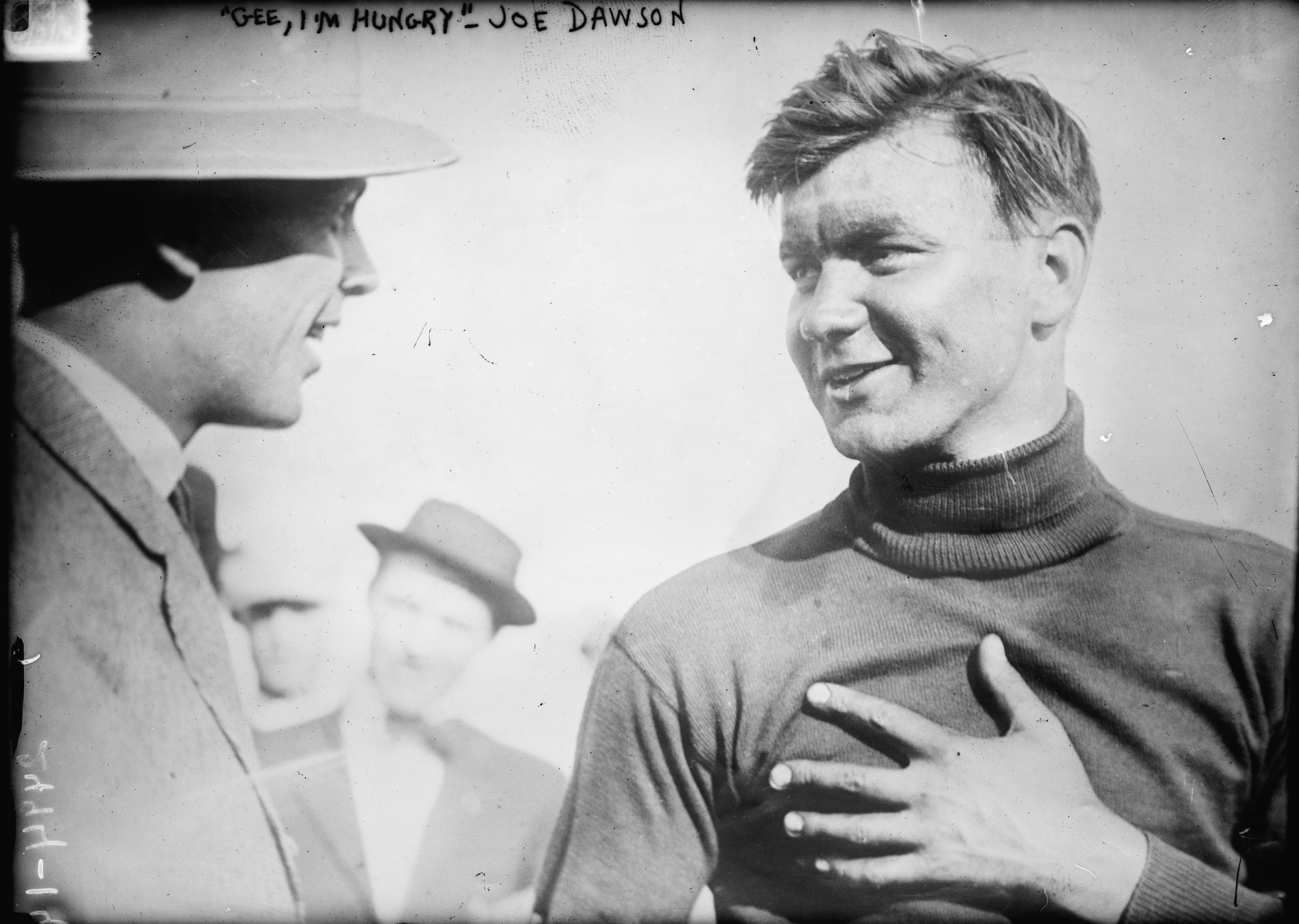
Dawson after winning

In the aftermath of victory by Ray Harroun in the single-seat Marmon "Wasp" in the first 500-Mile Race the year before, new rules made the presence of riding mechanics mandatory; maximum engine size remained 600 cubic inches (9.83 liters) displacement. At $50,000, the race purse was nearly double that of 1911.

Out of 29 original entries, 24 qualified for the race by sustaining a speed faster than a minimum of 75 mph (120.7 km/h) for a full lap, an increase from the quarter-mile qualifying distance of the inaugural year. David Bruce-Brown was fastest at 88.45 mph (142.35 km/h), but starting positions were again determined by entry date. Lining up five cars to the first four rows and four to a fifth, a change from the previous year's starting method was movement of the pace car, a Stutz, from the inside of the first row to out in front of the field.

Upon wave of the then-red starting flag, Teddy Tetzlaff took the lead in a Fiat from the third starting position in the center of the first row, and lead for the first two laps before being overtaken by the grey # 4 Mercedes of Ralph DePalma.

DePalma's domination of most of the event was total, as he built an eventual five-and-a-half lap, eleven-minute advantage over second, and lead uncontested for the next 194 laps. On lap 87, DePalma led his 85th lap and became the all-time Indianapolis 500 lap leader with 89 laps led (he led 4 laps in the 1911 race), a title he would hold until lap 200 of the 1987 race, 75 years later. But at the beginning of lap 197, as his Mercedes began misfiring, and slowed on the main stretch at the conclusion of the lap. Nursed through the 198th lap by DePalma at reduced speed, the car finally lost all power at the end of the backstretch on lap 199, as a broken connecting rod tore a hole in the crankcase.

With the car's momentum carrying it around to the fourth turn, DePalma and riding mechanic Rupert Jeffkins then entered themselves into motor racing lore, as well as inspired the cheers of the more than 80,000 in attendance, as they climbed from the vehicle and begin pushing it down the five-eighths of a mile main stretch toward the start-finish line.

Indianapolis driver Joe Dawson and riding mechanic Harry Martin, running in the second position for most of the race in their blue and white National Motor Vehicle Company entry, finally passed DePalma midway down the main stretch to assume the lead for the concluding two laps, a record that would be held for the fewest led laps in history until 2011, following DePalma's 196 laps in the lead being the most ever in a race by a non-winner. Finishing more than ten minutes ahead of newly-second place Tetzlaff, Dawson completed another two laps for good measure upon fear of a scoring miscue. Sometime thereafter, DePalma and Jeffkins finally brought their car across the line, but in twofold futile endeavour: Speedway rules, requiring that all entries move under their own power, marked DePalma's final number of circuits at 198, and the push across the line, even if it counted, brought them only to the beginning of the final lap.

Dawson's run in the American-manufactured, four-cylinder National, with a winning time of 6:21:06 and averaging 78.719 mph (126.686 km/h), was twenty-one minutes two seconds faster than the previous 1911 record; The National team garnered $20,000 and additional contingency awards.

Throughout the remainder of the field, only the top ten finishers earned prize money, rules stipulating all entries complete the 500 miles (800 km) to collect. Ralph Mulford, being forced to stop numerous times due to clutch problems in his Knox, found irritation with the requirement and proceeded to drive on, long after all others were presented the chequered flag...and even after Speedway president Carl Fisher and starter Fred Wagner left the grounds (the latter after getting into an argument over whether to flag Mulford off before he had completed the distance, Wagner in favor and Fisher against).

Through numerous accounts of the run, including his reportedly changing shock absorbers for a gentler ride, as well as stopping for a dinner-on-the-go of fried chicken and ice-cream with his riding mechanic, Mulford's finish finally arrived, amid deserted grandstands and a setting sun over the main straightaway, 8 hours and 53 minutes after the start (approximately 6:53 p.m. local time), and with an average speed of 56.285 mph (90.582 km/h), which remains a record: the slowest finishing speed to date in 500 history.

== Starting grid ==
Entries were required to complete one lap in excess of 75 mph in order to qualify. However, starting grid was determined by order of entry date.

Driver		Far Inside		Inside Center		Center		Outside Center		Far Outside	
Time	(mph)	Far Inside		Inside Center		Center		Outside Center		Far Outside	
Row 1		(United States) Gil Andersen		(United States) Len Zengel R		(United States) Teddy Tetzlaff		(United States) Ralph DePalma		(United States) Eddie Hearne	
Row 1		1:51.21	80.93	1:54.14	78.85	1:46.84	84.24	1:44.63	86.02	1:49.96	81.85
Row 2		(United States) Spencer Wishart		(United States) Joe Dawson		(United States) Howdy Wilcox		(United States) Harry Knight		(United States) Bert Dingley R	
Row 2		1:47.21	83.95	1:44.49	86.13	1:43.21	87.20	1:58.55	75.92	1:51.43	80.77
Row 3		(United States) John Jenkins R		(United States) Bob Burman		(United States) Eddie Rickenbacker R (*)		(United States) Billy Leisaw R		(United States) Bill Endicott	
Row 3		1:51.36	80.82	1:47.00	84.11	1:56.43	77.30	1:56.11	77.51	1:51.70	80.57
Row 4		(United States) Ralph Mulford		(United Kingdom) Hughie Hughes		(United States) Joe Horan R		(United States) Mel Marquette		(United States) Len Ormsby R	
Row 4		1:42.41	87.88	1:50.01	81.81	1:51.83	80.48	1:55.27	78.08	1:47.03	84.09
Row 5		(United States) Joe Matson R		(United States) Charlie Merz		(United States) David Bruce-Brown		(United States) Louis Disbrow			
Row 5		1:52.64	79.90	1:54.10	78.88	1:41.75	88.45	1:57.59	76.54		

Note: (*) Car qualified by Lee Frayer

== Box score ==
Finish	No	Driver	Entrant	Chassis	Engine	Cyl	Displ (in^{3})	Color	Qual (mph)	Rank	Grid	Laps	Time/Status
1	8	(United States) Joe Dawson (Don Herr Laps 108–144)	National Motor Vehicle Company	National	National	4	491	blue/white	86.13	4	7	200	6:21:06
2	3	(United States) Teddy Tetzlaff (Caleb Bragg)	E. E. Hewlett	Fiat	Fiat	4	589	red	84.24	6	3	200	+10:23
3	21	(United Kingdom) Hughie Hughes	Mercer Motors Company	Mercer	Mercer	4	301	yellow	81.81	11	17	200	+12:03
4	28	(United States) Charlie Merz (Billy Knipper)	Ideal Motor Car Company	Stutz	Wisconsin	4	390	gray	78.88	18	22	200	+13:34
5	18	(United States) Bill Endicott (Harry Endicott)	Schacht Motor Car Company	Schacht	Wisconsin	4	390	red	80.57	15	15	200	+25:22
6	2	(United States) Len Zengel R (Billy Knipper)	Ideal Motor Car Company	Stutz	Wisconsin	4	390	gray	78.85	19	2	200	+29:22
7	14	(United States) John Jenkins R (Charlie Arnold)	White Motor Company	White	White	6	490	white	80.827	13	11	200	+31:32
7	22	(United States) Joe Horan R (George Ainslee)	Dr. W. H. Chambers	Lozier	Lozier	4	545	white/red	80.48	16	18	200	+38:32
9	9	(United States) Howdy Wilcox (Bill Rader)	National Motor Vehicle Company	National	National	4	590	blue/white	87.20	3	8	200	+50:24
10	19	(United States) Ralph Mulford	Ralph Mulford	Knox	Knox	6	597	white/red	87.88	2	16	200	+2:31:54
11	4	(United States) Ralph DePalma	E. J. Schroeder	Mercedes	Mercedes	4	583	gray	86.02	5	4	198	Connecting rod
12	15	(United States) Bob Burman	Clark-Carter Auto Company	Cutting	Cutting	4	598	white/red	84.11	7	12	157	Crash T2
13	12	(United States) Bert Dingley R	Bert Dingley	Simplex	Simplex	4	597	red/white	80.77	14	10	116	Connecting rod
14	25	(United States) Joe Matson R	O. Applegate	Lozier	Lozier	4	545	white/red	79.90	17	21	110	Crankshaft
15	7	(United States) Spencer Wishart	Spencer Wishart	Mercedes	Mercedes	4	583	gray/black/red	83.95	9	6	82	Water connection
16	1	(United States) Gil Andersen	Ideal Motor Car Company	Stutz	Wisconsin	4	390	gray/white	80.93	12	1	80	Crash T3
17	17	(United States) Billy Leisaw R (W. H. Farr)	Will Thomson	Marquette	Buick	4	594	tan/red	77.51	21	14	72	Caught fire
18	46	(United States) Louis Disbrow (Neil Whalen)	J. I. Case T. M. Company	Case	Case	6	450	white/red	76.54	23	24	67	Differential pin
19	23	(United States) Mel Marquette	Speed Motors Company	McFarlan	McFarlan	6	425	gray	78.08	20	19	63	Broken wheels
20	6	(United States) Eddie Hearne (Neil Whalen)	J. I. Case T. M. Company	Case	Case	6	450	white/red	81.85	10	5	55	Burned bearing
21	16	(United States) Eddie Rickenbacker R	Columbus Buggy Company	Fiat	Firestone-Columbus	4	345	crimson/black	77.30	22	13	43	Intake valve
22	29	(United States) David Bruce-Brown	National Motor Vehicle Company	National	National	4	590	blue/white	88.45	1	23	25	Valve trouble
23	10	(United States) Harry Knight	Lexington Motor Car Company	Lexington	Lexington	6	422	brown/white	75.92	24	9	6	Engine trouble
24	26	(United States) Len Ormsby R	I. C. Stern & B. C. Noble	Opel	Opel	4	450	gray/red	84.09	8	20	5	Connecting rod

Note: Relief drivers in parentheses

R Indianapolis 500 Rookie

=== Race statistics ===
Lap Leaders
Laps	Leader
1–2	Teddy Tetzlaff
3–198	Ralph DePalma
199–200	Joe Dawson

Total laps led
Laps	Leader
Ralph DePalma	196
Teddy Tetzlaff	2
Joe Dawson	2

== Notes ==
Race field average engine displacement:

- 491.46 in^{3} / 8.05 L

Race field average qualifying speed:

- 81.762 mph / 131.583 km/h

Finishing entries average time and finishing speed:

- 6:57:25 (-8:02 from previous year and previous record)
- 72.457 mph / 116.609 km/h (+1.717 mph / +2.763 km/h, from previous year and previous record)

== Race details ==
- For 1912, riding mechanics were made mandatory.
- Don Herr relieved Joe Dawson for several laps.

== Gallery ==
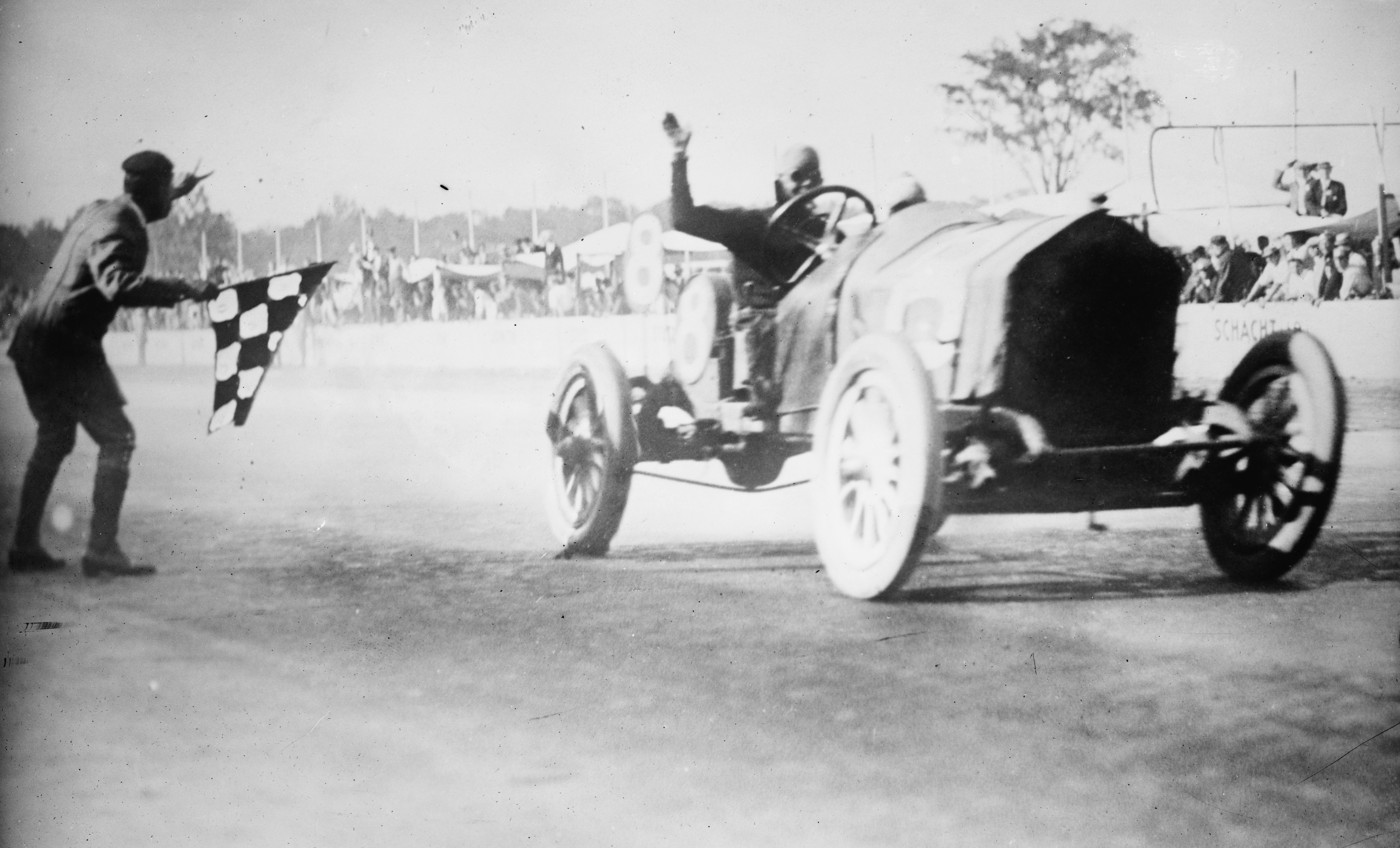
Joe Dawson winning the race

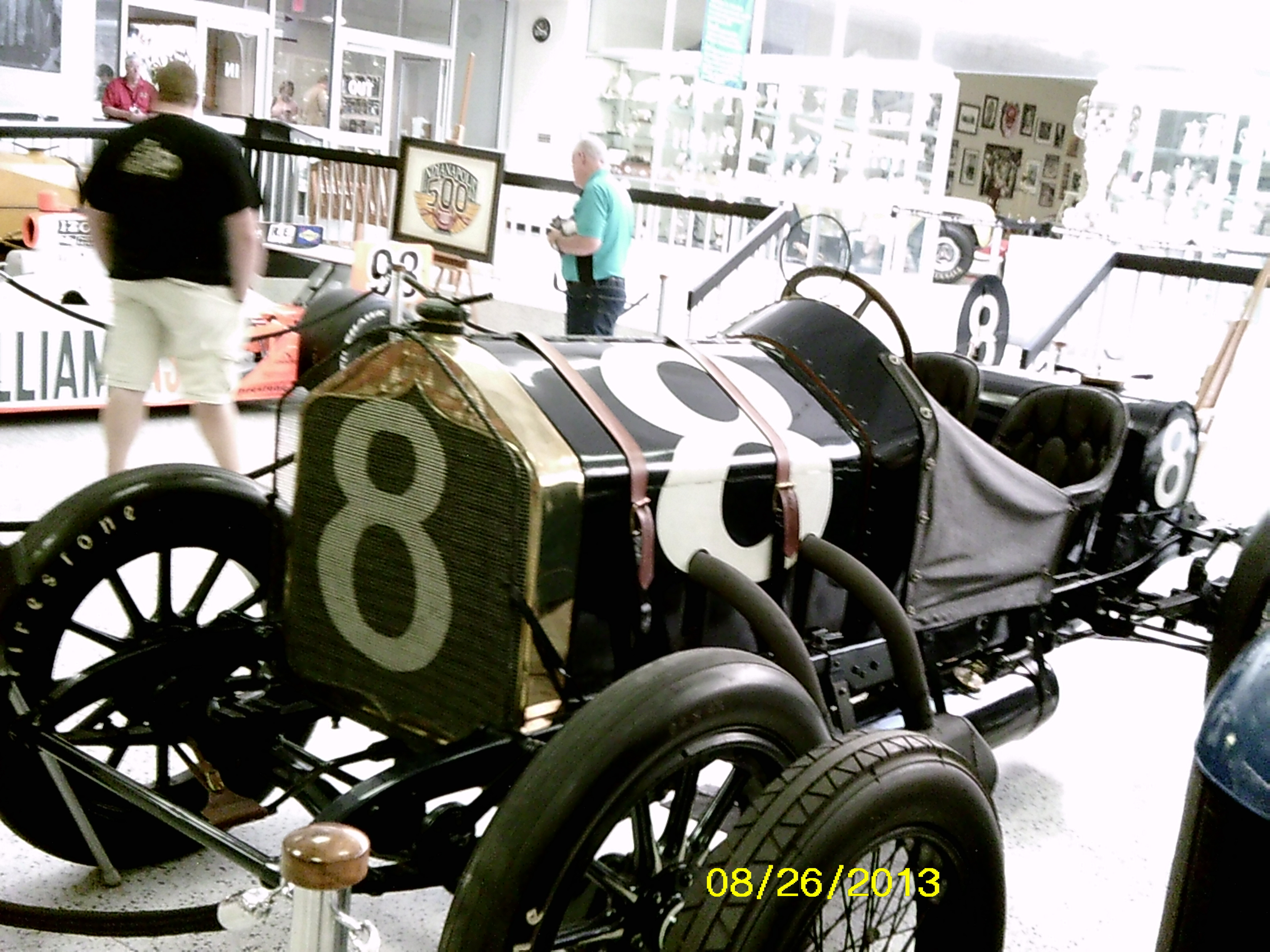
1912 winning car, now located at the Indianapolis Motor Speedway Hall of Fame and Museum

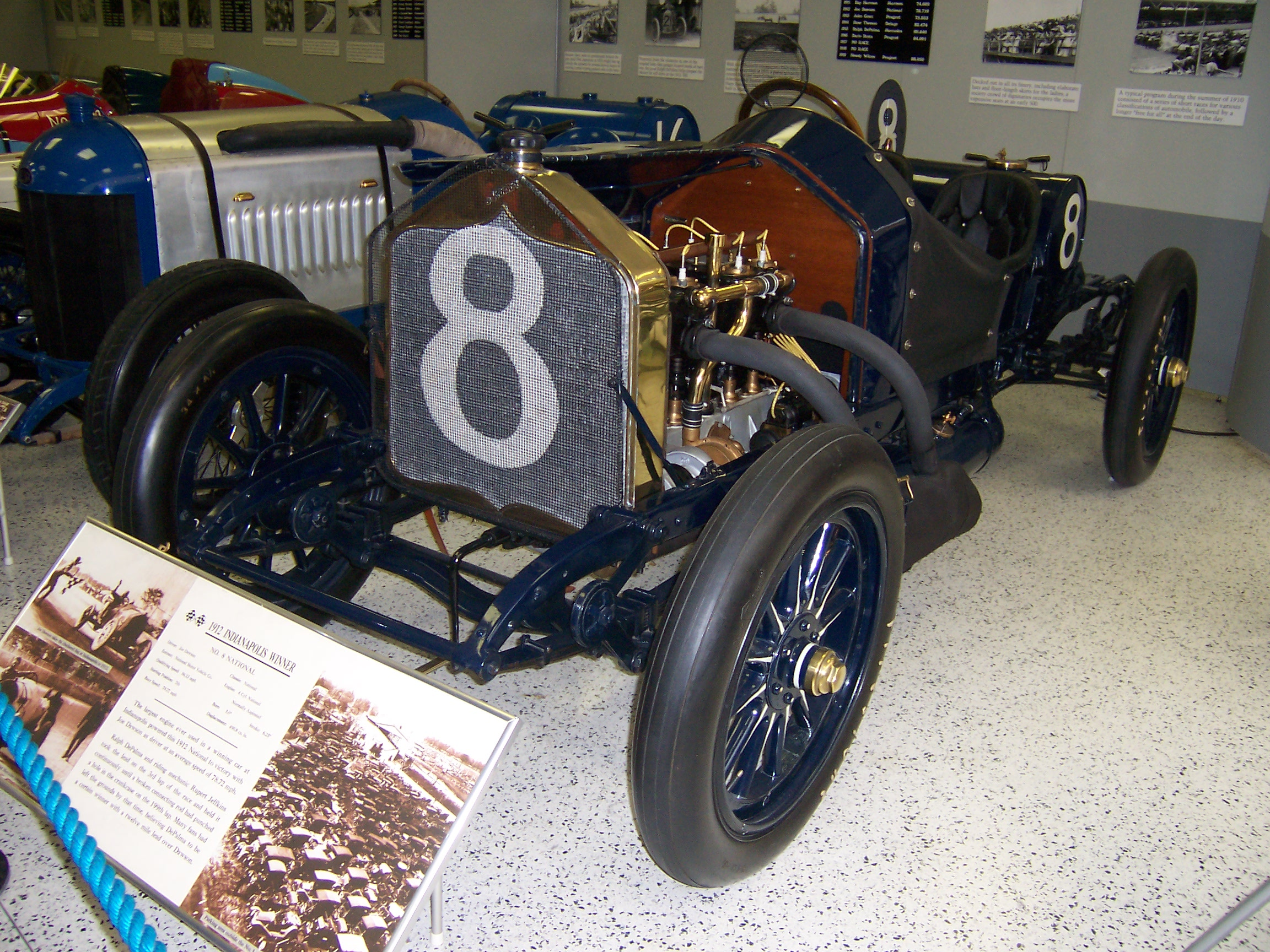
1912 winning car, now located at the Indianapolis Motor Speedway Hall of Fame and Museum

Ralph DePalma and Rupert Jeffkins, pushing the Mercedes down the main straightaway at the conclusion of the 1912 500-Mile Race.

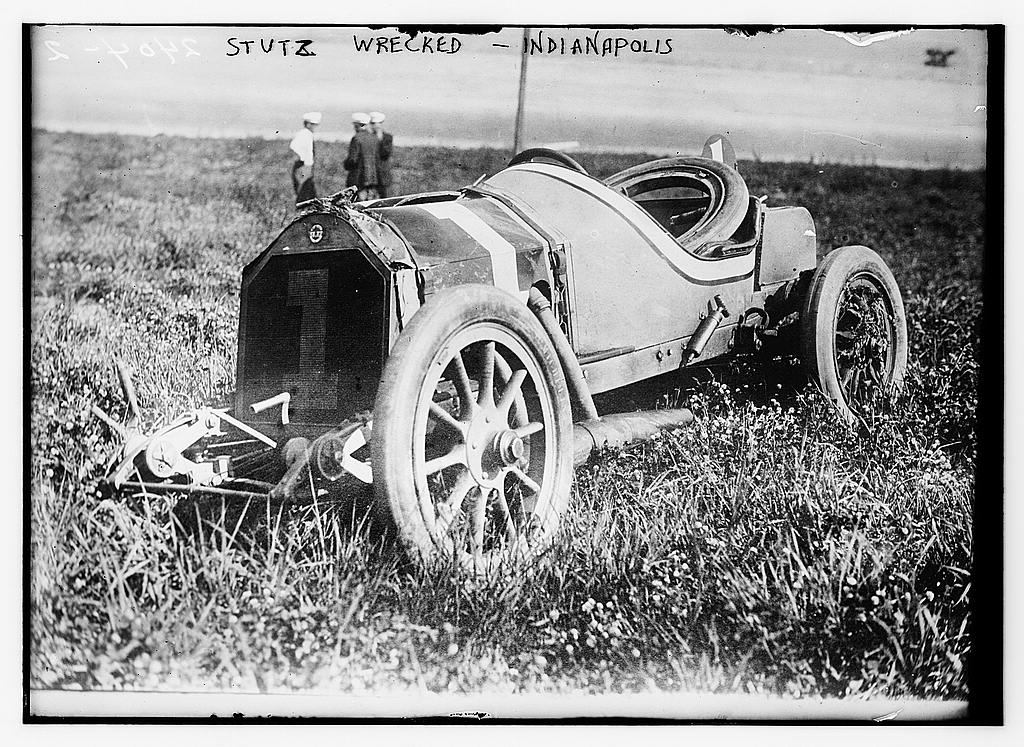
Gil Andersen's crashed Stutz at T3.

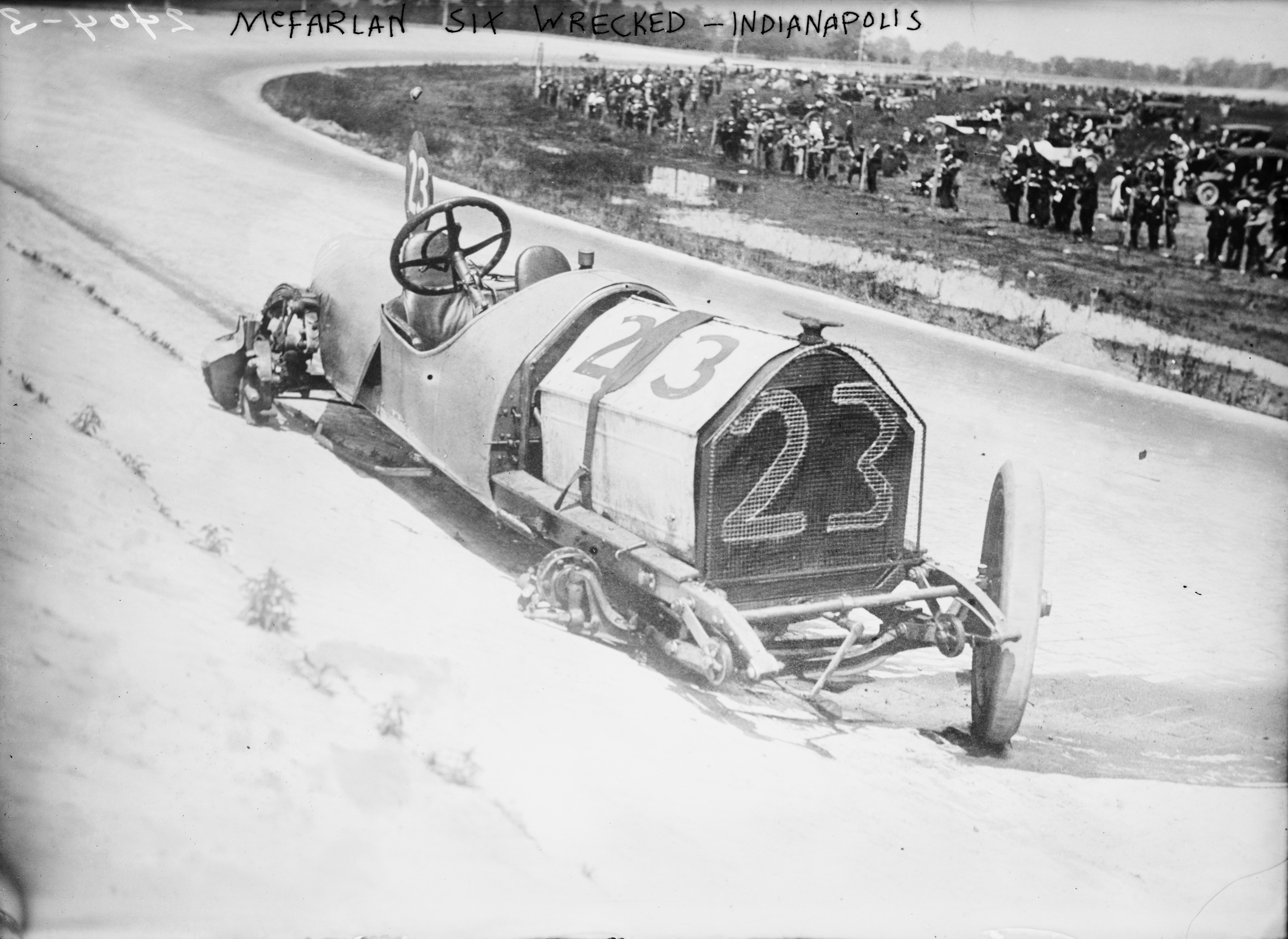
Mel Marquette's wrecked McFarlan.

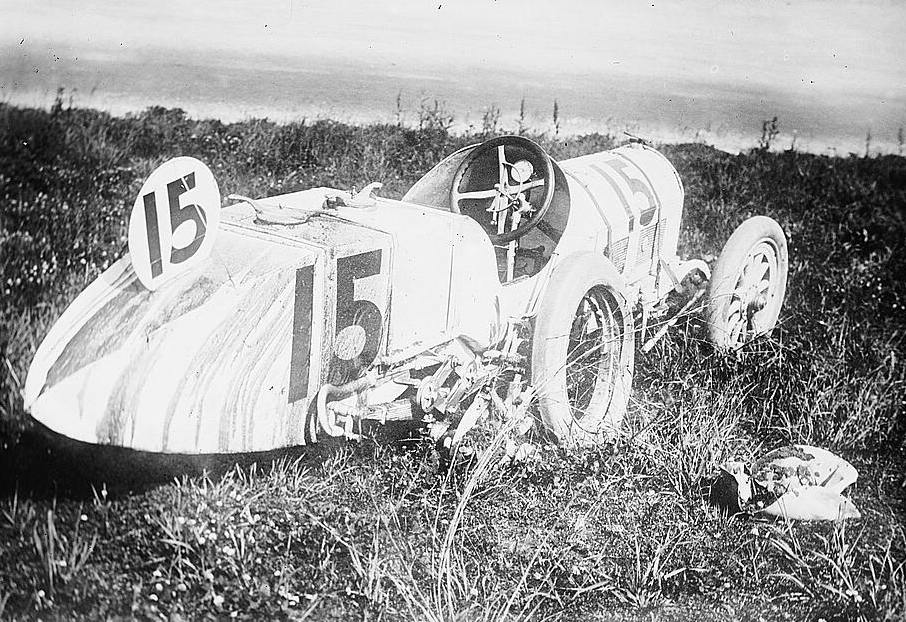
Bob Burman's crashed Cutting

== Works cited ==
- Popely, Rick and L. Spencer Riggs. Indianapolis 500 Chronicle. Lincolnwood, Illinois: Publications International, Ltd., 1999. ISBN 978-0-7853-2798-1
- 2006 Indianapolis 500 Official Program

1911 Indianapolis 500; Ray Harroun	1912 Indianapolis 500; Joe Dawson	1913 Indianapolis 500; Jules Goux
Preceded by 74.602 mph (1911 Indianapolis 500)	Record for the fastest average speed 78.719 mph	Succeeded by 82.474 mph (1914 Indianapolis 500)
