= Len Ormsby =

American racing driver (1890–1983)

- Born: Leonard Dorman Ormsby; September 21, 1890 New York, New York, U.S.
- Died: March 13, 1983 (aged 92) San Antonio, Texas, U.S.

Champ Car career
- 2 races run over 1 year
- First race: 1912 Indianapolis 500 (Indianapolis)
- Last race: 1912 Brighton Beach Race (Brighton Beach)
Wins	Podiums	Poles
0	0	0

Leonard Dorman Ormsby (September 21, 1890 – March 13, 1983) was an American racing driver.

== Motorsports career results ==
=== Indianapolis 500 results ===
Year	Car	Start	Qual	Rank	Finish	Laps	Led	Retired
1912	24	20	84.090	8	24	5	0	Rod
Totals						5	0	

Starts	1
Poles	0
Front Row	0
Wins	0
Top 5	0
Top 10	0
Retired	1
