= Charlie Merz =

American racing driver (1888–1952)

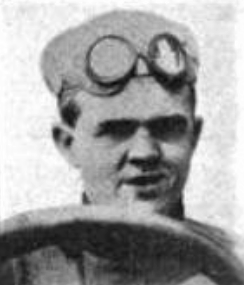
- Born: Charles Cleveland Merz; July 6, 1888 Indianapolis, Indiana, U.S.
- Died: July 8, 1952 (aged 64) Indianapolis, Indiana, U.S.

Champ Car career
- 18 races run over 6 years
- First race: 1909 Prest-O-Lite Trophy (Indianapolis)
- Last race: 1916 International Sweepstakes (Sharonville)
- First win: 1911 St. Francis Hotel Trophy (Portola)
- Last win: 1912 Illinois Trophy (Elgin)
Wins	Podiums	Poles
3	10	0

Charles Cleveland Merz (July 6, 1888 – July 8, 1952) was an American racing driver, military officer, engineering entrepreneur, and racing official. Active in the early years of the Indianapolis 500, he later became Chief Steward of the Memorial Day Classic.

== Early years ==
At just 17, Merz demonstrated impressive skill as a race driver when he was hired by Arthur C. Newby (one of the future founders of the Indianapolis Motor Speedway) to drive one of his National Motor Vehicle Company stock cars against some of the top competitors in the United States at a 100-mile (160 km) race at the Indiana State Fairgrounds one-mile (1.6 km) dirt oval on November 4, 1905. Merz led the race over his teammate W. F. "Jap" Clemens until lap 80 when his right rear tire blew and sent him crashing through a wooden fence.

After observing the event, Carl G. Fisher, who later founded the Indianapolis Motor Speedway, saw the opportunity to promote American automobiles by staging a 24-hour distance record run. Working with Newby and James A. Allison, his partner at Prest-O-Lite, the trio organized the record run again at the Indiana State Fairgrounds for November 17–18. Two Nationals, again driven by Merz and Clemens, began the run, this time with Clemens setting the early pace. Clemens' car blew a tire on mile 152, crashing through the wooden fence. As with Merz on November 4, he was unscathed. As night fell, Prest-O-Lite lamps provided by Allison and Fisher illuminated the track.

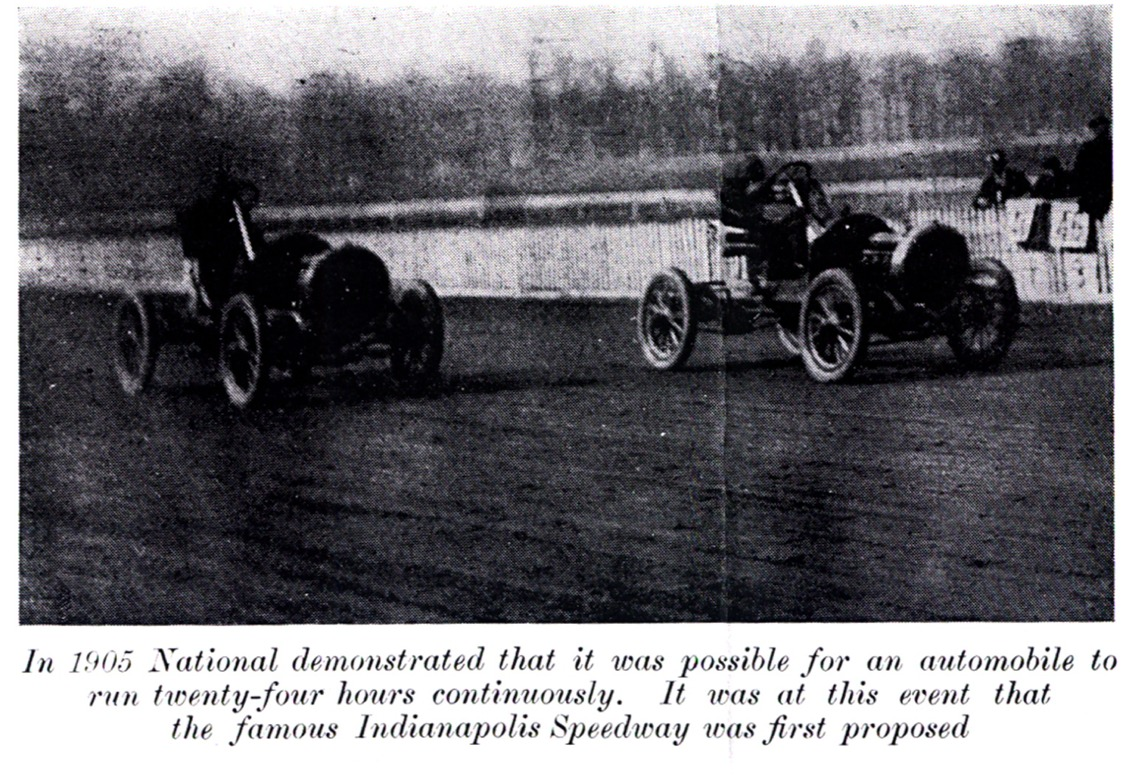
Merz and Clemens racing National stock cars at the Indiana State Fairgrounds one-mile dirt oval, November 17, 1905

The men struggled through the night, rarely driving longer than 30 minute stints. The cold, exacerbated by their exposure in open cockpit cars, was debilitating. Goggles were useless because they frosted over within minutes. Stiff with cold and bloodshot eyes, both Clemens and Merz warmed themselves with a bonfire and hot coffee when they stopped. In the end, at 2:45 p.m. on November 18, 1905, Merz and his teammate set a new world record for distance covered in 24 hours at 1,094.19 miles (1,760.93 km).

Merz loved motorized competition. In addition to competing in automobile races, he also rode motorcycles and was entered in the Indianapolis Motor Speedway's first motorcycle meet in 1909.

== Vanderbilt Cup ==
Merz competed in one Vanderbilt Cup race, the first major race in the United States on October 30, 1909. Again, the 21-year-old was at the wheel of a National stock car. He ran well in the early going, working his way into third by the halfway point. A bent crankshaft ended his day on lap 12 of the 22-lap race. He finished the Vanderbilt Cup in seventh position.

== Indianapolis Motor Speedway ==
Merz not only raced in the Indianapolis 500 four times, but also competed in the races held at the Indianapolis Motor Speedway prior to the first running of the Indianapolis 500 in 1911.

=== Pre-Indianapolis 500 races at the Speedway ===
Merz did pick up one victory at the Indianapolis Motor Speedway, the track's seventh auto race in August 1909. The race was a four-lap (10 miles) affair for stock chassis with engines of 301 to 450 cubic inch displacement. Only four cars started the race, with Jap Clemens retiring almost immediately. Merz, driving another National, won over Louis Chevrolet in a Buick. His victory was met with applause from local fans as both driver and car were from Indianapolis. He finished second and third in two other handicap events as well.

More significant, perhaps, were two other races Merz competed in during the same 1909 race meet. They were the longest races of the 1909 race meet, the 250-mile (400 km) Prest-O-Lite Trophy and the 300-mile (480 km) Wheeler-Schebler Trophy.

The Prest-O-Lite race yielded a third-place finish for Merz behind winner Bob Burman in a Buick. The race also produced the first fatalities at the Indianapolis Motor Speedway when 30-year-old driver William Bourque and his 23-year-old riding mechanic Harry Holcomb struck a fence post. The incident destroyed their Knox and killed both men.

Merz was directly involved with another fatal accident when, at 175 miles (282 km), the right front tire on his National blew out and sent him through the track's outer fence and into a cluster of spectators. Merz was lucky to escape injury as his riding mechanic, Claude Kellum was killed. Two spectators died in the incident and several more sustained minor injuries.

Following these deaths, the Indianapolis Motor Speedway, initially using a crushed stone surface, was paved with brick to produce a safer track. The first full race meet for the new "Brickyard," came in May 1910. Merz competed in seven events in that race meet. The most noteworthy was his second-place drive for National in the 100-mile (160 km) Prest-O-Lite Trophy.

At the Speedway's July 1910 meet, Merz drove for Empire, a short-lived Indianapolis automobile company founded by Carl G. Fisher. He drove in two minor sprint races, with a best finish of second. In September 1910 Merz was back with National and ran in nine races. All but one, the Remy Grand Brassard 100-mile (160 km) race, were sprint contests of five to 10 miles (16 km). In the Remy Grand Brassard race, Merz battled teammate and future Indy 500 winner, Howdy Wilcox, to the finish only to lose by nine seconds. Wilcox won and Merz was second.

=== Indianapolis 500 highlights ===
Merz finished the Indianapolis 500 in the top 10 in three of his four starts. He was seventh in the first "500" in 1911, again driving for National. In 1912 he changed to the Stutz team, impressing observers with his ability to keep a car with the second smallest engine (390 cubic inches) in contention. The Horseless Age praised his driving skill through the Speedway's banked turns, noting that it was in the turns that he picked up time on his competitors. Merz finished fourth.

Merz's best finish was third in 1913. It also proved to be his most spectacular. Merz, driving a Stutz again, was chasing Spencer Wishart in a New Jersey-built Mercer for second place when his engine burst into flames just before starting the last of the race's 200 laps. Instead of stopping, Merz pushed on, gambling he could finish one more lap. Coming down the front stretch to the checkered flag, spectators saw Merz's mechanic, Harry Martin, leaning out of the cockpit trying to bat the flames down with a jacket.

Merz did not race at Indianapolis in 1914 or 1915, but returned in 1916 for his final attempt to win the "500." A loss of oil pressure in his Peugeot engine ended his day early, leaving him in 19th place.

== Later career ==
Merz took up the position of engineer for Rayfield Carburetter Company in 1914, and served in France during the First World War in the American Expeditionary Forces, the forerunner of the US Army Air Corps, from 1917 to 1919 reaching the rank of lieutenant-colonel. He joined Harry C. Stutz when Stutz set up his new business, H. C. S. Motor Car Company, in mid-1919. There, he held the position of assistant to the president until 1925, when he was appointed receiver for the company until it was liquidated in 1927.

In 1927, at age 39, Merz founded Merz Engineering and served as its president until his retirement in 1946. The company, under the leadership of Miklos Sperling, sponsored an Indy 500 team from 1950 to 1955. Merz served as Chief Steward for the Indianapolis 500, the top official of the race, from 1935 to 1939.

== Death ==
Merz died in his home just outside Indianapolis at age 64 on July 8, 1952. He is buried at Crown Hill Cemetery (Section 63, Lot 23) in Indianapolis.

== Motorsports career results ==
=== Indianapolis 500 results ===
Year	Car	Start	Qual	Rank	Finish	Laps	Led	Retired
1911	20	18	—	—	7	200	0	Running
1912	28	22	78.880	18	4	200	0	Running
1913	2	16	84.460	6	3	200	0	Running
1916	19	8	93.330	8	19	25	0	Lubrication
Totals						625	0	

Starts	4
Poles	0
Front Row	0
Wins	0
Top 5	2
Top 10	3
Retired	1
