= Teddy Tetzlaff =

American racing driver (1883–1929)

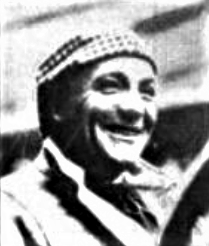
- Born: Theodore Herbert Tetzlaff; February 5, 1883 Orange, California, U.S.
- Died: December 8, 1929 (aged 46) Artesia, California, U.S.

Champ Car career
- 20 races run over 6 years
- First race: 1909 Dick Ferris Trophy (Santa Monica)
- Last race: 1915 San Francisco 100 (Panama–Pacific)
- First win: 1912 Dick Ferris Trophy (Santa Monica)
- Last win: 1912 Montamarathon Trophy (Tacoma)
Wins	Podiums	Poles
3	4	0

Theodore Herbert Tetzlaff (February 5, 1883 – December 8, 1929) was an American racing driver active in the formative years of auto racing. He competed in the first four Indianapolis 500s, with a highest finish of second in 1912. He earned the nickname "Terrible Teddy" due to his rough treatment of his vehicles. His wide-open throttle racing style would variously win a race, blow up his engine or cause him to crash. As auto racing strategies evolved from the early "go as fast as you can and see if you can stay on the track," Tetzlaff's success in the sport waned.

== Biography ==
Tetzlaff was born in Orange, California, on February 5, 1883.

== Speed records ==
On March 19, 1911, as Lozier ads claimed, a stock 49-horsepower (37 kW) model piloted by Tetzlaff set a world record for 100 miles (160 km) at 1:14:29.

In 1914, the Moross Amusement Company of Ernest Moross engaged Tetzlaff to campaign the 300-horsepower (220 kW) Benz, naming it "Blitzen Benz 2." He broke the world land speed record mark by running 142.85 miles per hour (229.89 km/h) on the Bonneville Salt Flats at Salduro, Utah, on August 12.

== Motion pictures ==
Around 1912, Tetzlaff began appearing as himself in several silent motion pictures produced by comedy pioneer Mack Sennett. He even appeared in one Sennett film The Speed Kings (1913) alongside fellow racing driver Barney Oldfield. He later became an assistant to actor Wallace Reid on Reid's car racing movies. His son Ted Tetzlaff was a noted Hollywood cinematographer.

== Death ==
Tetzlaff died in an assisted living facility in Artesia, California, on December 8, 1929. The Los Angeles Times reported that it was as a result of long-term effects of a spinal injury incurred during the 1911 Los Angeles to Phoenix race when his car hit a bump and overturned with Tetzlaff's head striking the ground. Having recovered quickly, he resumed his racing career and was later engaged in the auto service industry but had to retire as his health deteriorated.. Despite these claims, Tetzlaff's California Death Certificate lists the cause of death as paresis. He is buried at Fairhaven Memorial Park in Santa Ana, California.

== Filmography ==
Actor:

- 1913 The Speed Kings
- 1919 The Roaring Road
- 1920 Double Speed
- 1921 Too Much Speed
- 1922 Across the Continent
- 1929 The Fall of Eve

== Legacy ==
Tetzlaff Peak in Utah has borne his name since 1960. The mountain is located near Bonneville Salt Flats where he set the land speed record in 1914.

== Motorsports career results ==
=== Indianapolis 500 results ===
Year	Car	Start	Qual	Rank	Finish	Laps	Led	Retired
1911	34	30	—	—	39	20	0	Crash FS
1912	3	3	84.240	6	2	200	2	Running
1913	27	8	81.300	16	17	118	0	Drive chain
1914	8	2	96.360	3	28	33	0	Rocker arm
Totals						371	2	

Starts	4
Poles	0
Front Row	2
Wins	0
Top 5	1
Top 10	1
Retired	3
