= McFarlan Automobile =

Defunct American motor vehicle manufacturer

McFarlan Carriage Company McFarlan Motor Car Company
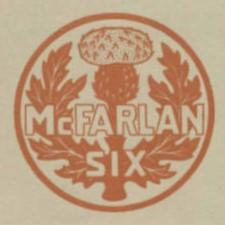
- McFarlan Six Logo from 1910 Brochure

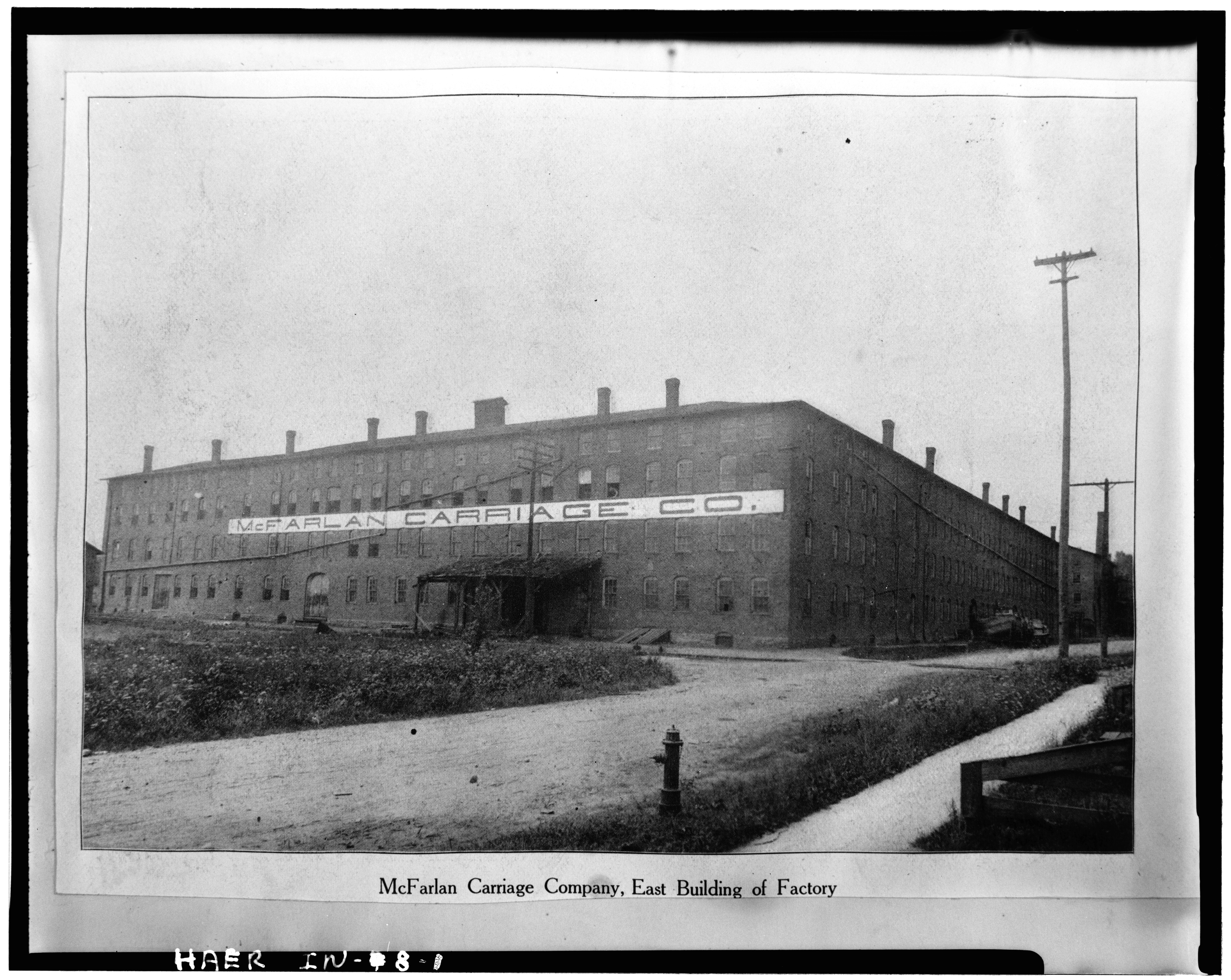
- 1911 McFarlan Factory
- Founded: 1856, 1910; 116 years ago
- Founder: John B. McFarlan, A. Harry McFarlan
- Defunct: 1928; 98 years ago
- Fate: Bankruptcy, factory sold to Auburn
- Headquarters: Connersville, Indiana, United States
- Key people: A. Harry McFarlan, Burton Barrows
- Products: Luxury Automobiles; Automotive parts, Coachbuilder
- Production output: 3,639 (1909-1928)

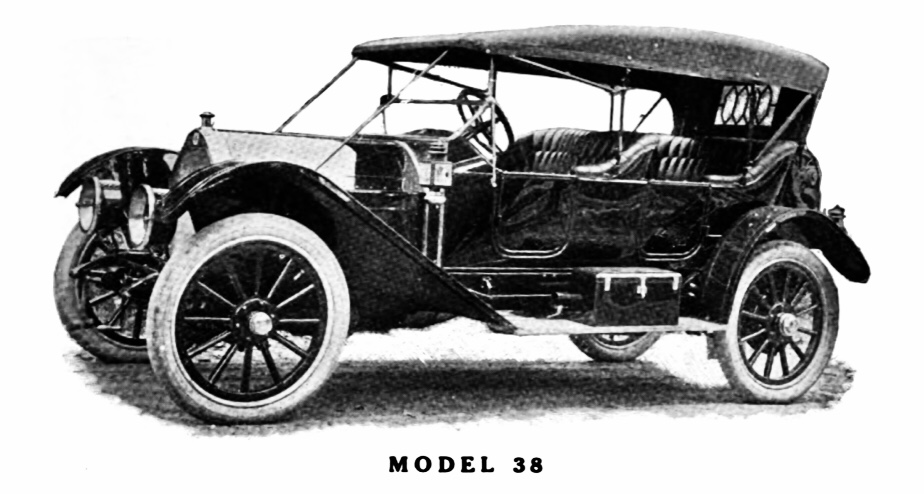
McFarlan Model 38 (1911–1912) 55/60 hp

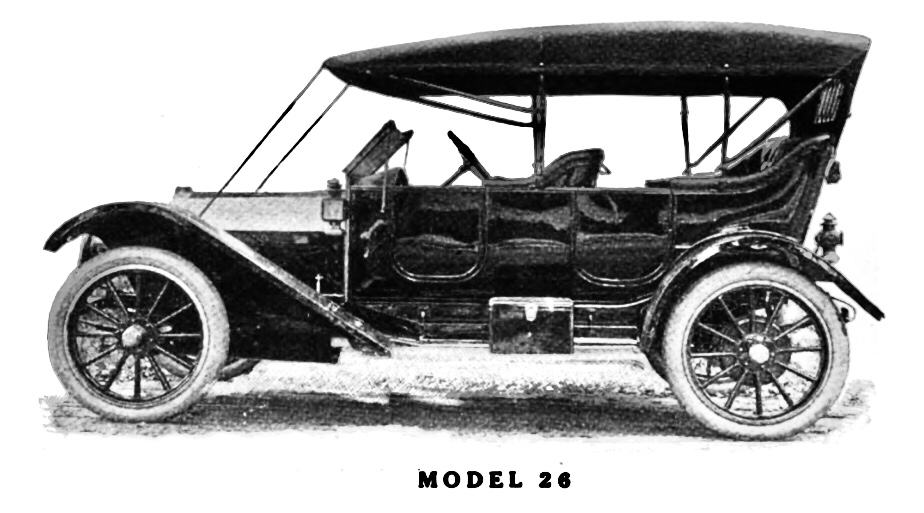
McFarlan Model 26 (1912) 40/45 hp

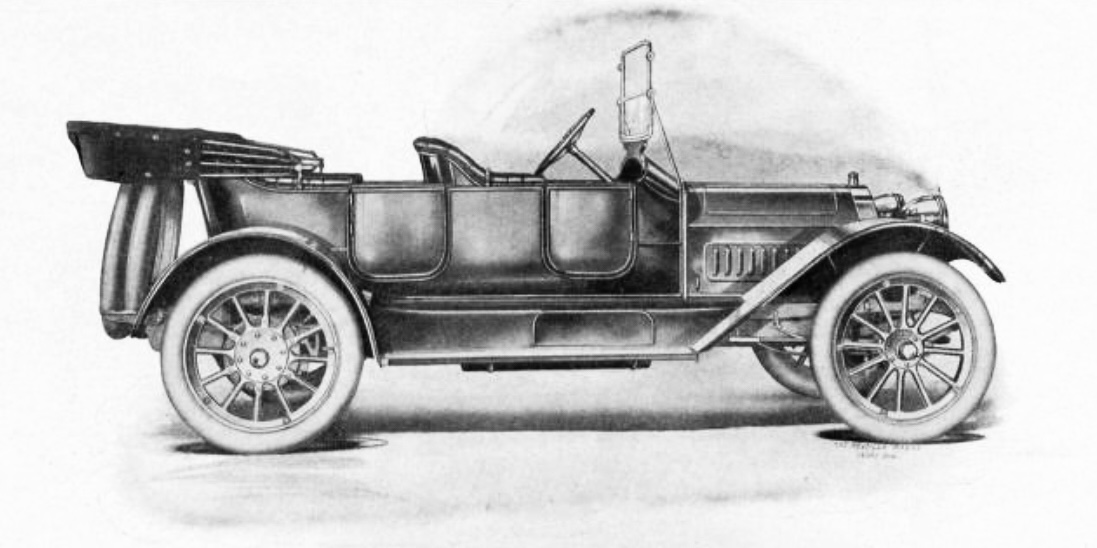
McFarlan Model 28 (1913)

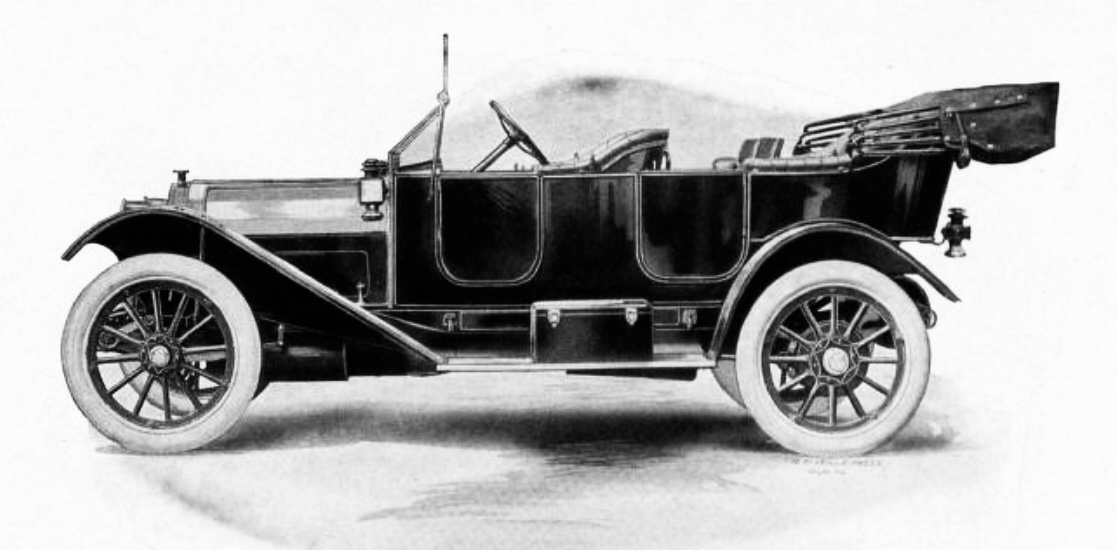
McFarlan Model 33M (1913)

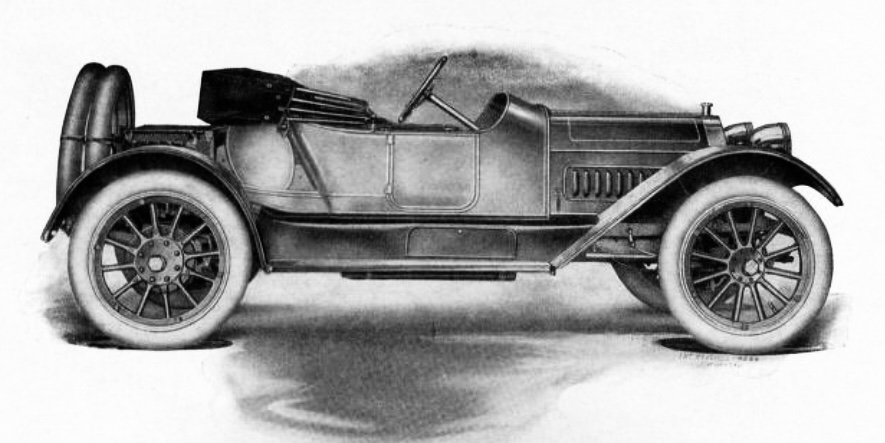
McFarlan Model 34 M (1913)

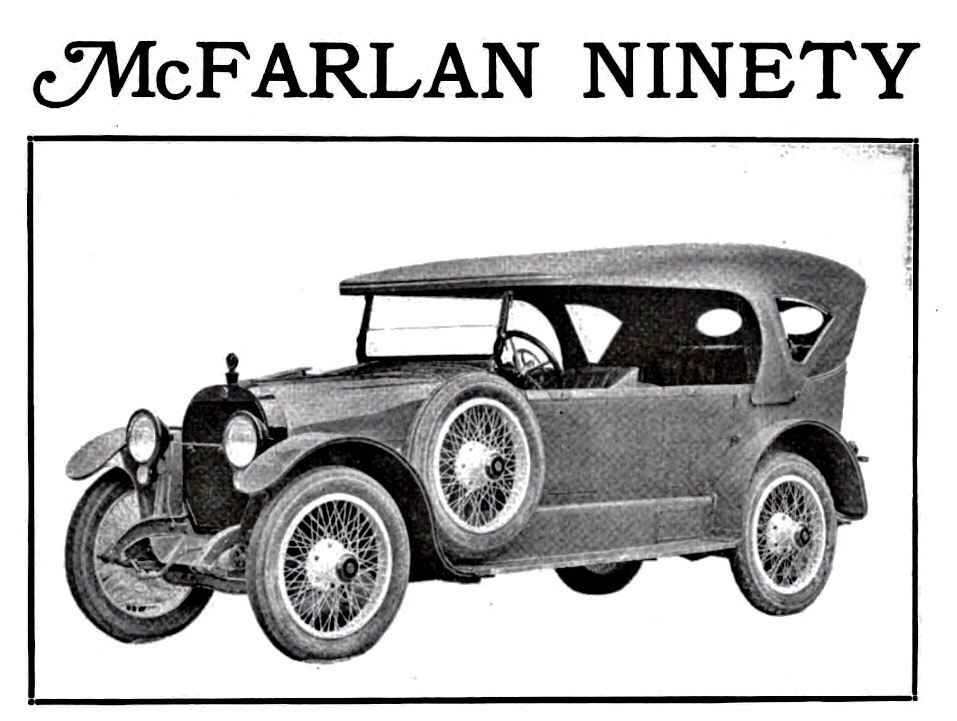
McFarlan Model 127 with 90 hp (1917–1920)

McFarlan was a luxury American automobile manufactured in Connersville, Indiana, from 1909 to 1928, by the McFarlan Carriage Company and the McFarlan Motor Car Company.

== History ==
McFarlan Carriage Company was founded in 1856 by English-born John B. McFarlan (1822–1909). J. B. McFarlan's grandson, Alfred Harry McFarlan (1881–1937) conceived the idea for the McFarlan motor car and ran the McFarlan Motor Car Company throughout its nineteen years.

John B. McFarlan is credited with creating one of the earliest planned industrial parks in the United States. During 1887 he formed the Connersville Industrial Park to bring manufacturers together from within the industry to have a purpose-build industrial site. This transformed into an automobile manufacturing center which supported more than seven automobile marques.

=== Carriages to motor cars ===
Harry McFarlan felt it was important to diversify the McFarlan carriage business. From introduction, the McFarlan motor car was a large, mid-to-high price automobile that was produced in small numbers (about 200 units annually) and always with an engine of six-cylinders. The McFarlan was introduced late in 1909. The first cars were road tested on a track that became the Indianapolis Motor Speedway.

In 1913 the McFarlan Motor Car Company superseded the McFarlan Carriage Company. Carriage production ended soon after.

A variety of proprietary engines (Wisconsin, Buda, Brownell, Continental) were used in the early McFarlans, with a Teetor-Hartley being settled on in 1916. The models were the Big Six and the Little Six offering two different price points to buyers.

In 1917 the McFarlan became more-upscale on a 136-inch wheelbase with the 48-hp Teetor-Hartley engine. Having begun as a $2,000 (equivalent to $71,667 in 2025) car in 1909, the McFarlan rose in price, until by 1920 some models reached $6,200, equivalent to $99,643 in 2025.

A 1919 McFarlan Type 125, a four-seater sport-touring car with the chassis number 19133, belonged to Wallace Reid, a Hollywood star who appeared in at least 180 movies.

== Overview of production figures ==
Year	Production	Model	Serial numbers	Engine displacement	HP
1910	100				
1911	100	38		6,178 cc	55/60
1912	150	38, 26		6,178 cc	40/45
1913	175	24S, 25S, 26S, 28S, 29S, 34S, 35S		6,178 cc	
	↑	21T, 24T, 25T, 26T, 27T, 28T, 29T, 34T, 35T		7,413 cc	
	↑	21M, 32M, 33M, 34M, 35M, 36M, 38M		7,819 cc	
1914	200	62, 70	4000 to 5000	9,383 cc	48,6
1915	200	77	7000 to 8000	9,383 cc	48,6
1916	200	104, 105, 106, 107	9000 to 10000	9,383 cc	48,6
1917	176	122, 124, 125, 126, 127	10001 to 11000	9,383 cc	48,6
1918	168	122, 124, 125, 126, 127	18000 to 19000	9,383 cc	48,6
1919	193	122, 124, 125, 126, 127	19001 to 20000	9,383 cc	48,6
1920	207	122, 124, 125, 126, 127	20001 to 21000	9,383 cc	48,6
1921	217	142, 145, 147, 151, 153, 154, 155, 156, 157, 158, 159, 161	21001 to 21500	9,383 cc	48,6
1922	235	Series TV	to	9,383 cc	SAE 48,6, 112 brake hp
1923	263	Series TV	21501 to	9,383 cc	48,6
1924	278		to	9,383 cc	48,6
1925	262		to	9,383 cc	48,6
1926	197	142, 145, 147, 151, 153, 154, 157, 158, 159, 160, 161, 163, 165, 166, 167, 175, 176, 177	23400 to 23700	9,383 cc	48,6
1927	143		to	9,383 cc	48,6
1928	175	142, 145, 147, 154, 159, 176, 178	24000 to	9,383 cc	48,6
	↑	842, 844, 845, 847, 854, 872, 874, 875, 879, 880, 886, 887	24000 to	4.894 cc	33,8
Sum	3639				

=== Racing and celebrity ===
In the first model year of 1910, two of the company's cars were entered in the Indianapolis Labor Day races at the Indianapolis Motor Speedway where both McFarlans finished in the top five. McFarlans driven by Mel Marquette were also entered in the first two Indianapolis 500 races (1911 and 1912) in which they finished 25th and 19th, respectively.

Aiming for the top of the luxury market, one McFarlan Town Car displayed at the 1923 Chicago Auto Show, had the nickel-plating replaced with 24 carat gold, including a gold-plated interior. It reportedly was sold for $25,000, equivalent to $472,412 in 2025. McFarlans were known as "the most expensive car made in the US" and "the American Rolls-Royce" during the 1920s, a tribute shared by the Cunningham, a similar-appearing luxury car built in Rochester, New York, whose history mirrors that of the McFarlan.

The McFarlan was a luxury automobile owned by celebrities of the day such as Wallace Reid, William Desmond Taylor, Fatty Arbuckle, Paul Whiteman, Jack Dempsey and Virginia governor E. Lee Trinkle. Al Capone bought a McFarlan for his wife, Mae, in 1924 and bought a second one in 1926.

=== Classic era ===
In 1921, McFarlan introduced an engine of its own design, the Twin-Valve Six (TV Six). The six-cylinder unit was actually an improved Teetor-Hartley engine with four-valves per cylinder, 18 spark plugs, pressure lubrication, triple ignition, displacing 573 cubic-inches and produced 120 horsepower. The TV Six had a 140-inch wheelbase chassis with McFarlan coachwork that would offer up to a total of 10 different models.

In an attempt to lower prices and increase sales, McFarlan introduced a mid-priced Single-Valve Six model powered by a Wisconsin six-cylinder engine. The Single-Valve Six Model occupied a very competitive segment of the industry, and the McFarlan did not fare well, prompting the company to discontinue the model during 1926.

By 1925 the McFarlan Motor Car Company offered 2 distinct lines with a total of 26 different models ranging in price from $2,000 to $10,000. On a limited basis, McFarlan built commercial cars; ambulances, hearse, funeral cars and firetrucks usually powered with a Continental engine.

McFarlan coachwork for other manufacturers were an important part of the McFarlan Motor Company's business. The custom boat-tail speedster design by McFarlan was adopted for Duesenbergs and Auburns. McFarlan and its neighbor, the Central Manufacturing Company supplied the speedster bodies that appeared on the 1928 Auburn.

McFarlan attempted again to capture a share of the growing mid-market with the 1926 introduction of a straight-eight. The Line-8 was on a shorter 131-inch wheelbase and came equipped with a 79-horsepower Lycoming engine. It sold better than the Single-Valve model.

The 1927 McFarlan lineup included the Line-8 and the Twin-Valve Six offered in a variety of body styles. The Line-8 prices ranged from $2,650 to $4,600, equivalent to $85,259 in 2025. The Twin-Valve Six prices were among the most expensive on the market, ranging from $5,400 to $9,000, equivalent to $166,810 in 2025.

=== Fate ===
The 1920s witnessed the failing health of Harry McFarlan, the post-World War I recession, and new products being introduced by other manufacturers. Harry McFarlan's long time associate Burton Barrows took over company operations, and introduced the Line-8 and new styling for Twin-Valve Six, but his health also failed and he died in 1928. McFarlan's efforts to move into new market segments had thinned its resources, and when the company did introduce new styling in 1928 (the first since 1921), it was too late. 1928 became the final model year and on August 8, 1928, bankruptcy was declared. One year later on August 1, 1929, the factory was sold to the Auburn Automobile Company. The Auburn Company used the factory for storage space for its unfinished automobiles, and it would later serve as a body shop for the Auburn.

In 1967 a book, What Was the McFarlan? was privately published by authors Keith Marvin and Al Arnheim. It is considered the definitive history of the McFarlan Motor Car Company. The authors were McFarlan enthusiasts and avid automobile historians, and the book identified nineteen extant McFarlans.

McFarlans are owned in private collections and automobile museums, including the Indianapolis Motor Speedway Hall of Fame Museum, the Petersen Automotive Museum in Los Angeles, the National Automobile Museum in Reno, Nevada, Historic Connersville in Connersville, Indiana and the Nethercutt Collection in California.

== Gallery ==
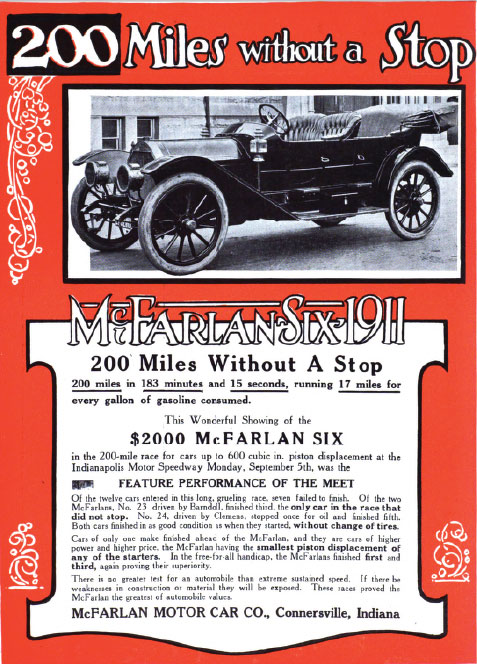
1911 McFarlan Six Advertisement

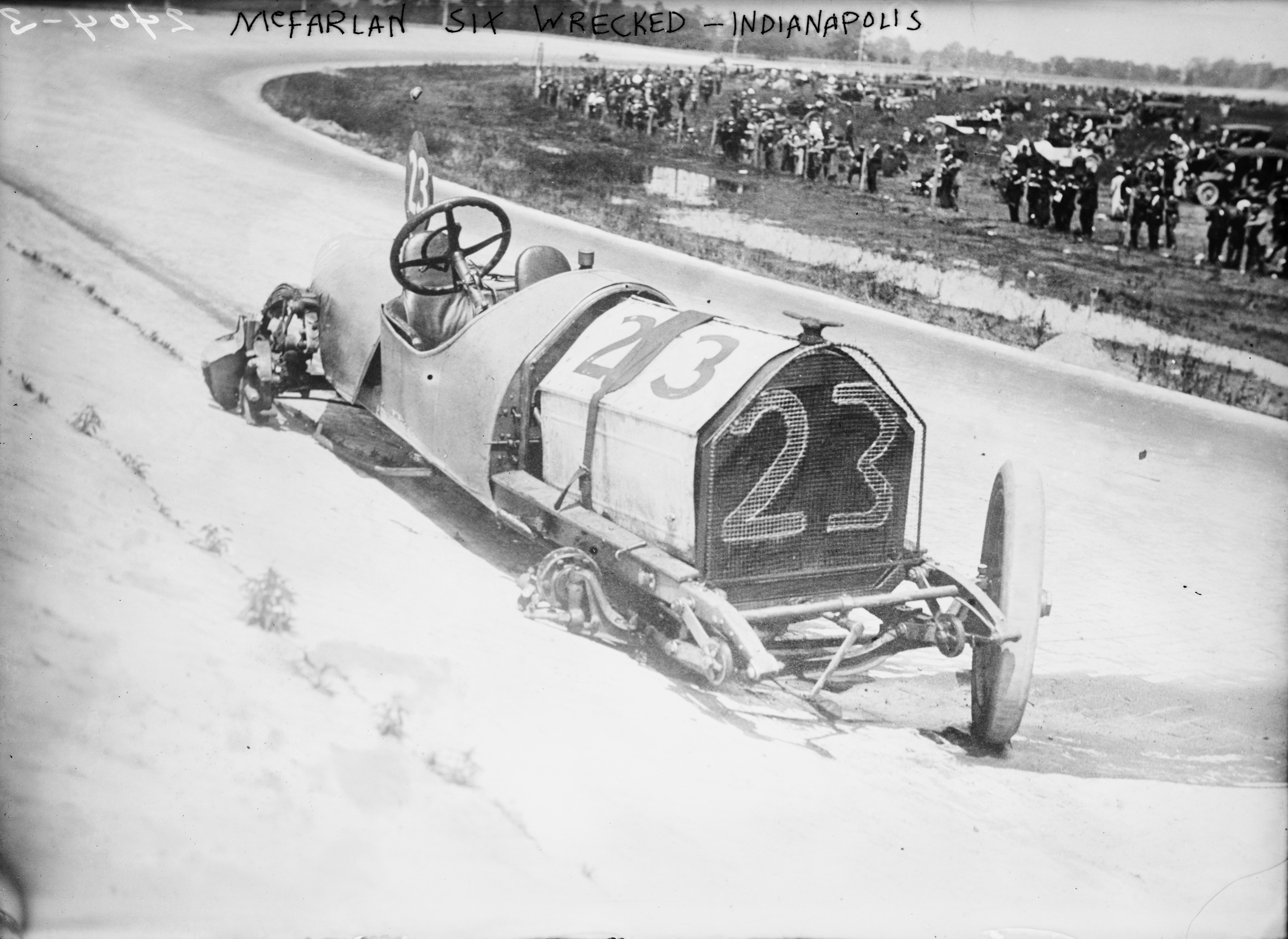
Driver Mel Marquette's wrecked McFarlan racing car at the 1912 Indianapolis 500

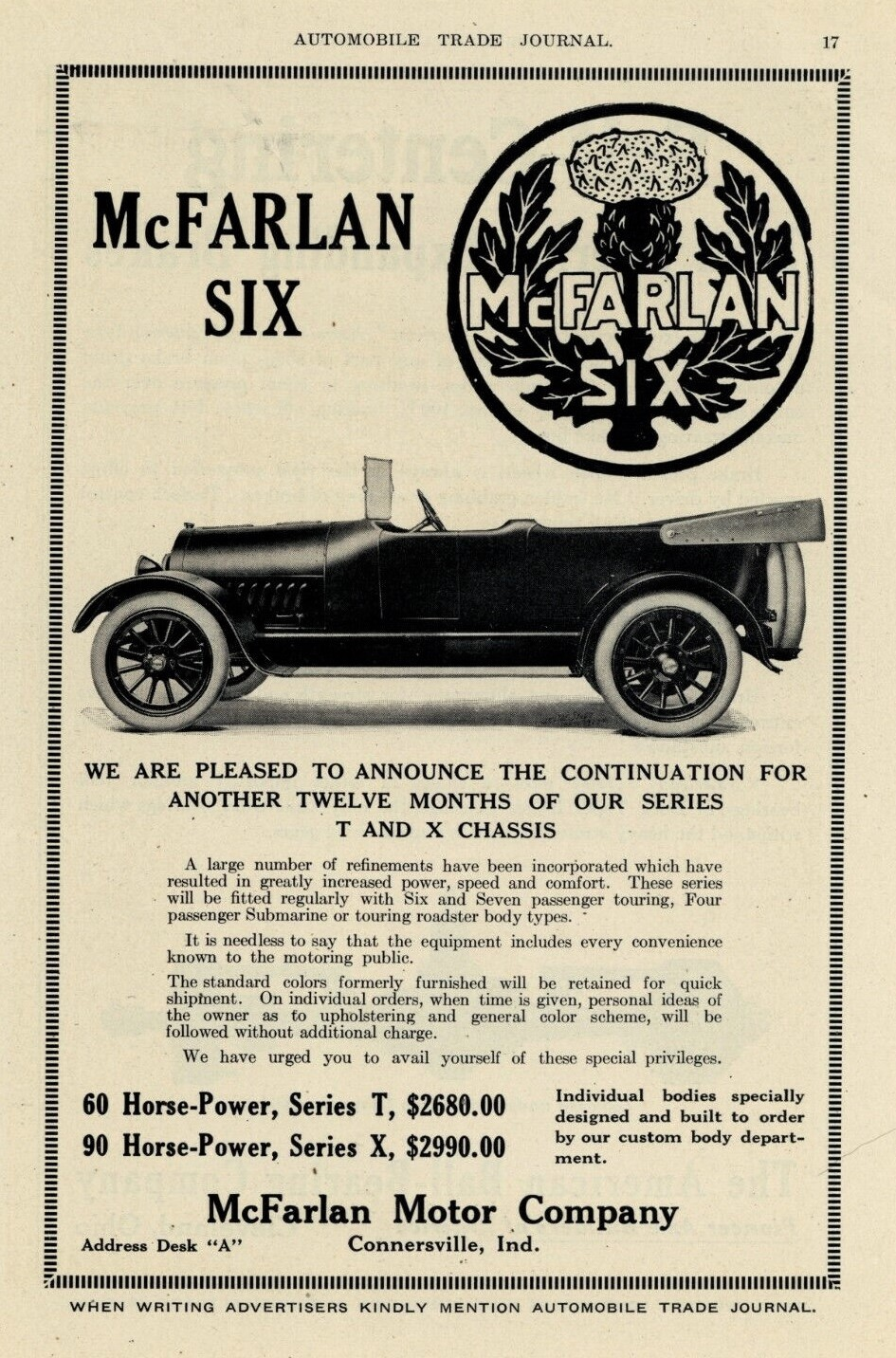
1915 McFarlan Six Advertisement

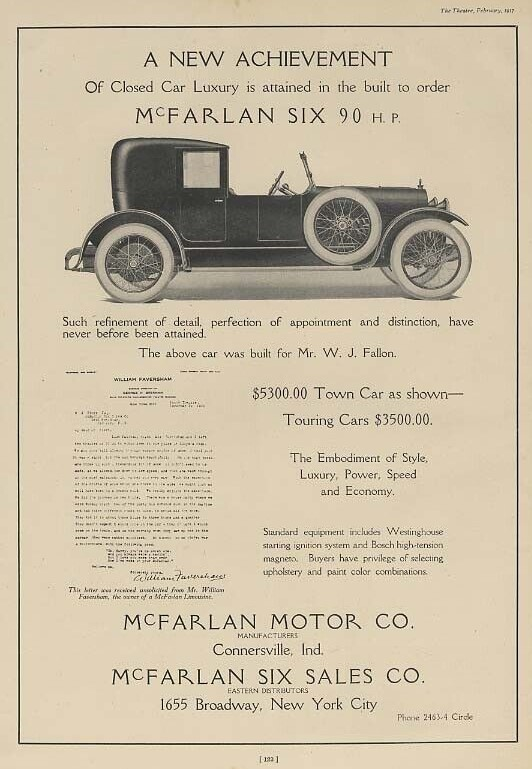
1917 McFarlan Six - Closed Car Luxury

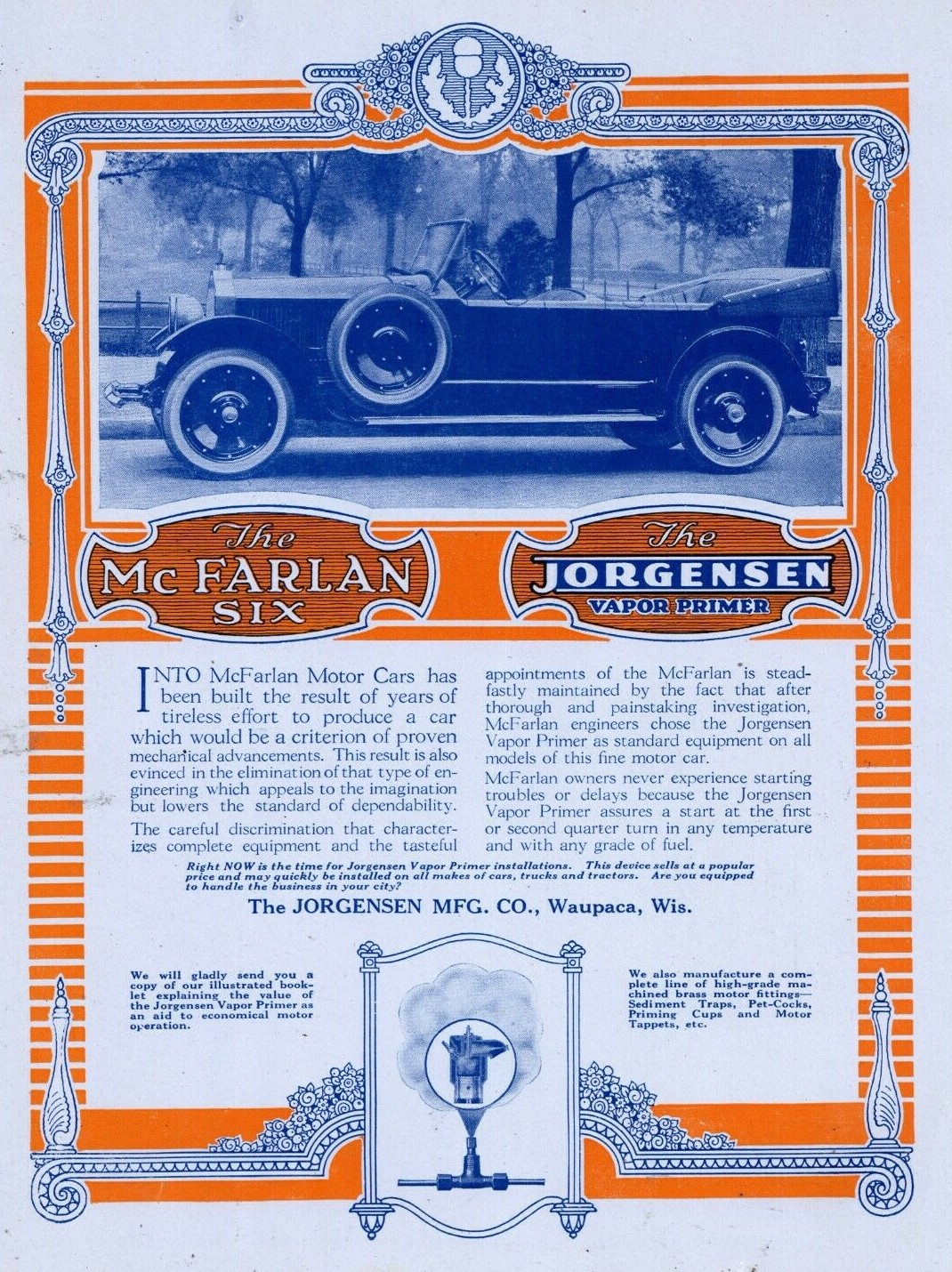
1921 McFarlan Six and Jorgensen Vapor Primer Advertisement

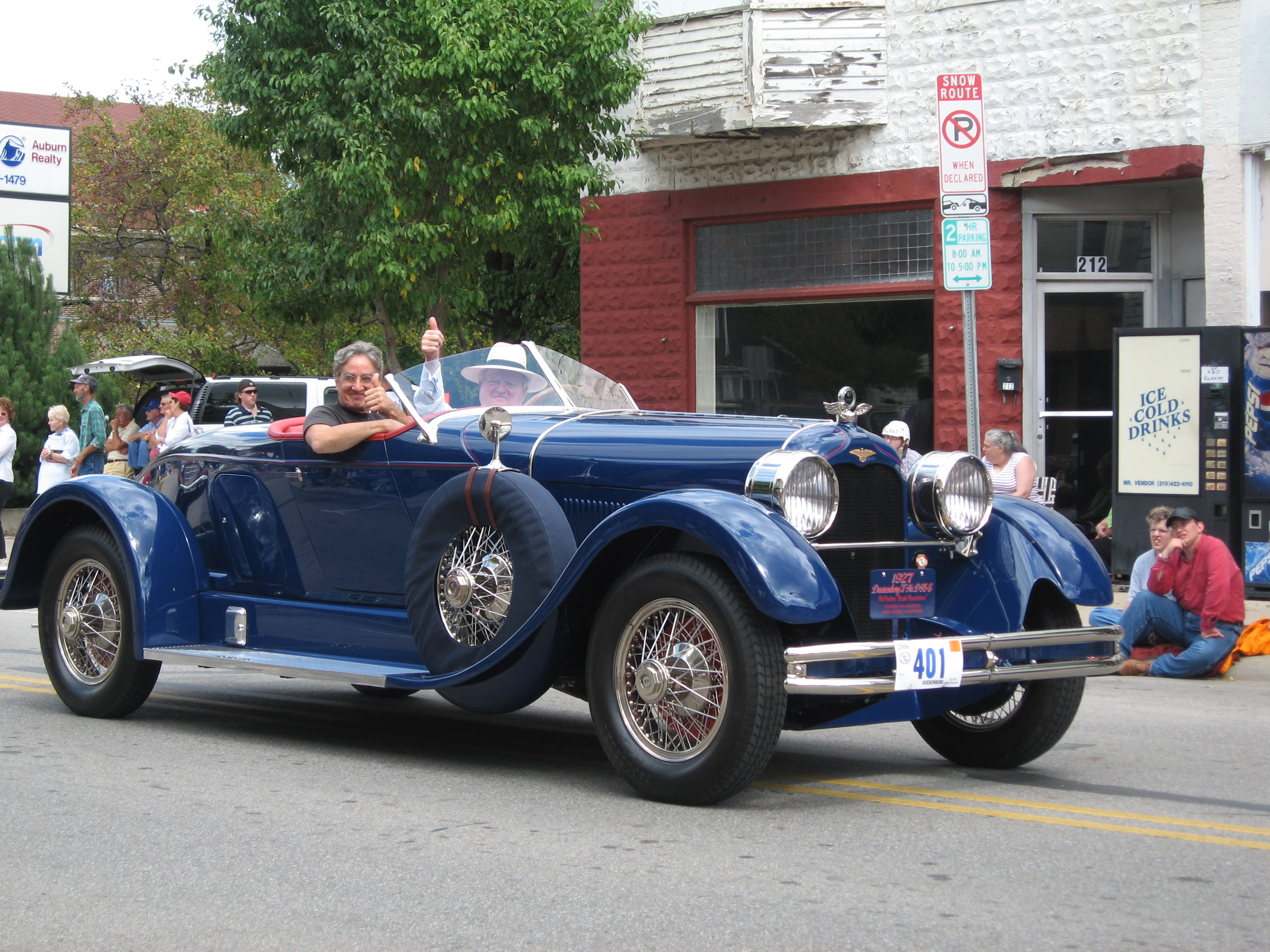
1927 Duesenberg Model X Boattail Roadster, with McFarlan coachwork

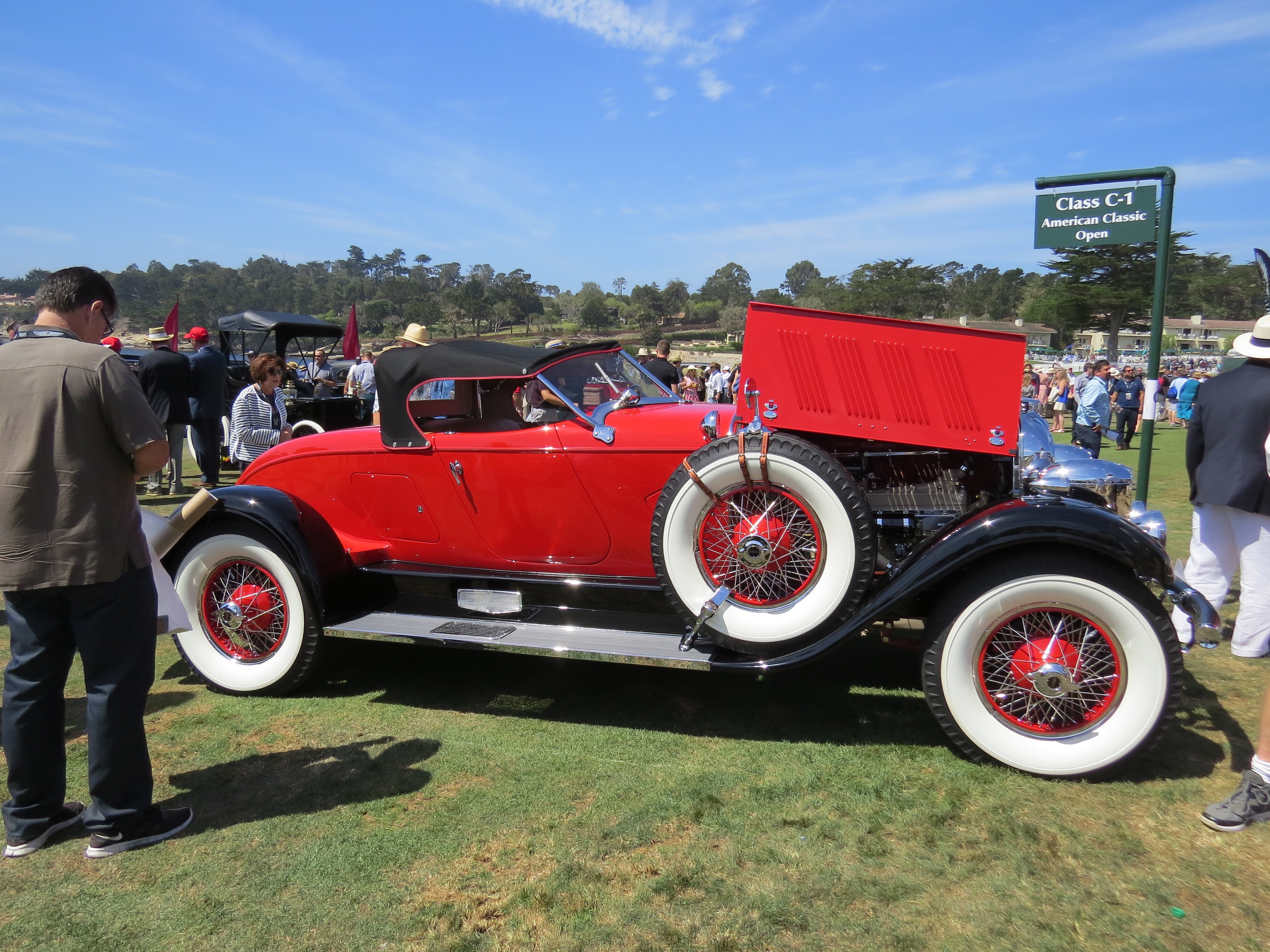
1928 Auburn 8-115 McFarlan speedster, with McFarlan coachwork

1926 McFarlan Twin Valve Six Phaeton (left)
