= The Speed Kings =

1913 film

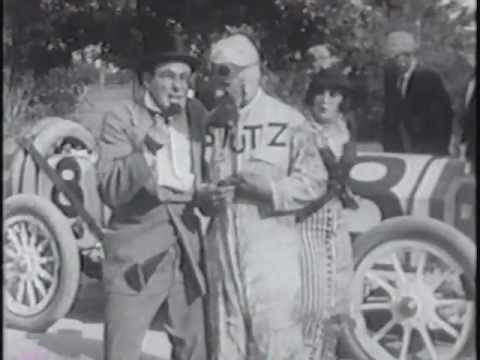
- Directed by: Wilfred Lucas
- Starring: Mabel Normand; Fatty Arbuckle
- Release date: October 30, 1913
- Running time: 8 minutes
- Country: United States
- Languages: Silent; English intertitles

The Speed Kings is a 1913 American short comedy film starring Mabel Normand and featuring Fatty Arbuckle in an early role. The film is set at a race track and features footage of actual races. The story has Mabel's papa trying to prevent her growing infatuation with real life racing driver Teddy Tetzlaff. The Speed Kings survives.

== Cast ==
- Ford Sterling as Papa
- Mabel Normand as Mabel
- Teddy Tetzlaff as Himself, a race car driver
- Earl Cooper as Himself, a race car driver
- Roscoe "Fatty" Arbuckle as Race Track Official
- Billy Jacobs as (billed as Paul Jacobs)
- Barney Oldfield as Himself, a race car driver

== See also ==
- List of American films of 1913
- Roscoe Arbuckle filmography
