= Cutting (automobile) =

Make of automobile, 1909–1913

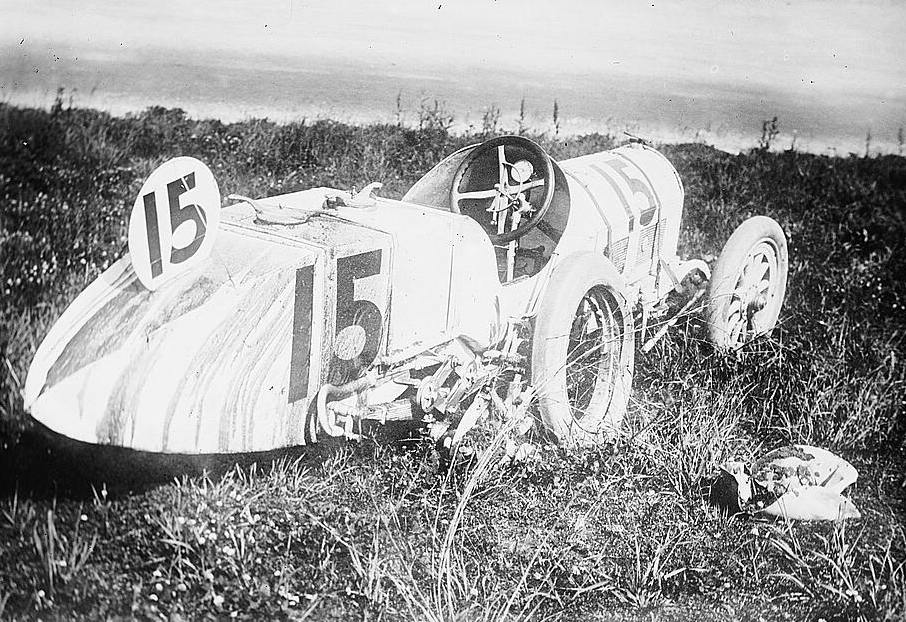
Bob Burman's Cutting after he crashed in the 1912 Indy 500

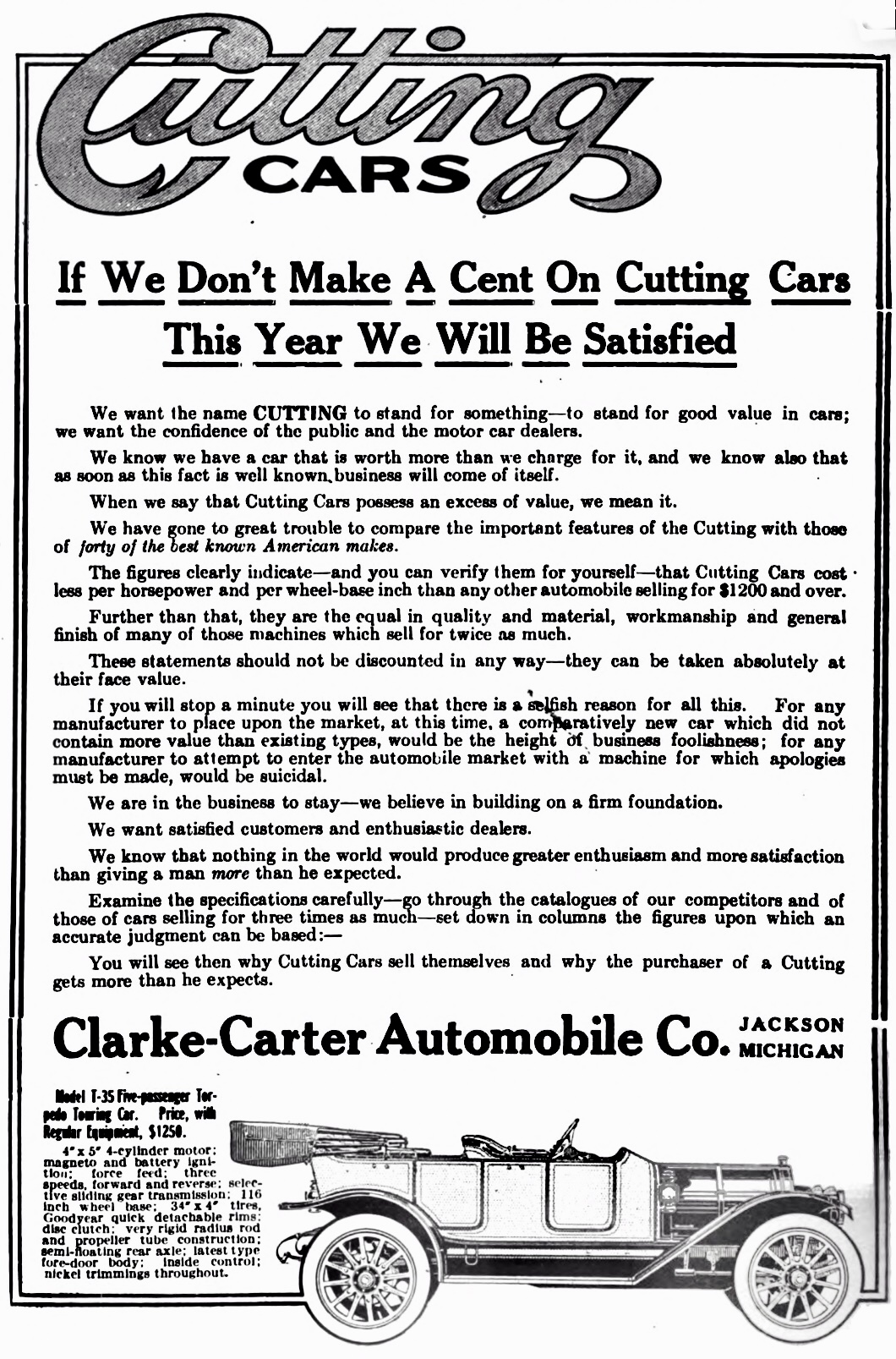
Cutting Model T-35 advertisement (1912)

The Cutting was an American automobile manufactured in Jackson, Michigan by the Clark-Carter Automobile Company from 1909 to 1912, and the Cutting Motor Car Company in 1913. It was made in the same factory as previously produced the C.V.I. make. The Cutting was engineered by Charles Cutting, using engines from Milwaukee, Model, and Wisconsin ranging from 30 to 60 hp. Prices ranged from US$1,200 to $1,500. In 1912 the company claimed to have the highest power-to-price ratio of any car at or above the $1,200 price.

Cuttings were entered into the Indianapolis 500 in 1911 and 1912, placing top 15 in the former year but crashing mid-race in the latter.

The company failed c. 1913 due to lack of sufficient initial capital; liabilities exceeded $350,000. It was sold in October 1913 for $30,000 (and assumption of two mortgages) to L. C. Erbes. Erbes manufactured the L.C.E. in Waterloo, Iowa from 1915 through 1916; models were a Touring, Roadster, and a "Gentleman's Speedster", which had a top speed of over 80 mph (130 km/h). The racer Bob Burman was involved with the company until his death in 1916. The death of Burman, combined with persistent material shortages, led Erbes to discontinue production after 1916, although he stayed in the automobile business dealing parts for "orphan" cars.
