= Fond du Lac County Fair =

Annual Fair

Coordinates: 43°45′53″N 88°25′45″W

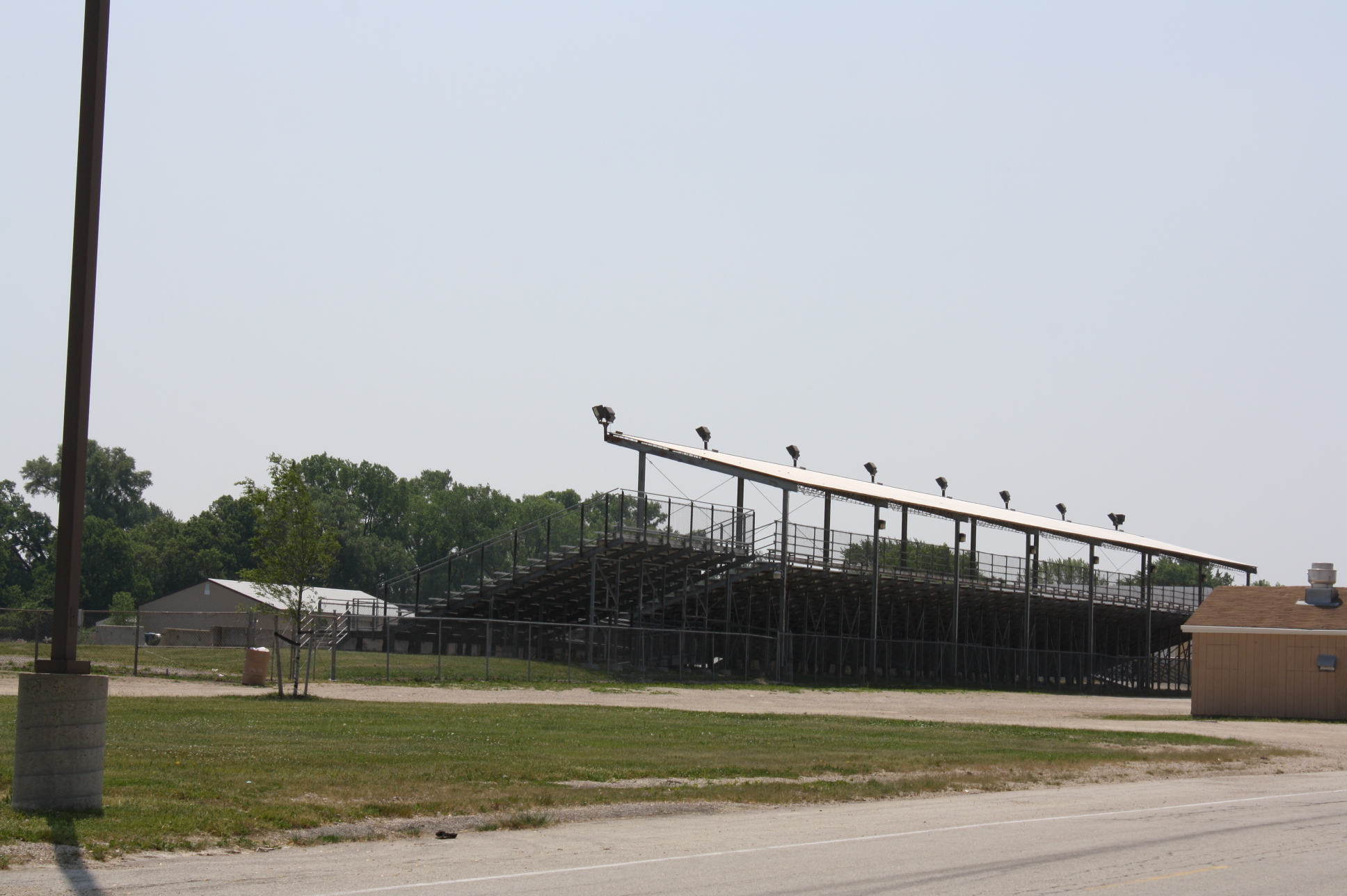
Grandstands at the fairgrounds

The Fond du Lac County Fair is an annual county fair that takes place every July in Fond du Lac, Wisconsin. The first Fond du Lac County Fair took place on September 29, 1852 in Rosendale. The Fond du Lac County Fairs' motto is "Education, Entertainment and Affordable Family Fun." Musical acts headlining the 2015 Grandstand include Grand Funk Railroad, (July 16, 2015) Great White & Slaughter, (July 17, 2015) Montgomery Gentry (July 18, 2015) and other family entertainment such as the Fondy Fair 5K Run/Walk on July 18, 2015. Other Grandstand shows include a tractor pull, horse pull, truck pull, BMX stunt show and a demolition derby.

The only cancelled years were 1917–18 and 1942–45. In 2020, officials had to limit attendance and cancel concerts and rides due to the COVID-19 pandemic.

The Fond du Lac County Fairgrounds was used as an automobile racing facility in the early 20th century. Past winners include Bill Endicott in 1912.

== Grandstand headliners ==
- 2025- Tracy Lawrence
- 2025- Dylan Scott
- 2025- Bret Michaels
- 2024- Scotty McCreery
- 2024- Pop Evil
- 2024- Vanilla Ice
- 2024- Fuel
- 2023- Randy Houser
- 2023- Tesla
- 2023- Skillet
- 2022- Switchfoot
- 2022- Seether
- 2021- Daughtry
- 2021- Aaron Tippin, Sammy Kershaw, Collin Raye
- 2020- NONE
- 2019- The Guess Who
- 2019- Brett Young
- 2018- Skillet
- 2018- Jon Pardi
- 2017- Ted Nugent
- 2017- Martina McBride
- 2016- Hairball
- 2015- Montgomery Gentry
- 2015- Slaughter
- 2015- Great White
- 2015- Grand Funk Railroad
- 2014- Collective Soul
- 2014- Jerrod Niemann
- 2013- Whitesnake
- 2013- Hinder
- 2012- Foreigner
- 2012- Buckcherry
- 2012- Easton Corbin
- 2011- Theory of a Deadman
- 2011- Tesla
- 2011- Beach Boys
- 2010- Ted Nugent
- 2010- Billy Currington
- 2010- Neal McCoy
- 2010- Skid Row
- 2010- 38 Special
- 2009- The Guess Who
- 2009- Phil Vassar
- 2008- Joan Jett & The Blackhearts
- 2008- REO Speedwagon
- 2008- Little Big Town
- 2008- Poisen
- 2008- Tesla
- 2008- George Thorogood & The Destroyers
- 2006- Alice Cooper
- 2005- The Beach Boys
- 2005- Cheap Trick
