= Mel Marquette =

American racing driver (1884–1961)

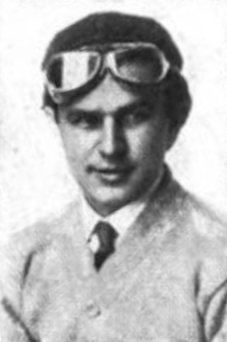
- Born: Melvon Andrew Marquette; September 22, 1884 Pyrmont, Indiana, U.S.
- Died: March 14, 1961 (aged 76) Findlay, Ohio, U.S.

Champ Car career
- 2 races run over 2 years
- First race: 1911 Indianapolis 500 (Indianapolis)
- Last race: 1912 Indianapolis 500 (Indianapolis)
Wins	Podiums	Poles
0	0	0

Melvon Andrew Marquette (September 22, 1884 – March 14, 1961) was an American racing driver. He was also an early aviator.

== Biography ==
Marquette was born near Pyrmont, Indiana on September 22, 1884. He graduated from Purdue University.

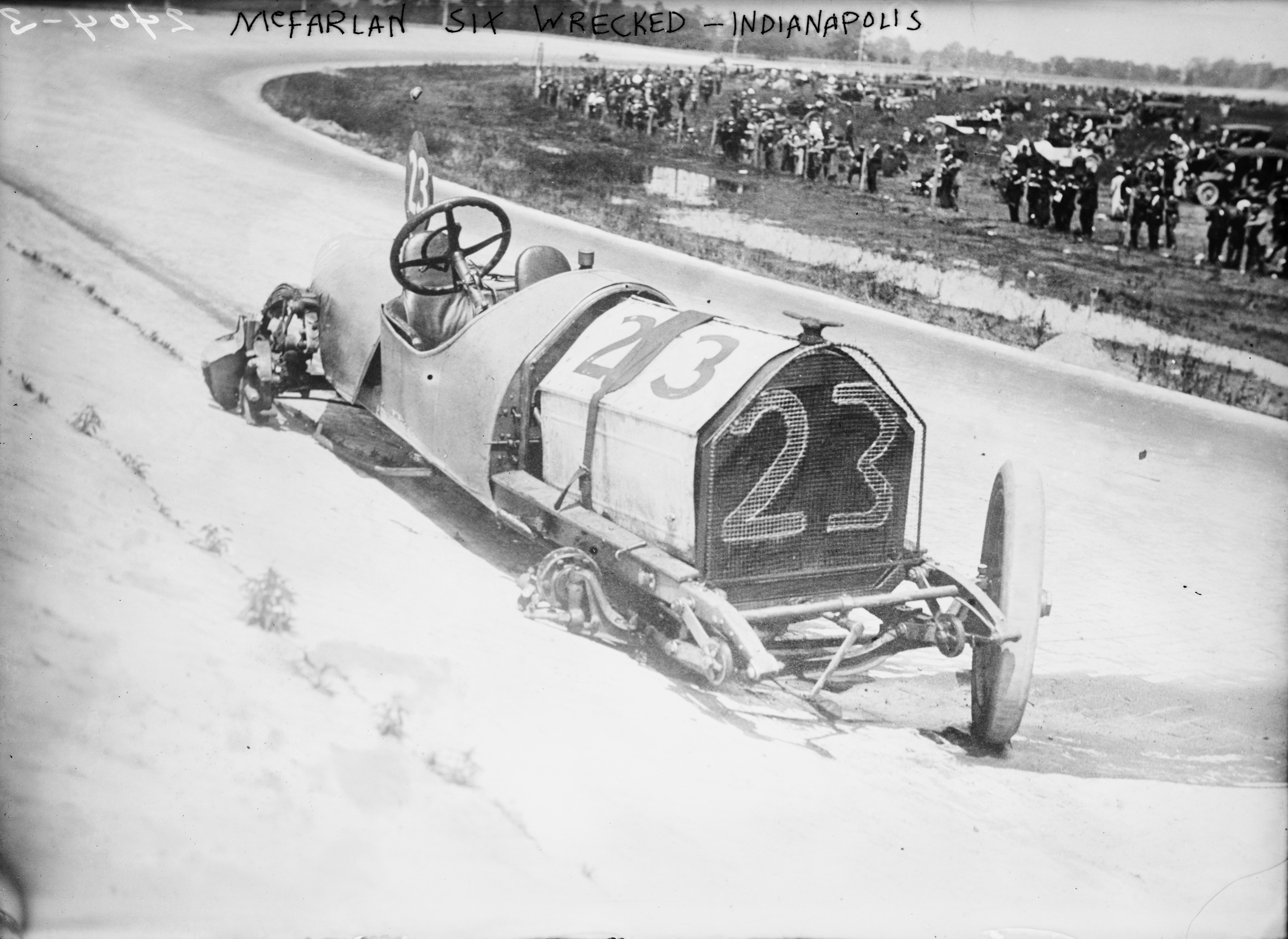
Marquette's wrecked McFarlan racing car at the 1912 Indianapolis 500

Marquette worked with the Wright brothers, and built and flew his own plane in 1910. He became the 13th licensed pilot in the United States.

In the 1930s, Marquette designed and built rubber plants in Belgium and Germany. He worked for Cooper Tire & Rubber Company after World War II.

Marquette died in Findlay, Ohio on March 14, 1961.

== Motorsports career results ==
=== Indianapolis 500 results ===
Year	Car	Start	Qual	Rank	Finish	Laps	Led	Retired
1911	23	20	—	—	25	126	0	Flagged
1912	23	19	78.080	20	19	63	0	Broken wheels
Totals						189	0	

Starts	2
Poles	0
Front Row	0
Wins	0
Top 5	0
Top 10	0
Retired	1
