= Bill Endicott =

American racing driver (1875–1944)

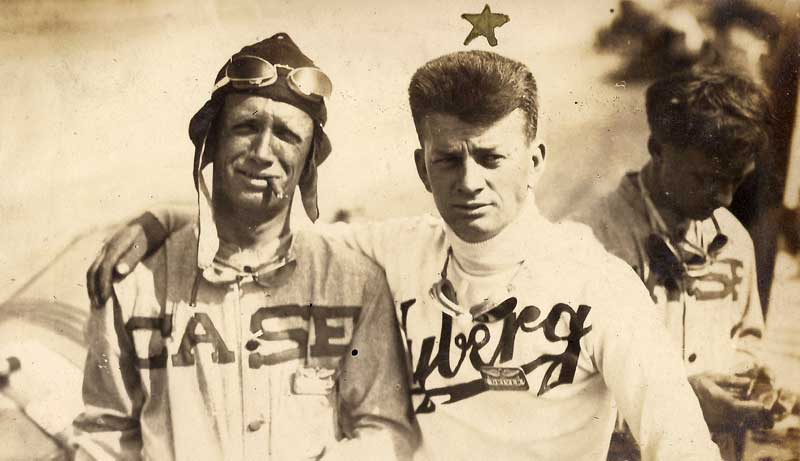
- Endicott (left), with brother Harry, circa 1913
- Born: Willard Nelson Endicott; November 5, 1875 Montgomery, Indiana, U.S.
- Died: June 7, 1944 (aged 68) Indianapolis, Indiana, U.S.

Champ Car career
- 10 races run over 4 years
- First race: 1910 60-mile Race (Atlanta)
- Last race: 1913 Elgin National Trophy (Elgin)
- First win: 1910 60-mile Race (Atlanta)
- Last win: 1910 Massapequa Sweepstakes (Long Island)
Wins	Podiums	Poles
2	3	0

Willard Nelson Endicott (November 5, 1875 – June 7, 1944) was an American racing driver. He raced in three Indianapolis 500 races in the 1910s. Endicott raced on several IMCA circuits in the United States and Canada in the 1910s and 1920s.

== Biography ==
Endicott was born on November 5, 1876, in Montgomery, Indiana. He was the older brother of Harry Endicott. He died on June 7, 1944, in Indianapolis, Indiana.

== Racing career ==
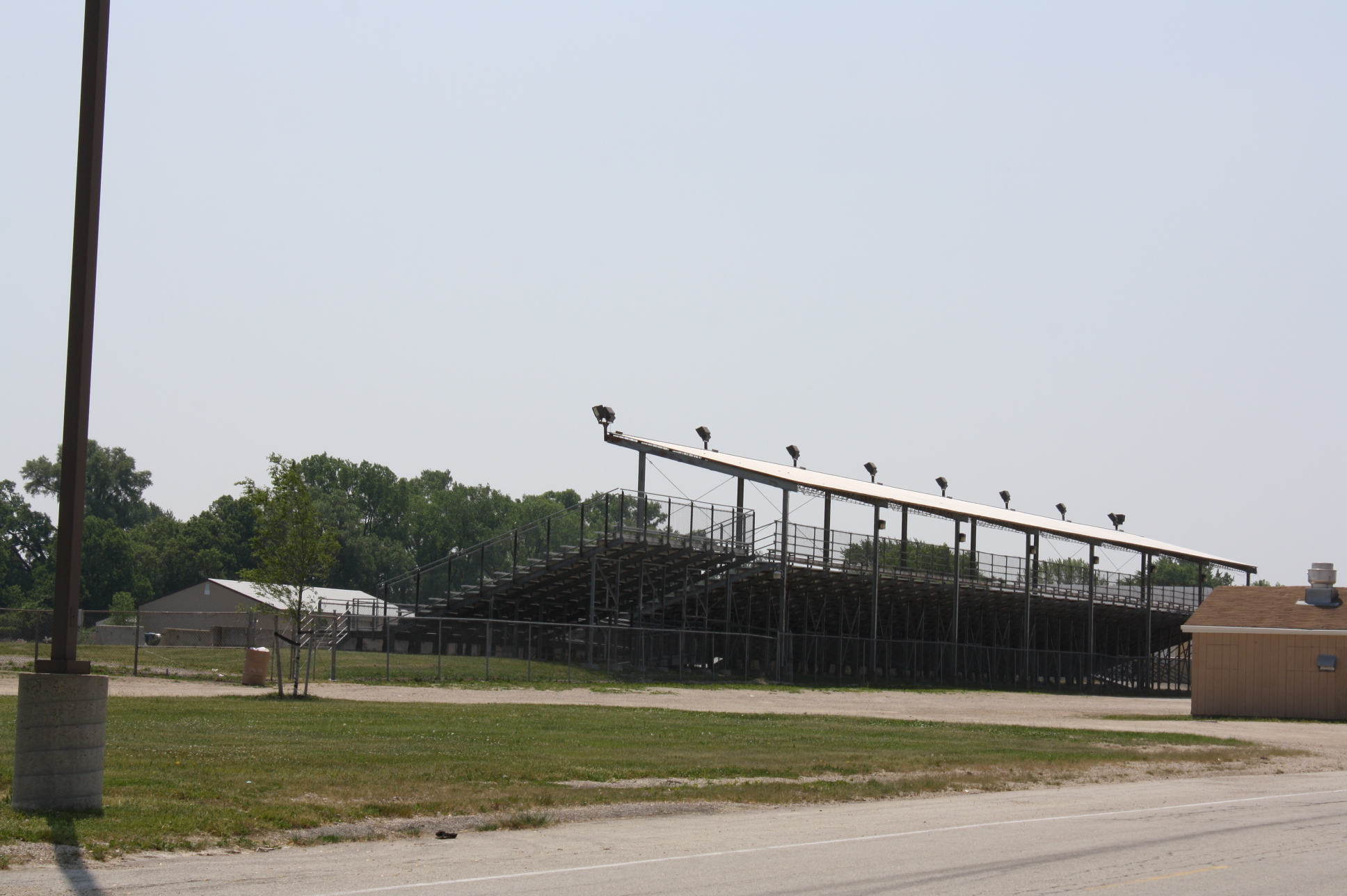
Fond du Lac (WI) Fairgrounds

Endicott was working as a farmer until his racing career began in 1902. He started 14 events in late 1909 to early 1910; he won ten of them and finished second in the other four. He won nine more races by the end of 1910. Endicott set a 24-hour endurance record at Brighton Beach Dirt Track by completing 936 miles (1,506 km) in 18 hours. He also set record times for 5, 10, 25, 75, and 100 miles at Beverly Hills Speedway. Endicott raced throughout the United States at dirt tracks with wins at Atlanta (GA), Louisville (KY), and Long Island (NY). In 1912, he finished fifth in the Indianapolis 500. Endicott also had dirt wins at Old Orchard (ME), Fond du Lac (WI), Milwaukee Mile, and Peoria (IL). He retired from racing after his brother Harry died in September 1913.

Endicott missed the adventure of racing and returned in 1915. He did a publicity stunt for Buick where he drove a Buick car at 1 mile per hour for the entire length of Capital Avenue to demonstrate that the automobile would ride smoothly at any speed. He won an early season American Automobile Association Contest Board race at Columbus, Ohio. Endicott raced the rest of the season on the International Motor Contest Association (IMCA) circuit. He took wins at Detroit (MI), two at Lincoln (NE), and Hutchinson (KS). In 1916, he won races at Zanesville (OH), Hutchinson, Ottawa (KS), Shreveport (LA), Detroit, Lincoln, and Helena (MT). In 1917, Endicott won races at El Dorado (KS), two at Salina (KS), Beatrice (NE), Hiawatha (KS), Ottawa (KS), Wichita (KS), and two at Fargo (ND). He had some wins in Canada in 1918: Calgary (AB), River Park (MB) as well as United States wins at Lincoln, Topeka, and Hutchinson. In 1919, he took Canadian wins at Edmonton (AB) and Weyburn (SK) and United States wins at Muskogee (OK), and Dallas (TX).

Endicott started the Roaring Twenties in the IMCA Eastern circuit with wins at Fitchburg (MA) and Medford (MA) in 1920. In 1921, he won at Fitchburg, Lewiston (ME), and North Adams (MA). His last full season happened in 1922 and he won at Huron (SD) and two times at Sioux City (IA).

== Life after racing ==
Endicott returned to farming after his racing career ended. He also worked as a traffic cop. For a short time, Endicott ran an automobile dealership selling Cole and Ford cars.

== Awards ==
Endicott was inducted into the National Sprint Car Hall of Fame on June 1, 2019, in Knoxville, Iowa. His award was accepted by his grandson, David Owens, of Marion, Indiana and his great-grandson, John Owens of Mebane, North Carolina.

== Motorsports career results ==
=== Indianapolis 500 results ===
Year	Car	Start	Qual	Rank	Finish	Laps	Led	Retired
1911	42	37	—	—	26	126	0	Flagged
1912	18	15	80.570	15	5	200	0	Running
1913	33	9	85.700	5	27	1	0	Drive shaft
Totals						327	0	

Starts	3
Poles	0
Front Row	0
Wins	0
Top 5	1
Top 10	1
Retired	1
