= CVI (automobile) =

Automobile from 1907 to 1908

The C.V.I. was an American automobile manufactured in Jackson, Michigan by the C.V.I. Motor Car Company from 1907 to 1908. The C.V.I. had a common chassis shared between the roadster and touring car models. The car had a four-cylinder, 4.2L engine, with a three-speed selective transmission and shaft drive. The cars sold for $4,000 (equivalent to $134,986 in 2024). Though the car performed well, several investors in the company decided to exit the car business, and the company was reorganized as the Clark-Carter Automobile Company.
