= Harry Knight (racing driver) =

American racing driver (1889–1913)

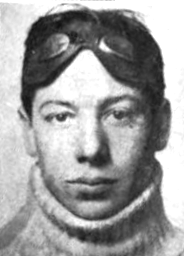
- Born: Harry C. Knight; August 6, 1889 Jonesboro, Indiana, U.S.
- Died: July 4, 1913 (aged 23) Columbus, Ohio, U.S.

Champ Car career
- 7 races run over 4 years
- First race: 1910 Indianapolis Race #6 (Indianapolis)
- Last race: 1913 Columbus 200 (Columbus)
Wins	Podiums	Poles
0	2	0

Harry C. Knight (August 6, 1889 – July 4, 1913) was an American racing driver. He competed in the first two Indianapolis 500 races as well as two "pre-500 era" races at the Indianapolis Motor Speedway in 1910, finishing second in a 100-mile race.

In the inaugural Indianapolis 500, Knight swerved out of the way to save another driver who had left the pits with a broken steering knuckle, wrecking his car. Knight was regarded by some newspapers as the "Hero of Indianapolis," and it was said that had he not wrecked, he could have won the race. He had not led the race when the accident occurred. Knight suffered a severe brain concussion and bruises. According to eyewitnesses, the first words he cried were, “I didn’t hit him, I didn’t hit him!”

Knight and his riding mechanic Milton Michaelis were killed while racing in a 200-mile Championship Car race at the Columbus Driving Park, a 1-mile dirt oval, in July 1913.

== Motorsports career results ==
=== Indianapolis 500 results ===
Year	Car	Start	Qual	Rank	Finish	Laps	Led	Retired
1911	7	7	—	—	30	90	0	Crash FS
1912	10	9	75.92	24	23	6	0	Engine trouble
Totals						96	0	

Starts	2
Poles	0
Front Row	0
Wins	0
Top 5	0
Top 10	0
Retired	2
