= Rayfield (automobile) =

Defunct American motor vehicle manufacturer

Rayfield Motor Car Company
- Formerly: Springfield Motor Car Company
- Industry: Automotive
- Founded: 1911; 115 years ago
- Founder: William Rayfield, John Rayfield
- Defunct: 1915; 111 years ago
- Fate: Bankruptcy
- Headquarters: Springfield, Illinois, Chrisman, Illinois, United States
- Key people: William Rayfield, John Rayfield, Hughie Hughes
- Products: Automobiles

The Rayfield was an American automobile marque manufactured from 1911 until 1915 by the Rayfield Motor Car Company, first in Springfield, Illinois and then in Chrisman, Illinois.

== History ==
The Rayfield name was well-known on carburetors invented by Charles Rayfield. His sons William (Bill) and John, began their automotive venture with the purchase of the Springfield Motor Car Company in 1910. Organized as the Rayfield Motor Car Company, Dashboard-radiatored 18-hp four-cylinder and 22-hp six-cylinder touring cars and roadsters were built in Springfield.

In 1912 the Rayfield brothers moved their company to a new factory in Chrisman, Illinois. Manufacturing was concentrated on the six-cylinder models. 218 cars were built in 1913.

A special-built Rayfield entered in the Indianapolis 500 of 1914 was to be driven by Hughie Hughes who also helped build it. It reached 95 mph during time trials, but mechanical problems eliminated it from participating in the race.

In 1914 the Rayfields added a cyclecar to their line, but it was really a light car as it had a standard 56-inch tread, a four-cylinder water-cooled engine, selective sliding gear transmission, rack-and-pinion steering and a steel body. The small car was priced at $375 (equivalent to $12,054 in 2025) and in 1915, 613 were made.

In 1915, the Rayfields contracted with the Great Western company of Peru, Indiana to build their light car. Great Western was in receivership and ultimately could not fulfill its contract. Bill Rayfield sued, but could not collect. The company had no cash to operate, and the Rayfield assets were sold at public auction in February 1916 for $14,000.

== See also ==
- Mike Mueller, (with John A. Conde, John W. Hobbs and Fred K. Thayer), Springfield and Rayfield automobiles: Background information, 1992
- Mike Mueller, "The Car That Didn't Make Chrisman Famous", Automotive Quarterly, 32:1, Fall 1993, pp 36 –51
- Rayfield Motors plagued with tragedy - Prairie Press
