= 1912 AAA Championship Car season =

Auto racing season

- AAA National Championship Trail

Season
- Races: 18
- Start date: May 4
- End date: November 5

Awards
- National champion: none declared
- Indianapolis 500 winner: (United States) Joe Dawson

The 1912 AAA Championship Car season consisted of 18 races, beginning in Santa Monica, California on May 4 and concluding in Brooklyn, New York on November 5. There was also one non-championship event at Milwaukee, Wisconsin. AAA did not award points towards a National Championship during the 1912 season, and did not declare a National Champion. Joe Dawson was the winner of the Indianapolis 500.

The de facto National Champion as polled by the American automobile journal Motor Age, was Ralph DePalma. Points were not awarded by the AAA Contest Board during the 1912 season. DePalma was named the champion by Chris G. Sinsabaugh, an editor at Motor Age, based upon merit and on track performance. A points table was created retroactively in 1927. At a later point, it was recognized by historians that these championship results should be considered unofficial.

== Schedule and results ==
Date	Race Name Distance (miles)	Track	Location	Type	Notes	Pole position	Winning driver
May 4	Chanslor & Lyon Trophy Race* (101)	Santa Monica Road Race Course	Santa Monica, California	8.417 mile road course	Stock chassis, 230 cu in.	Roscoe Anthony	George Joerimann
May 4	Jepsen Trophy Race* (152)	Santa Monica Road Race Course	Santa Monica, California	8.417 mile road course	231–300 cu in.	Earl Devore	Ralph DePalma
May 4	Dick Ferris Trophy Race* (303)	Santa Monica Road Race Course	Santa Monica, California	8.417 mile road course	Free-for-all	Dave Lewis	Teddy Tetzlaff
May 30	International 500 Mile Sweepstakes	Indianapolis Motor Speedway	Speedway, Indiana	2.5 mile brick oval	Qualifications based upon demonstrated 75 mph single-lap speed, 24-car field; Ralph DePalma pushes car across finish line	Gil Andersen	Joe Dawson
July 5	First Montamara Fiesta Race (150)	Tacoma Road Race Course	Tacoma, Washington	5 mile road course	231-300 cu in.		Eddie Pullen
July 5	Tacoma Race 2 (150)	Tacoma Road Race Course	Tacoma, Washington	5 mile road course	301-450 cu in.		Earl Cooper
July 5	Tacoma Race 3 (200)	Tacoma Road Race Course	Tacoma, Washington	5 mile road course	Free-for-all	Earl Cooper	Teddy Tetzlaff
July 6	Montamarathon Trophy Race (250)	Tacoma Road Race Course	Tacoma, Washington	5 mile road course	Free-for-all	Hughie Hughes	Teddy Tetzlaff
August 25	Columbus Race (200)	Driving Park	Columbus, Ohio	1 mile dirt oval	Free-for-all	Charles Elliott	Spencer Wishart
August 30	Aurora Trophy Race (152)	Elgin Road Race Course	Elgin, Illinois	8.47 mile road course	300 cu in.	Eddie Pullen	Hughie Hughes
August 30	Illinois Trophy Race (203)	Elgin Road Race Course	Elgin, Illinois	8.47 mile road course	450 cu in.		Charles Merz
August 30	Jencks Trophy Race (101)	Elgin Road Race Course	Elgin, Illinois	8.47 mile road course	600 cu in.	Harry Endicott	Harry Endicott
August 31	Elgin Race 4* (254)	Elgin Road Race Course	Elgin, Illinois	8.47 mile road course			Ralph DePalma
August 31	Elgin National Trophy Race* (305)	Elgin Road Race Course	Elgin, Illinois	8.47 mile road course	Free-for-all		Ralph DePalma
October 2	William K. Vanderbilt Cup (299)	Wauwatosa Road Race Course	Milwaukee, Wisconsin	7.88 mile road course	301-600 cu in.	Ralph DePalma	Ralph DePalma
October 5	Wisconsin Challenge Trophy Race* (173)	Wauwatosa Road Race Course	Milwaukee, Wisconsin	7.88 mile road course	161-230 cu in.	Ray Snyder	Harry Endicott
October 5	Pabst Blue Ribbon Trophy Race* (220)	Wauwatosa Road Race Course	Milwaukee, Wisconsin	7.88 mile road course	231-300 cu in.	Louis Nikrent	Mortimer Roberts
October 5	American Grand Prize (410)	Wauwatosa Road Race Course	Milwaukee, Wisconsin	7.88 mile road course	ACA sanction; non-championship event; David Bruce-Brown and his riding mechanic Tony Scudellari fatally injured in practice, Ralph DePalma seriously injured in race	Bob Burman	Caleb Bragg
November 5	Brighton Beach Race (100)	Brighton Beach Dirt Track	Brooklyn, New York	1 mile dirt oval	Free-for-all	Neil Whalen	Ralph Mulford

* Events on same date were run simultaneously.

== Leading National Championship standings ==
The points paying system for the 1909–1915 and 1917–1919 season were retroactively applied in 1927 and revised in 1951 using the points system from 1920.

#	Driver	Sponsor	Points
1	Ralph DePalma	Mercedes	2000
2	Teddy Tetzlaff	Fiat	1900
3	Joe Dawson	National	1000
4	Hughie Hughes	Mercer	890
5	Ralph Mulford	Knox	870

== General references ==
- http://www.champcarstats.com/year/1912.htm accessed 8/21/15
- http://www.teamdan.com/archive/gen/indycar/1912.html accessed 8/21/15
