= Harry Endicott =

American racing driver (1881–1913)

- Endicott, circa 1913
- Born: Harry Carlyle Endicott; June 16, 1881 Frankfort, Indiana, U.S.
- Died: September 5, 1913 (aged 32) Jackson, Michigan, U.S.

Champ Car career
- 10 races run over 4 years
- First race: 1910 Illinois Trophy (Elgin)
- Last race: 1913 Chicago Auto Club Trophy (Elgin)
- First win: 1912 Jencks Trophy (Elgin)
- Last win: 1912 Wisconsin Challenge Trophy (Wauwatosa)
Wins	Podiums	Poles
2	2	0

Harry Carlyle Endicott (June 16, 1881 – September 5, 1913) was an American racing driver. He was especially good at road course racing. Endicott was killed in a dirt oval practice crash in 1913.

== Biography ==
Endicott was born on June 16, 1881, in Frankfort, Indiana to William M. Endicott. He was the younger brother to Bill Endicott.

== Racing career ==
Endicott followed his brother Bill into racing in 1904. He started racing in the American Automobile Association Contest Board Champ Car series in 1910. Endicott entered two races at the Elgin Road Race Course with a best finish of eighth place. He also withdrew from a race at the Long Island Motor Parkway.

In 1911, Endicott qualified in third place for the 1911 Indianapolis 500 before finishing 16th. Endicott had another third place start in the Dick Ferris Trophy Race at the Santa Monica Road Race Course later that year; he crashed out after completing three laps.

In 1912, Endicott entered and won two AAA races. After starting on the pole position, he won the Wisconsin Trophy at the Wauwatosa Road Race Course; he followed it up with winning the Jencks Trophy Race at the Elgin Road Race Course (Elgin, Illinois). At the Elgin race, he wore a leather mask which was rare at the time.

In 1913, Endicott started tenth at the 1913 Indianapolis 500 and finished 21st after completing only 21 (of 200) laps with transmission failure. Endicott raced twice at the Tacoma Road Race Course with fourth-place finishes both times. His last AAA race happened at Elgin where he finished fourth.

Endicott died on September 5, 1913, in Jackson, Michigan, in a motorsport practice accident and his riding mechanic, George Benedict, was injured. Endicott's tire burst which caused his car to run into a steam roller. He was buried at Holy Cross and Saint Joseph Cemetery in Indianapolis, Indiana. His brother retired from racing for several years after his death.

== Motorsports career results ==
=== Indianapolis 500 results ===
Year	Car	Start	Qual	Rank	Finish	Laps	Led	Retired
1911	3	3	—	—	16	126	0	Flagged
1913	1	10	76.350	23	21	23	0	Transmission
Totals						149	0	

Starts	2
Poles	0
Front Row	1
Wins	0
Top 5	0
Top 10	0
Retired	1

== Images ==
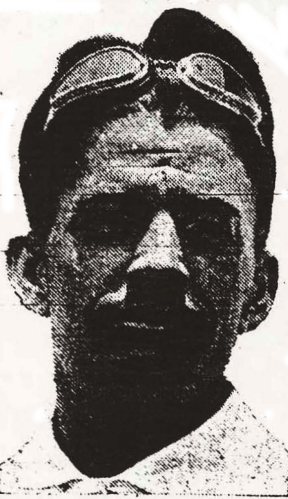
1911

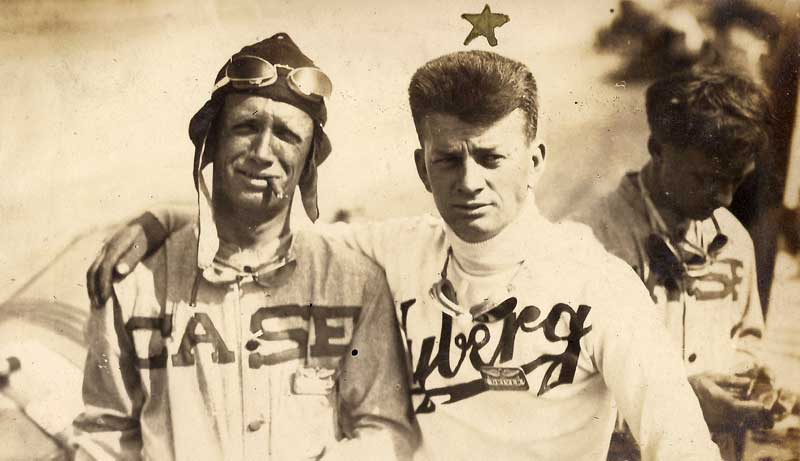
"Farmer" Bill Endicott and Harry Endicott
