= Hughie Hughes =

British racing driver (1878–1916)

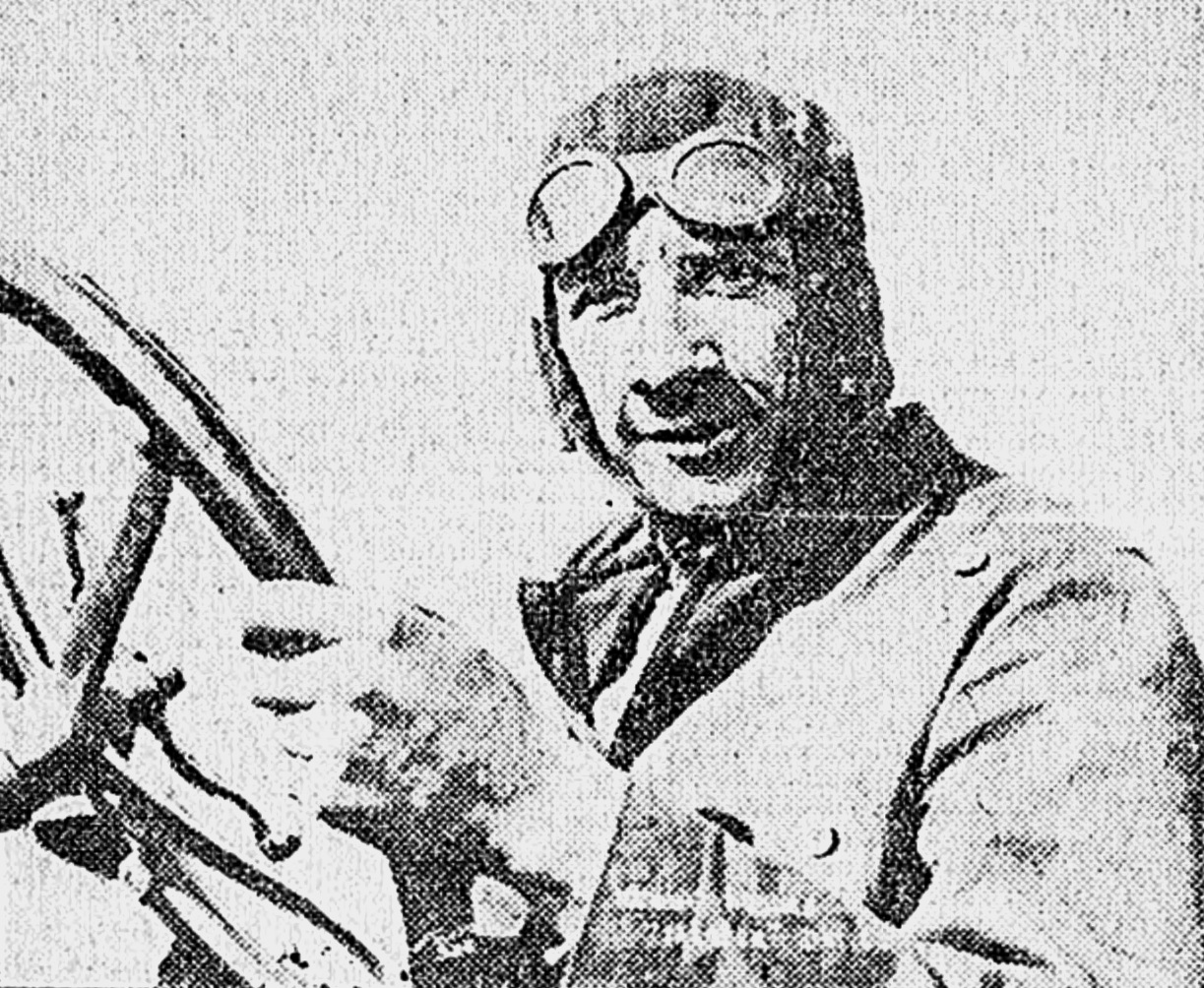
- Hughes in 1911
- Born: Hugh Hughes circa 1878 London, England, U.K.
- Died: 2 December 1916 (aged 37–38) Uniontown, Pennsylvania, U.S.

Champ Car career
- 28 races run over 7 years
- Best finish: 18th (1916)
- First race: 1909 Lowell Trophy (Merrimack Valley)
- Last race: 1916 Harkness Trophy (Sheepshead Bay)
- First win: 1911 Kane County Trophy (Elgin)
- Last win: 1914 Golden Potlach Trophy (Tacoma)
Wins	Podiums	Poles
4	12	0

Hugh Hughes (c. 1878 – 2 December 1916) was a British racing driver who participated in the 1911 Indianapolis 500 and the 1912 Indianapolis 500.

== Biography ==
Hughes was born in London, England, and moved to the United States in his twenties. He lived in the U.S. for more than a decade, with his last residence being in Los Angeles, California.

Hughes was killed in an accident on 2 December 1916 at Uniontown Speedway in Uniontown, Pennsylvania. Driver Frank Galvin, with his mechanic Gaston Weigle on board, crashed his car into the stands at about 100 miles an hour. Hughes had just crashed his own car and was talking to a teammate at the side of the track when he was hit.

== Motorsports career results ==
=== Indianapolis 500 results ===
Year	Car	Start	Qual	Rank	Finish	Laps	Led	Retired
1911	36	32	—	—	12	200	0	Running
1912	21	17	81.810	11	3	200	0	Running
Totals						400	0	

Starts	2
Poles	0
Front Row	0
Wins	0
Top 5	1
Top 10	1
Retired	0
