= Elgin Road Races =

American auto race

The Elgin Road Races were a series of automobile races that took place on closed public roads in Elgin, Illinois between 1910 and 1920. The races were suspended during World War I and resumed in 1919 and 1920. The Elgin National Trophy became one of the most prestigious American automobile races of the early 20th Century and contributed significantly to the development of the modern automobile.

== Event history ==
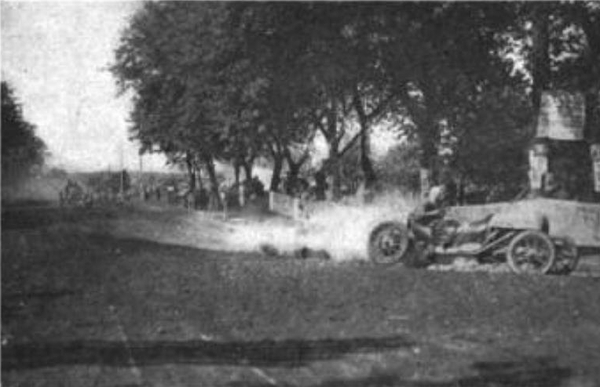
Gus Monckmeier driving a Staver at the 1910 Elgin National Road Races, Automotive Industries, Vol. 23.

In 1909, the Chicago Motor Club (CMC) organized the first automobile race in the American Midwest at the Crown Point Road Race Circuit in Crown Point, Indiana. However, financial problems and road conditions forced the club to find a new location for the race. Frank Berry Wood, an Elgin resident and a member of the CMC, was determined to move the races to Elgin, and scouted an 8.5 miles (13.7 km) circuit consisting of oil-soaked dirt and gravel roads with no crossroads, railroad tracks, high hills or towns to pass through. The CMC officials were impressed by Wood's street circuit and the Elgin Automobile Road Race Association was formed to raise the necessary funds.

On August 23, 1910, the first Elgin Road Races were held and were an immediate success, drawing thousands of spectators due to its proximity to the Chicago metropolitan area. The top class races were sponsored by the Elgin National Watch Company who offered a $1,000 prize and a silver trophy to the winner. The races attracted the top national racing champions as well as many of the major automobile manufacturers. Ralph Mulford drove a Lozier to win the inaugural race with an average speed of 62.5 miles an hour. The most successful competitor at the Elgin races was Ralph DePalma, who won the Elgin Trophy four times (1912-1914, 1920).

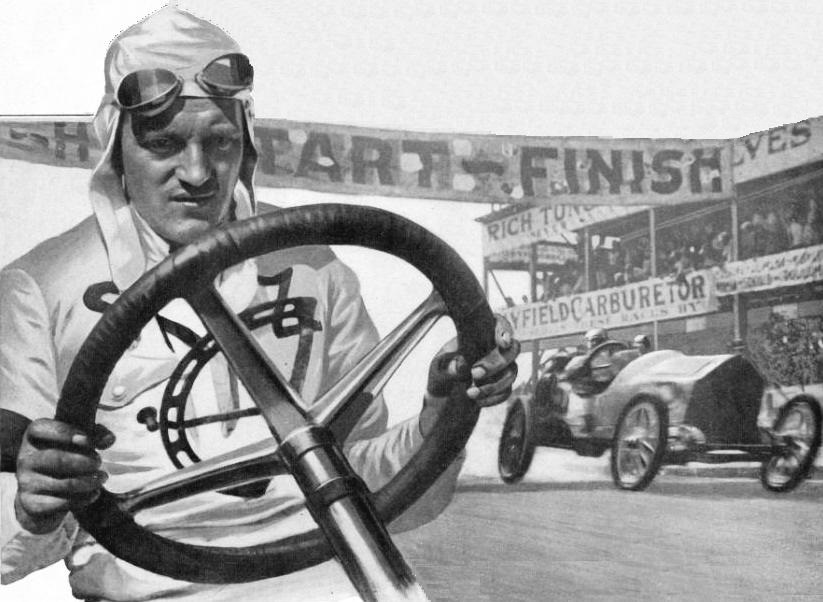
Gil Andersen and his Stutz during the 1913 races

Automobile manufacturers were attracted to the Elgin races because the course provided few obstacles to reduce the car's speed. Some of the manufacturers that participated in the Elgin Road Races were Ford, Chevrolet, Stutz, Duesenberg, Mercer, Marmon, and Hudson. The races contributed significantly to the development of the modern automobile. The first competitions featured factory stock vehicles, however after 1911 specialized racing cars were allowed to compete. Thus drivers acquired European race cars, and Mercedes cars of the German Daimler Motoren Gesellschaft appeared and won, too. One of the 1-2-3 winning Mercedes 4.5 liter cars of the July 1914 French Grand Prix, displayed in London by the unsuspecting Germans, was commandeered by the British, the engine valve train design copied for Rolls Royce Eagle fighter airplane engines.

As automobile speeds continued to increase, the races became more dangerous and controversial. Five competitors lost their lives during the races, three in 1911 and two in 1914. Local farmers also began to object to road closures and the races were discontinued after the 1920 race. The races were revived in 1933 to coincide with the Chicago World's Fair. One of the 1933 competitions was among the first officially organized stock car races in the United States.

== National Trophy race winners ==
Date	Winner	Manufacturer
8/27/1910	Ralph Mulford	Lozier
8/26/1911	Len Zengel	National
8/31/1912	Ralph DePalma	Mercedes
8/30/1913	Gil Andersen	Stutz
8/22/1914	Ralph DePalma	Mercedes
8/21/1915	Gil Andersen	Stutz
8/23/1919	Tommy Milton	Duesenberg
8/21/1920	Ralph DePalma	Ballot
8/26/1933	Phil Shafer	Buick
