= Gus Monckmeier =

American racing driver (1888–1962)

- Born: Gustav Carl Frederick Monckmeier; December 13, 1888 Stolzenau, Hanover, Prussia, German Empire
- Died: October 14, 1962 (aged 73) Davenport, Iowa, U.S.

Champ Car career
- 1 race run over 1 year
- First race: 1911 Elgin National Trophy (Elgin)
Wins	Podiums	Poles
0	0	0

Gustav Carl Frederick Monckmeier (December 13, 1888 – October 14, 1962) was an American racing driver and inventor. He is known for his participation in the 1911 and 1912 1,000-plus-mile Around Lake Michigan reliability races, which he recreated in 1961.

== Early life ==
Monckmeier was born in Stolzenau, Germany and emigrated to the United States in 1901, where he had an uncle in Brooklyn, New York; within a year at age 14, he found work at the American Mercedes factory in Queens.

== Racing career ==
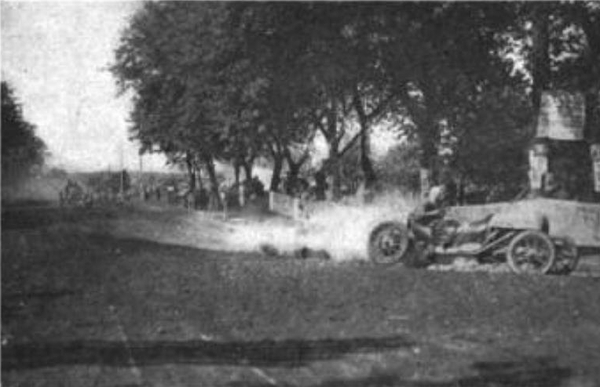
Monckmeier in "Staver Chicago doing a turn like a whirlwind," at 1910 Elgin Nationals, Automotive Industries, Vol. 23.

In 1910, he appears as an entrant in the Wisconsin State Association Reliability Tour's Milwaukee Sentinel Trophy, driving a Staver entered by the Stephenson Motor Car Company. He quickly became a Staver factory driver, research engineer and test driver, often called "The Little Swede".

Staver was in the right place at the right time, because 1910 marked the debut of the Elgin National Road Races, which instantly became one of the premier events of the day. After Ned Crane was disqualified on the final lap of the 1910 running (for almost taking Arthur Greiner's National off the track when pitting) and Chester Cheney's car broke down after 42 minutes, Monckmeier was left to carry the flag, taking third place in the Fox River Trophy in just over three hours before more than 50,000 spectators. From there, he was off and running, sparkling at the Algonquin Hill Climb and notching a perfect score in the roadster division at the Chicago Motor Club's 1,000-mile reliability run.

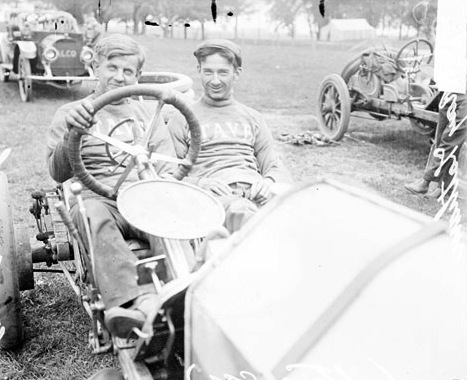
Monckmeier and mechanic Ray Latham in a Staver at the Elgin National Road Races, c. August 28, 1911

Ned Crane didn't make it back for the 1911 season, killed while testing a Buick in April, but Monckmeier continued to win efficiency contests, hillclimbs and endurance events, soon joined by driver Emery T. Knudsen. Monckmeier, Knudsen and famed driver Ralph Ireland were all on the slate for Staver at Elgin that August, when on August 21 Ireland was killed in practice as a result of a burst tire. "I'll never ride in a racing automobile again," said his mechanician (riding mechanic) Joe O'Brien, who was thrown from the vehicle and spent a week in a hospital. "This once has been enough for me. Ireland was as good and as careful a driver as they make—it was simply chance that killed him. I'm not going to take any more of those kind of chances."

Monckmeier wasn't scared off—motor racing deaths weren't exactly front-page news, and with Knudsen and Californian Joe Nikrent (longtime holder of many Speedway Class B and C records in a Buick), did very well for the rest of the year, dominating September racing at Amarillo and Peoria.

Monckmeier, mechanic F. G. Salisbury and unidentified others in a Staver (middle) during the 1912 Around Lake Michigan Run

Nikrent returned to Los Angeles for the 1912 season, but 1911 came back to haunt Staver. In the middle of another successful Around Lake Michigan run on October 21, 1912, the AAA suspended them from all competition through June 1, 1913, for a rule 75 violation: Their 1911 entries, run in the Stock class, had been revealed to be less than stock. Monckmeier and Knudsen, hundreds of miles away from Chicago and incommunicado, completed the race anyway, Monckmeier winning the W. E. Stahlmaker cup for touring cars. It appears the victory was allowed to stand, as Monckmeier was pictured as winner of the Touring Car Class on the cover of Motor Age.

When they started racing again in the summer of 1913, it was now the 70 hp Staver 65s that took the limelight. Monckmeier set a record in front of 35,000 spectators at the Illinois State Fair in October, 54 seconds on the mile track (eclipsed that same day by the Louis Disbrow's fantastic Simplex Zip), and won the ten-mile club championship race for Chicago:

- "[Monckmeier] in his Staver-Chicago, was the surprise of the days, as he made a valiant fight against the field of special racing cars and finished in the money in all his starts. In his first appearance of the day he smashed the track record by negotiating the distance in :54 in the mile time trials, but this time was later lowered by Disbrow [:50]. Monckmeier also walloped [Benz driver] Eddie Hearne in the club championship race when he carried home the cup for the Chicago Motor Club."

He continued to race a Staver 65 through the fall of 1913 in the South, but Staver's fortunes were in decline and the company never won another race.

Monckmeier wasn't quite done winning in a Staver, however: On October 1, 1914, four months after Staver ceased making automobiles, he won a 30-mile race on a one-mile dirt track at Johnson County Fairgrounds Racetrack in Iowa City, Iowa, with a time of 36 minutes, 34 seconds, beating two Buicks and a Mercer, along with taking two other first-place trophies over two days of racing. The 30-mile race is considered his sole recorded American open-wheel, track racing victory.

== Inventions, later life and death ==
Monckmeier Universal Piston Inserter

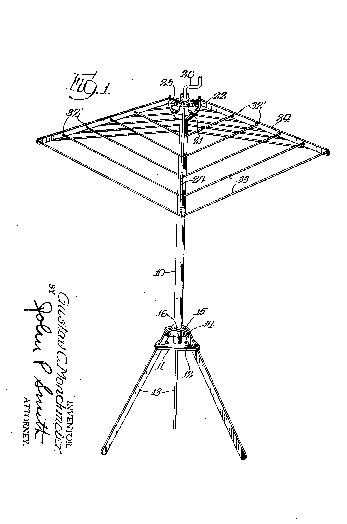
Monckmeier patent clothes drier

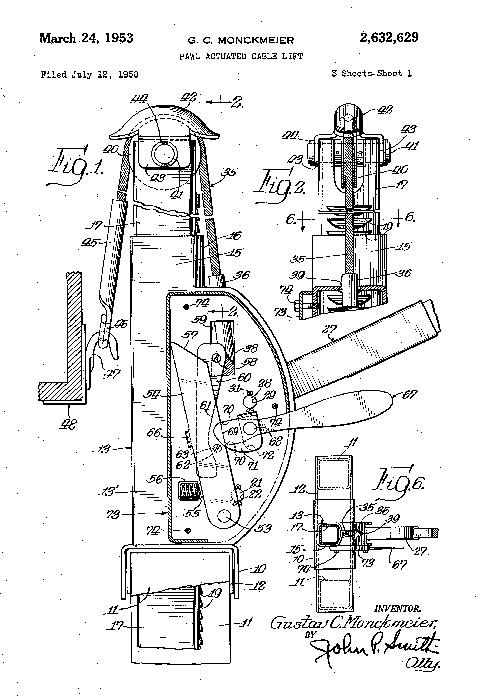
Monckmeier patent pawl actuated cable lift

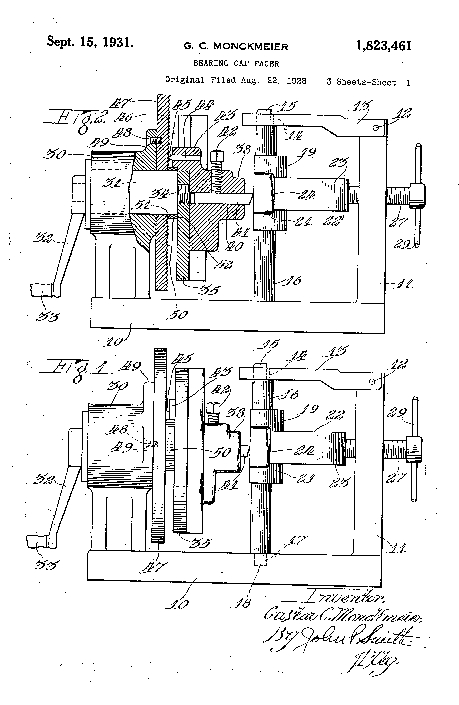
Bearing cap finishing device

After his career with Staver finished, Monckmeier settled in Cedar Rapids, Iowa, where he began marketing a "Universal Piston Inserter" of his own design. His US 1585309 "Wear-compensating bolt" was used in the development of the automotive disc brake. While most of his inventions were for automotive applications, he also registered a US 2259390 "Portable collapsible clothes drier" and US 2632629 "Pawl actuated cable lift" in common use today.

By the 1920s, Monckmeier had relocated to Tipton, Iowa, then to Davenport, Iowa, in order to market his inventions as the Ever-Tite Manufacturing Co., which also offered plating and machining services. They may also have produced goods for the US Government during the Second World War.

In 1961, he recreated the 1911 Around Lake Michigan run with reporter Hal Foust, detailed in a four-part series of articles in The Chicago Daily Tribune.

Monckmeier died of a heart attack on October 14, 1962, aged 73.

== Partial list of Monckmeier patents ==
US 1481382 "Piston-ring extractor"

US 1627401 "Wear-compensating bolt"

US 1646416 "Automatic thrust bearing"

US 1829940 "Screw clamping device with automatic clamping means"

US 1823461 "Thrust bearing scraping tool"

US 1971078 "Bearing cap finishing device"

US 2798741 "Coupler with a pair of pivoted jaws and automatic latching means"

US 1977734 "Luggage and trunk carrier"

US 2632629 "Pawl actuated cable lift"

US 2259390 "Clothes drier"

US 2148242 "Automobile bumper post"

US 2195280 "Variable drive sprocket wheel for bicycles"

US 1825410 "Automatic take up bearing"
