= Geo D. Whitcomb Company =

Former American locomotive manufacturer

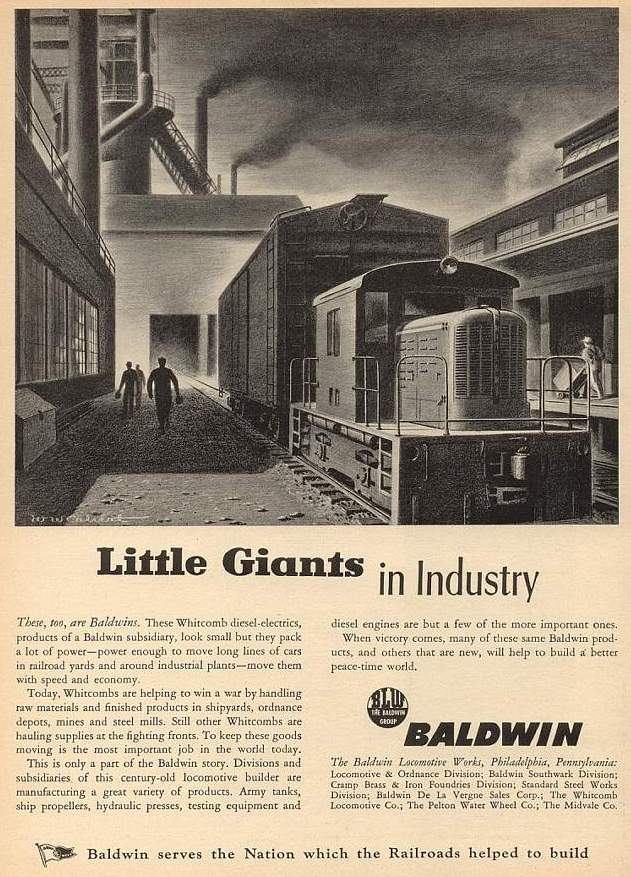
A World War II print advertisement for Baldwin (Whitcomb) "Little Giant" switcher locomotives.

The Geo D. Whitcomb Company was founded by George Dexter Whitcomb (1834–1914), of Chicago, Illinois, who started a modest machine shop in 1878, and began the manufacture of coal mining machinery, laying the foundation for the concern that became known as The Whitcomb Locomotive Company.

== Beginnings ==
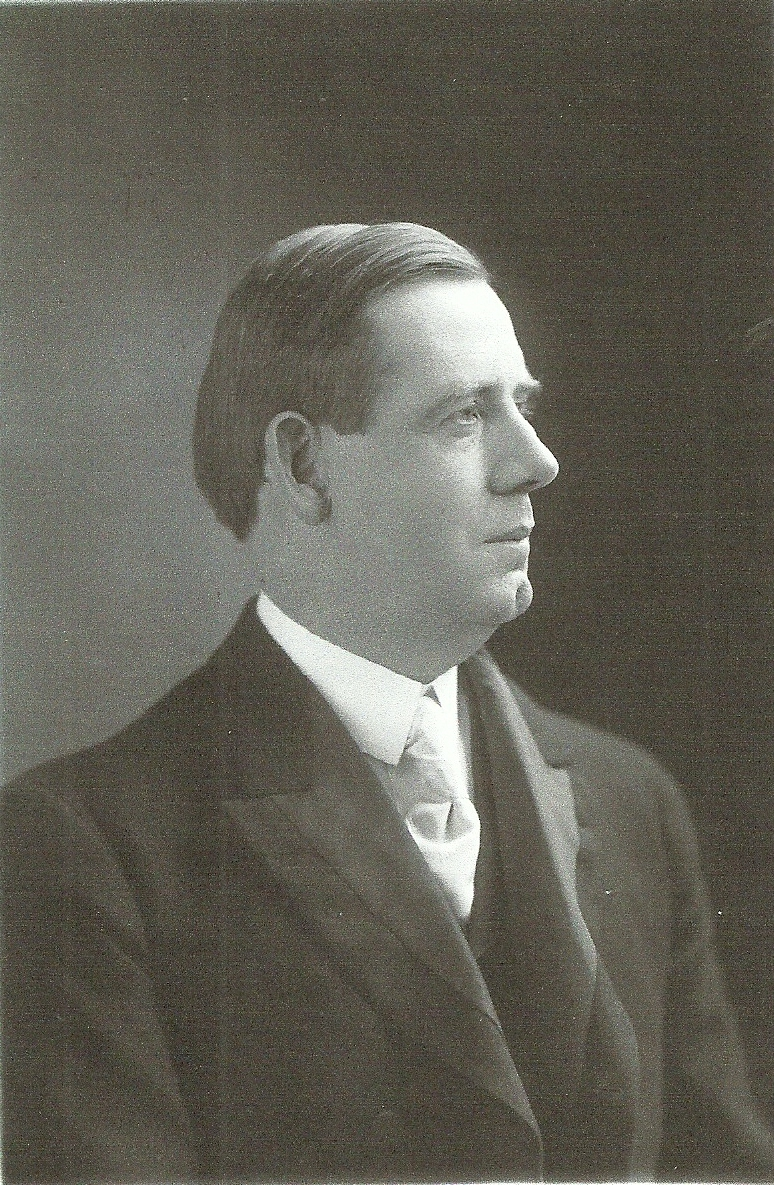
William Card Whitcomb, photograph courtesy of John Whitcomb Castle

Early in life, George Dexter Whitcomb moved with his family from Brandon, VT, to Kent, OH. Here he joined the Pan-Handle Railroad as purchasing agent. He worked on tests of the newly invented Westinghouse Air Brake and was one of the original stockholders and members of the board of directors of the Westinghouse Air Brake Company, when it was organized.

In 1868, George and his wife Leadora had a son, William Card Whitcomb. In 1889, William Card graduated from the University of Southern California and joined his father's business.

In about 1870, George moved to Chicago and became the manager of the Wilmington Coal Mining and Manufacturing Company's mines at Braidwood, IL. He also managed the Wilmington Coal Association. He purchased the rights to the Harrison Mining Machine, a compressed air power pick that could be used by one person. He developed it into the "Puncher Machine" - the first successful undercutting machine in the US. He resigned his position with the coal company about 1878 to focus on mining machine business.

In 1886, he relocated to California where he built a home and founded the Los Angeles suburb of Glendora. In 1896, the George D. Whitcomb Company was incorporated in Illinois.

About 1900, William became vice president of the company. In April 1906, he developed the company's first successful gasoline locomotive that was built for a large Central Illinois coal mine. In 1907, George resigned, leaving William the president and majority stock owner.

== Rochelle factory ==
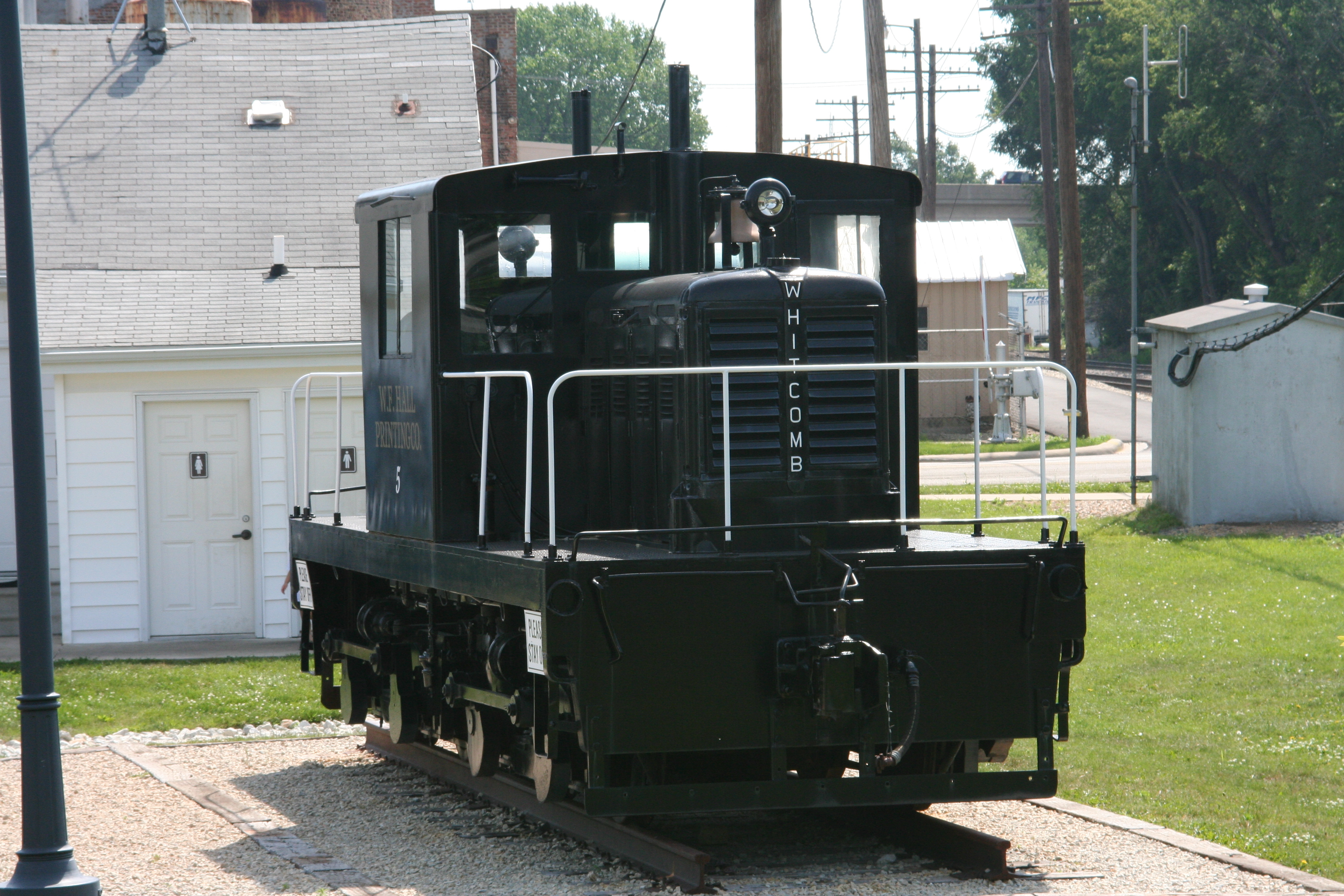
A Whitcomb locomotive at Rochelle Railroad Park in Rochelle, Illinois.

The Geo D. Whitcomb Company's largest knitting machinery customer was the Vassar Swiss Knitting Company of Rochelle, in northern Illinois. In 1907, the company moved to Rochelle, where they continued to build knitting machinery and gasoline powered locomotives for coal and metal mines. The demand for gasoline locomotive required larger production facilities. In 1912 the plant was moved to larger facilities in Rochelle. The company ended its knitting machinery production to concentrate on locomotive production.

George Dexter Whitcomb died in 1914, in Los Angeles, California. His son, William Card Whitcomb, assumed control of the company. William was responsible for sales, accounting and engineering.

During World War I the Whitcomb plant was devoted to government orders. Hundreds of armor-plated locomotives were built for overseas service on trench railways in France. These small 6-ton and 9-ton, narrow gauge locomotives proved highly efficient in trench warfare and they were used extensively in hauling needed supplies up to the front lines. The Whitcomb Company received the "Certificate of Merit" from the United States War Department.

Many new innovations in the locomotive field were being introduced during this period. The first explosion-proof electric mine locomotive was designed and built by Whitcomb, in 1914. After exhaustive tests the United States Bureau of Mines issued Whitcomb a "Permissibility Plate." Whitcomb was the first builder of locomotives for underground work to receive such an endorsement. The first Whitcomb electric trolley locomotive was produced in 1921, and in 1929 Whitcomb engineers designed and built the largest gasoline-electric locomotive that had then been offered to American railroads. This development was closely followed by the diesel-electrics, which revolutionized and forever changed the American rail transportation system.

In September 1926 William Whitcomb now relaxed his personal oversight of the operation of his company. He hired Carl Heim from Chicago, to take over many of the company's operations management, including in the positions of Vice President and Treasurer.

=== Partin-Palmer automobile ===
From 1914 to at least 1916 the Geo D. Whitcomb Company assembled Brass Era cars in Rochelle for an automobile company, named Partin-Palmer.

The Partin Mfg. Co. was a large automobile sales agency in Chicago, that in 1913 joined with the Palmer Motor Car Co. of Henry Palmer in Detroit, to manufacture cycle cars, with a model called Partin-Palmer. The company first moved to Chicago to take over the Staver-Chicago automobile factory. By 1914, Partin and Palmer were no longer with the company, and it moved to Rochelle where the Geo D. Whitcomb Company assembled them for a year.

In 1915 the company got into financial trouble in Chicago, and the car's name was changed to Commonwealth (1917–1922). In the 1916 catalog of the Commonwealth Motors Company, it states that Partin-Palmer automobiles were being produced in Rochelle under the personal supervision of Mr. W. C. Whitcomb, vice-president of the Commonwealth Motors Company. Production moved to Joliet, Illinois. In 1922, Leland Goodspeed designed a new car for the company, which became the Checker Cab.

A restored Partin-Palmer automobile is displayed at the Flagg Township Museum in Rochelle, Illinois.

== Baldwin Locomotive Works ==
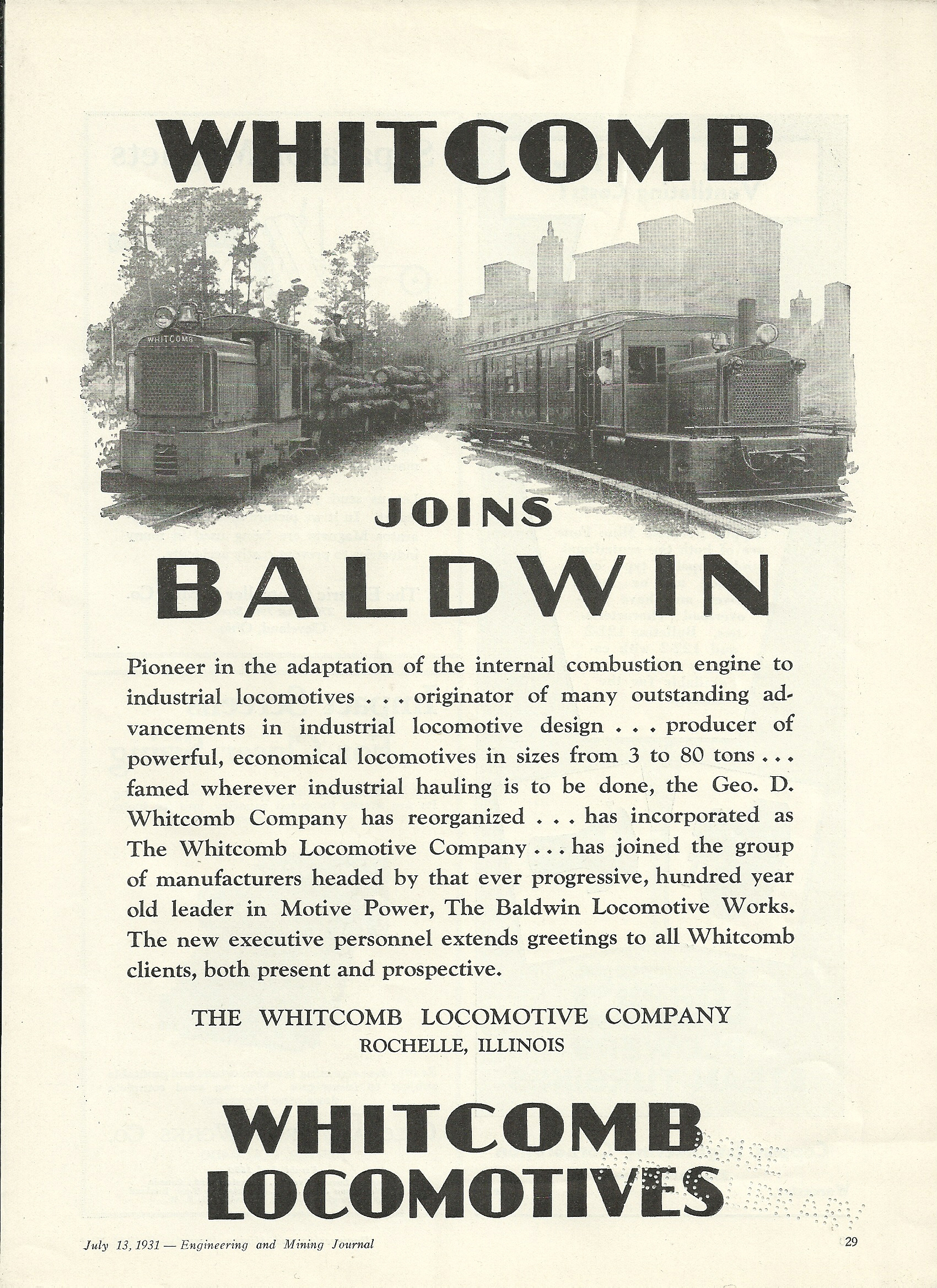
Baldwin ad from Engineering and Mining Journal, July 13, 1931.

Beginning in 1927, the Baldwin Locomotive Works began representing the Geo. D. Whitcomb Co. in the sales division, using the global organization of Baldwin to assist Whitcomb in overseas sales. In 1928, Whitcomb and Heim conducted a recapitalization of the Whitcomb Company, and invited Baldwin to participate. Baldwin accepted and purchased about half of the offered stock, with William Whitcomb and Carl Heim remaining in control of the majority of the company stock. In March 1930 Baldwin placed three of its officers on the Whitcomb board of directors, including then Baldwin President George Houston. This gave Baldwin three out of the seven board members.

By late 1930, in the Great Depression, The Whitcomb Company was having cash flow problems. Baldwin offered an unsecured loan for $125,000, in the form of a 90-day promissory note issued in December 1930. The condition of the loan was that Baldwin would be given a fourth board member for the duration of the loan, giving Baldwin four out of the seven board members, and so majority control of the board. On March 5, 1931, the bank holding the largest cash reserve of the G. D. Whitcomb Company seized the account to apply towards another debt that the company owed the bank. This left the Geo D. Whitcomb Company unable to pay its debts.

With a majority of members on the board of directors, Baldwin was able to direct the board to file for voluntary bankruptcy. Although William Whitcomb voted against the action, the bankruptcy was filed in Federal Court in the Northern District of Illinois. This move ended the Whitcomb family ownership of one of the most innovative industrial companies of its time.

=== Whitcomb Locomotive Company ===
In April, Baldwin created a new corporation and called it the "Whitcomb Locomotive Company," in the state of Delaware. On April 13, 1931, the Federal Court put the assets of the Geo D. Whitcomb Company up for sale. Those assets were then purchased by the newly formed Whitcomb Locomotive Company, a fully owned subsidiary of the Baldwin Locomotive Works. Both William Whitcomb and Carl Heim were removed as officers of the company. Heim was tried for embezzlement of approximately $75,000 of Geo D. Whitcomb Company funds, but was acquitted.

On November 15, 1932, it was announced that the Whitcomb Locomotive Company acquired the Milwaukee Locomotive Manufacturing Company. The Milwaukee Locomotive, started in 1907, had been operating as a department of the National Brake and Electric Company of Milwaukee, a subsidiary of Westinghouse Air Brake Company. As a result of the sale, Westinghouse became a stockholder in Whitcomb Locomotive.

In February 1934, William Whitcomb filed suit against Baldwin Locomotive Works in Chicago Circuit Court, to recover the lost value of his company stock. However, after several years of litigation the case was ultimately dismissed in May 1937.

=== World War II ===
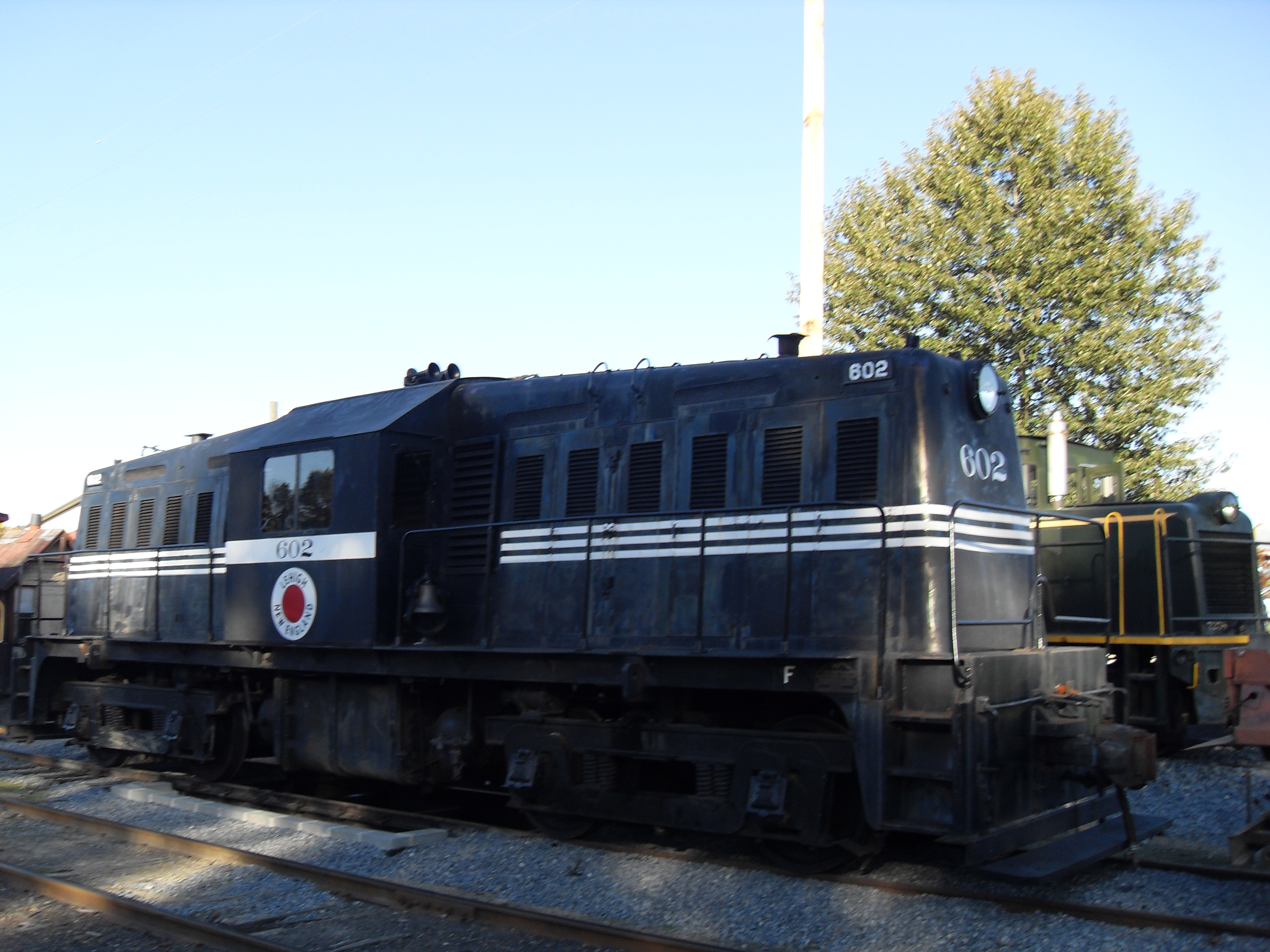
65-DE-19A diesel-electric built in 1944 for the USATC, now #602 on the WK&S Railroad, PA.

During World War II the Whitcomb Locomotive Company built road switchers for military service in Europe and the Middle East. The United Kingdom ordered the first fifty two in 1941, from Baldwin Locomotive Works, who allocated the order to their Whitcomb Locomotive Company. They were center-cab Bo-Bo locomotives built as Whitcomb type 65-DE-14, and were followed by variants 65-DE-14A and 65-DE-14B in 1942 and 1943.

They served in the North African Campaign and on military trains in Palestine and Lebanon, and then in the Italian campaign. The order was received by Whitcomb for the new design in December 1941, and the first locomotives were delivered to Africa by June 1942, less than half the normal development time for a new design. By late 1944 the company was producing one 65 ton locomotive a day.

On December 31, 1943, the War Department conferred the Army-Navy Production Award ("E" award) to the Whitcomb Locomotive Company and the presentation ceremony was held in the Rochelle plant on January 26, 1944. By the end of the war two additional stars (each star representing six months) were added for continued production performance.

From this design Whitcomb developed the 65-DE-19A for the US Army Transportation Corps. They were built in 1943 and 1944 and served in many theaters of operations including Great Britain, France, Italy and Belgium.

Whitcomb 65 ton locomotives powered the first Allied trains into liberated Rome (July 4, 1944), Paris, the first supply and hospital trains into Belgium, the first train into Germany (April 9, 1945) as well as the first American powered military trains used during WW II (North Africa, early June 1942).

Post-war

After the war many were sold to civilian railways and industrial railways in the U.S., while others were sold to Canada, Cuba, Mexico, and the Netherlands. However, the Dutch soon found theirs unsatisfactory and replaced both the diesel engines and the electric traction motors in the early 1950s.

== Post World War II ==
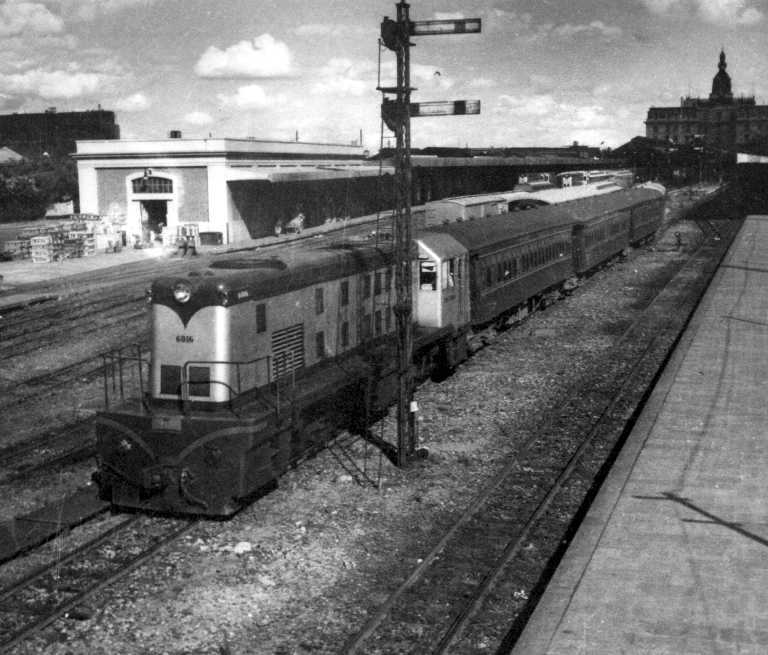
A Whitcomb locomotive acquired by Argentine Ferrocarriles Argentinos in Retiro, c. 1948.

Whitcomb continued to expand and progress after the war and the increased volume of business made it essential to expand storage and shipping facilities. A warehouse complete with the latest in material handling equipment was erected in 1947. A ten-ton overhead yard crane was installed to facilitate handling and storage of steel slabs and sheets. During 1948, a combination loading dock and locomotive test building was erected.

== End ==
The last Whitcomb Locomotive Company locomotive manufactured at Rochelle was shipped on January 4, 1952 (construction number 61189). It was a 25-ton diesel-electric locomotive delivered to the Central Procurement Agency of the Transportation Corps. This locomotive was lettered and numbered USN No. 65-00330.

In February 1952 locomotive production was moved from Rochelle in Illinois to Baldwin's factory in Eddystone, Pennsylvania. Industrial locomotives continued to be built under the Whitcomb name at Eddystone through the end of December 1952, when the name was dropped. All Whitcomb line locomotives built after then carried the B-L-H identification name.

Production of the Whitcomb Locomotive Company line, with the latter ones under B-L-H name, came to an end in March 1956 — after producing approximately 5,000 locomotives.
