= Partin Manufacturing Company (automobile company) =

Defunct American motor vehicle manufacturer

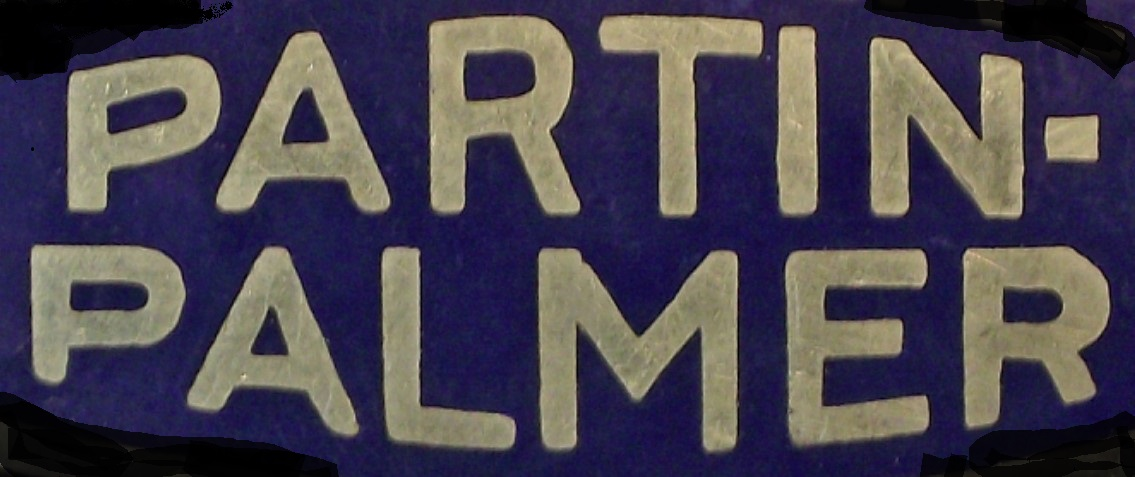
- Type: Automobile manufacturer
- Industry: Automotive
- Founded: 1913; 113 years ago
- Defunct: 1917; 109 years ago
- Fate: Reorganized
- Successor: Commonwealth Motors
- Headquarters: Chicago, Illinois, United States
- Key people: R. A. Palmer, G. H. Partin, C. C. Darnall
- Products: Automobiles
- Production output: 1,874 (1913–1917)

The Partin Manufacturing Company was a brass era American automobile manufacturer, headquartered at 29 South LaSalle Street, Chicago, Illinois from 1913 to 1917. The Partin-Palmer automobile and Pioneer cyclecar were produced.

== History ==
G. H. Partin, of the Partin Manufacturing Company, a large automobile sales agency in Chicago, joined in 1913 with the Palmer Motor Car Co. of Henry Palmer, formerly general manager of Cartercar. Palmer had formed his company from the assets of the Suburban Motor Car Company. They began by manufacturing cyclecars called the Pioneer, a Model 45 named the Partin, and a Model 38 named Partin-Palmer. The Partin model did not last to the end of 1913, and all models were subsequently called Partin-Palmers. The company first moved to Chicago to take over the Staver-Chicago automobile factory.

Partin and Palmer were no longer with the company by 1915 and the new manager, C. C. Darnall moved production to Rochelle, Illinois where the Geo D. Whitcomb Company assembled them.

In 1915 the company was reorganized as Commonwealth Motors Corporation and the cars were still called Partin-Palmers into 1917 when a new car called the Commonwealth was introduced and production moved to Joliet, Illinois.

A restored Partin-Palmer is displayed at the Flagg Township Museum in Rochelle, Illinois.

== Advertisements ==
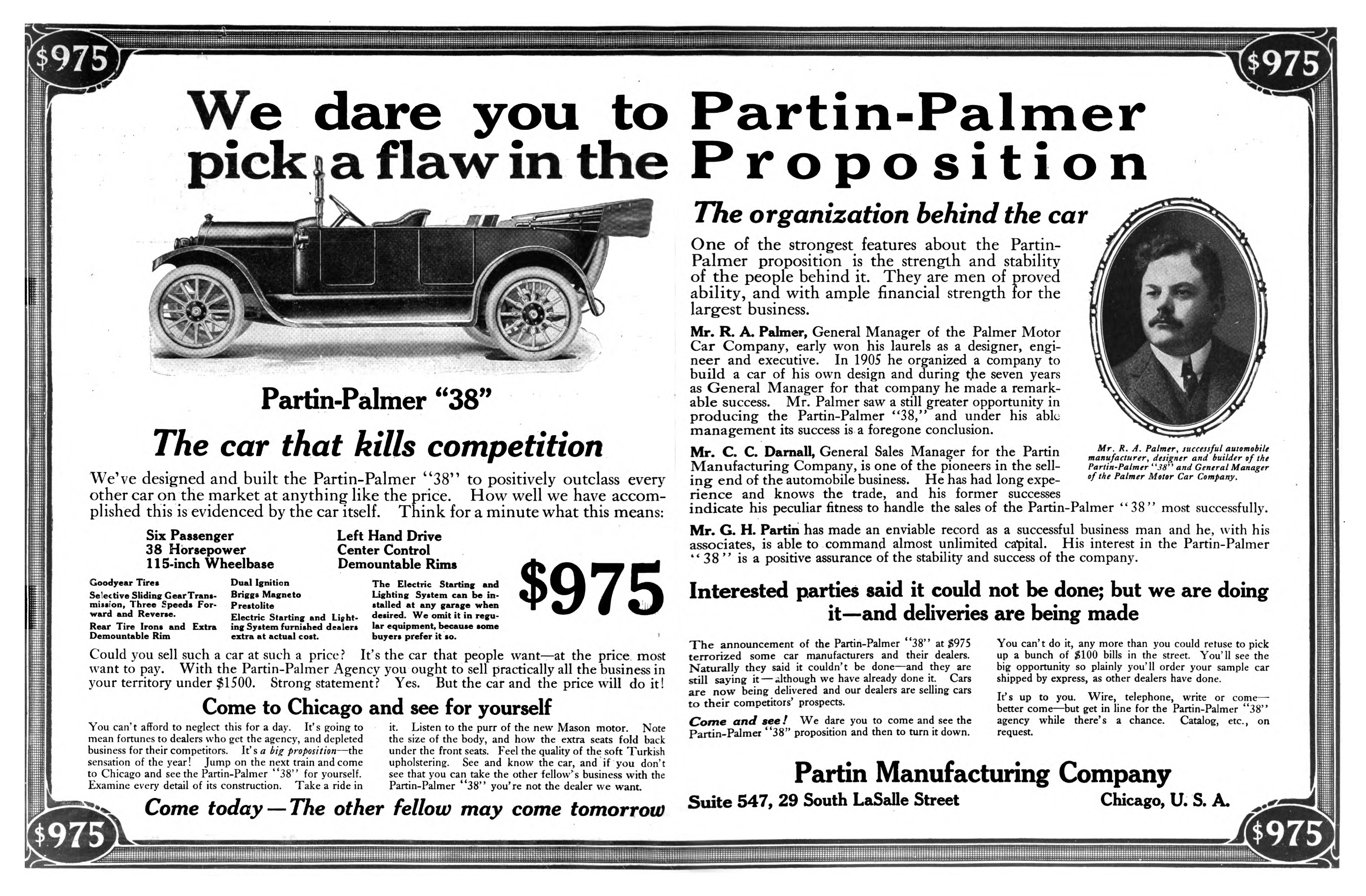
1913 Partin-Palmer two-page advertisement in Horseless Age Magazine

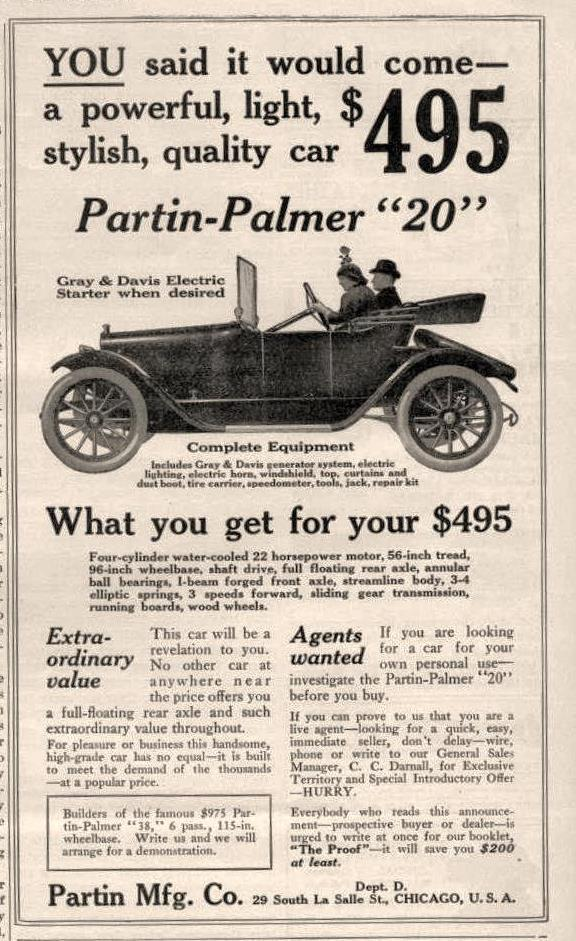
1914 Partin-Palmer Model 20 advertisement in Horseless Age Magazine

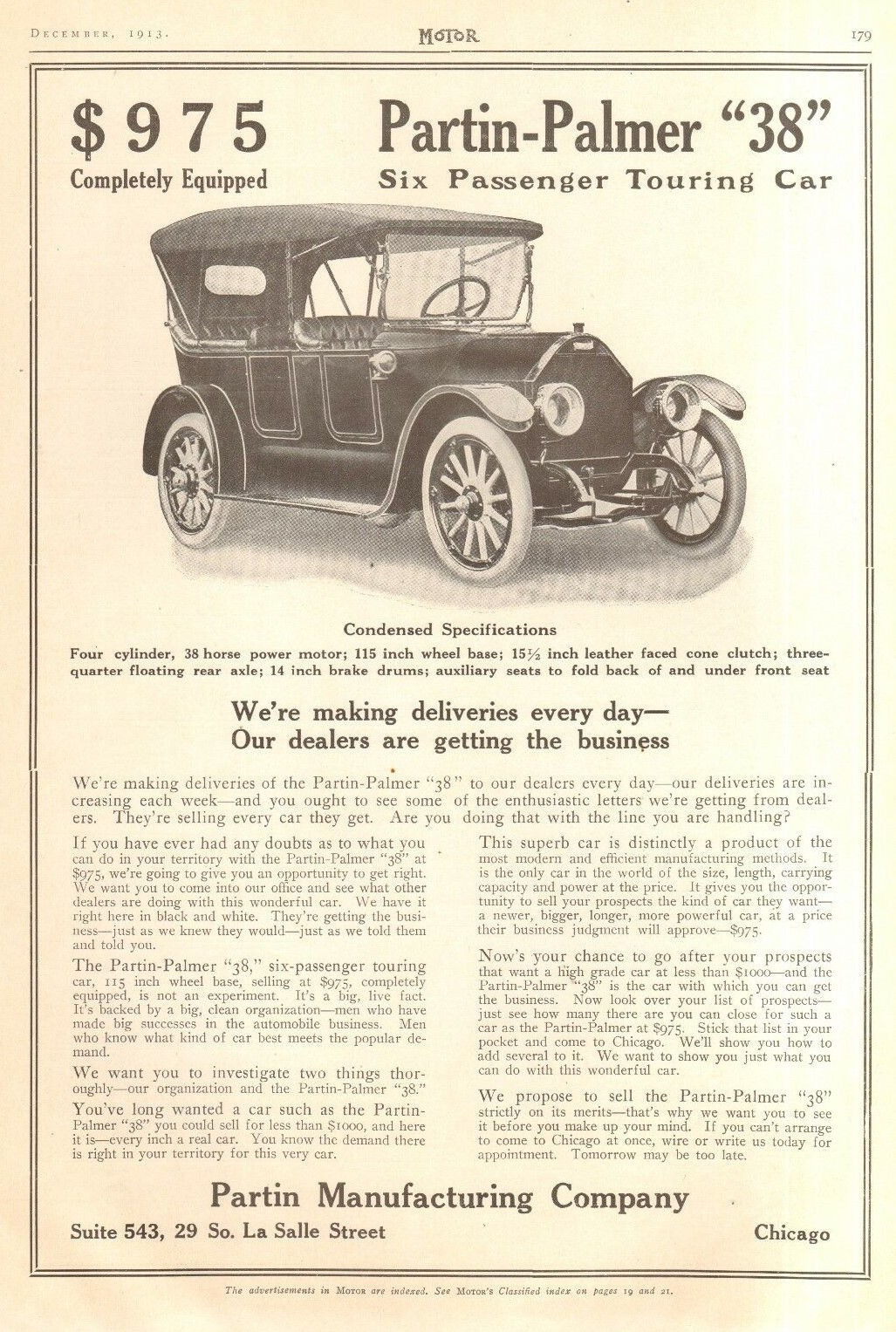
1913 Partin-Palmer Model 38 advertisement in Motor Magazine

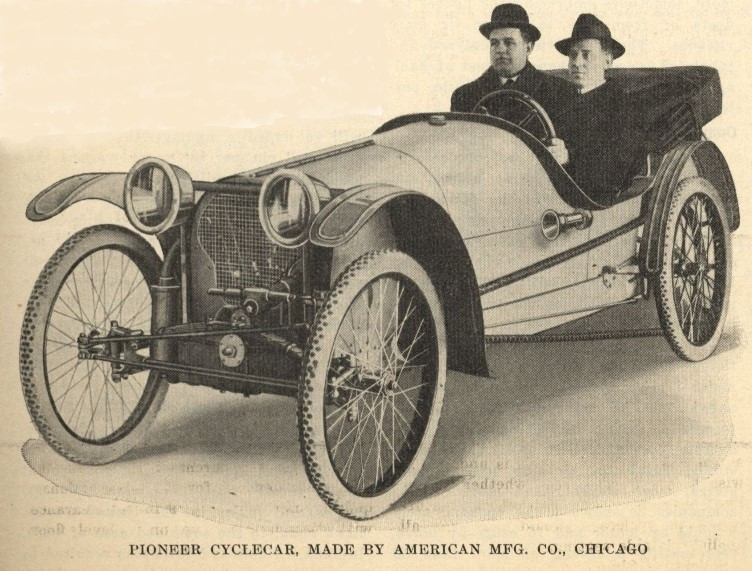
1913-1914 Pioneer Cyclecar - American Mfg. Co. - Horseless Age Magazine

== Models ==
=== Partin-Palmer 20 ===
In 1914, the Partin-Palmer 20 was a roadster offered with a four-cylinder water-cooled engine of 22 hp (16 kW), with Gray and Davis generator, optional Gray and Davis electric starter, and (still unusual) shaft drive. It had a 56 in (142 cm) tread (track) and 96 in (2438 mm) wheelbase, with ¾-elliptic springs and I-beam front axle.

The Model 20 came standard with electric lighting and horn, folding top with side curtains and dust boot, speedometer, the (typical for the period) tool kit, jack, and tire patch, all for $495 (equivalent to $15,911 in 2025). In 1916 a touring version was offered with a more powerful engine as the Model 32 priced at $675.

=== Pioneer Cyclecar ===
In late 1913 Partin Manufacturing produced a typical cyclecar with an 9-hp air-cooled V-twin, friction transmission and belt drive. On a 96-inch wheelbase, the seating was advertised as side by side, the passenger sat about a foot to the rear of the driver to allow for sufficient elbow room within the forty-inch-wide body. The Pioneer was listed as made by the American Manufacturing Company rather than Partin Manufacturing Company. The Pioneer was available only for the 1914 season and was priced at $385, equivalent to $12,375 in 2025.

=== Partin-Palmer 38 ===
Partin-Palmer Model 38 (1913)

From 1913 a six-passenger Model 38 with a 115 in (2921 mm) wheelbase was also available, for $975 (equivalent to $31,761 in 2025). For the first year a Partin Model 45 with a more powerful engine was offered.

== See also ==
- ClassisCars Journal - Pioneer Cyclecar
- Checker Cab Club Article - Partin-Palmer
- Partin-Palmer Model 20 images - Flagg Township Museum
