= Milwaukee Locomotive Manufacturing Company =

Former American locomotive manufacturer

- Founded: October 1907; 118 years ago in Milwaukee
- Defunct: July 19, 1932
- Fate: Acquired
- Successor: Geo D. Whitcomb Company
- Headquarters: Milwaukee

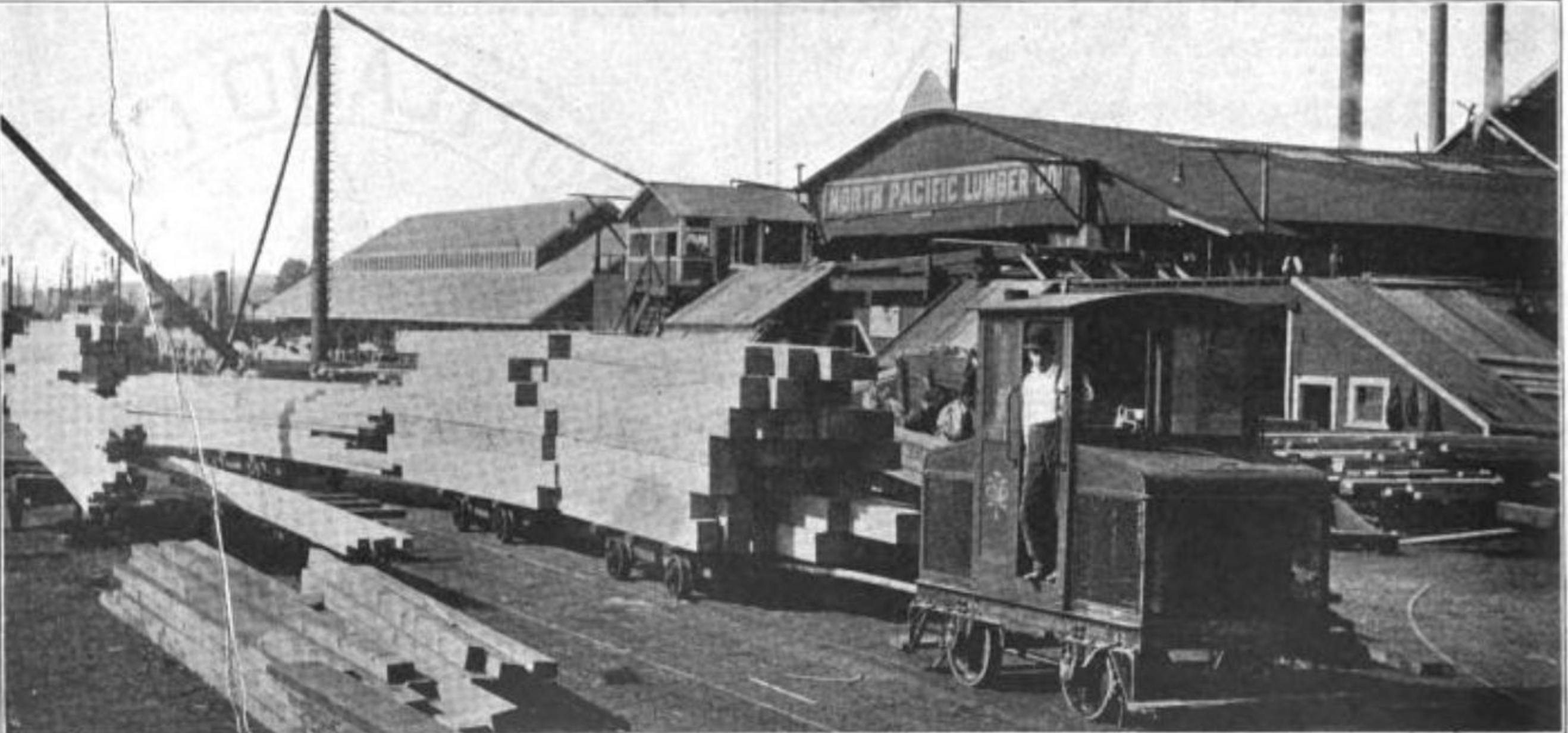
A type "A-2" gasoline locomotive at the North Pacific Lumber Company, Portland, Oregon, 1910

The Milwaukee Locomotive Manufacturing Company was an American locomotive manufacturer founded in 1907. It specialized in locomotives for industrial railroads, and was one of the first builders of gasoline locomotives for use in the mining industry.

== History ==
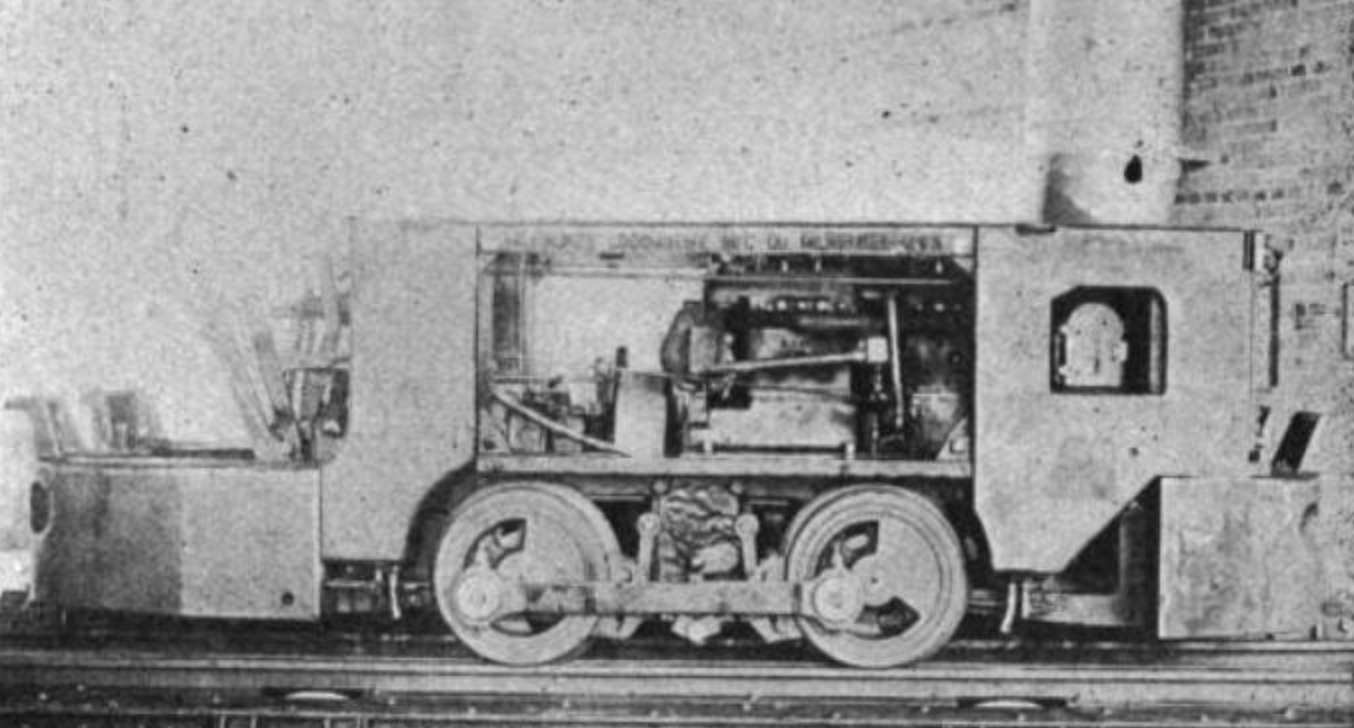
A works photograph of a Milwaukee 5 ton mining locomotive, 1914

The company was founded in October 1907, in Milwaukee, by F.P. Cook, Adolph N. Miller and William W. Plankinton. In 1908, the company leased a new factory in North Milwaukee. The company's first product was the Vanguard, a standard gauge 30 hp yard switcher.

In 1910, it supplied one of the first gasoline locomotives for use in a United States coal mine when it supplied the Midvalley Coal Company of Wilburton with one of its 9-ton Model M-4 locomotives.

Just after the First World War the company produced at least one fire truck for the Walter Company of New York.

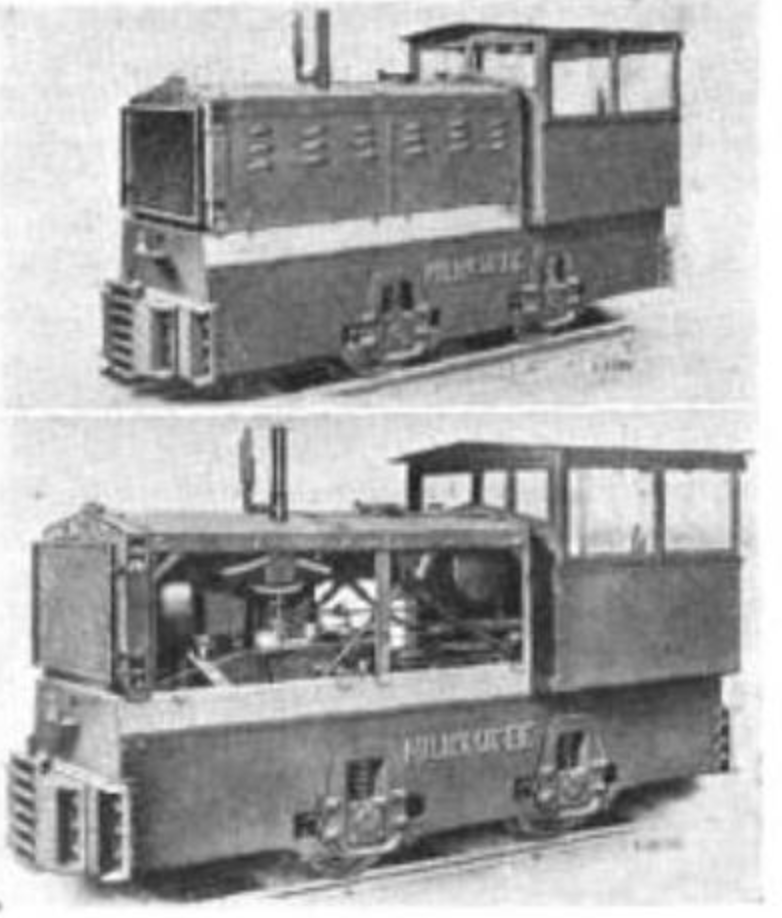
Type H locomotive, introduced in 1924

In 1924, the company introduced its Type H locomotive.

From at least 1919, the company was operated as a subsidiary of the National Brake and Electric Company of Milwaukee, itself a subsidiary of Westinghouse Air Brake Company. On 19 July 1932, the company was sold to the Geo D. Whitcomb Company where it operated as a subsidiary until 1935.

== Preservation ==
At least 8 Milwaukee locomotives are known to have been preserved:

Construction number	Model	Weight	Wheel arrangement	Build date	Gauge	Notes
391	W-10	2.5 tons	4PM		2 ft 2 in (660 mm)	The oldest Milwaukee Gasoline Locomotive in preservation located at American Industrial Mining Museum
462	L-30	6 tons	4PM		3 ft 4 in (1,016 mm)	Worked at Madrid, New Mexico,
407	L-30		4PM		2 ft (610 mm)	Worked at the Pacific Coast Borax Co.
	L-30	6 tons	4PM		3 ft (914 mm)	Located in central Pennsylvania
