= Chicago Motor Club =

American Automobile Association Chapter in Illinois

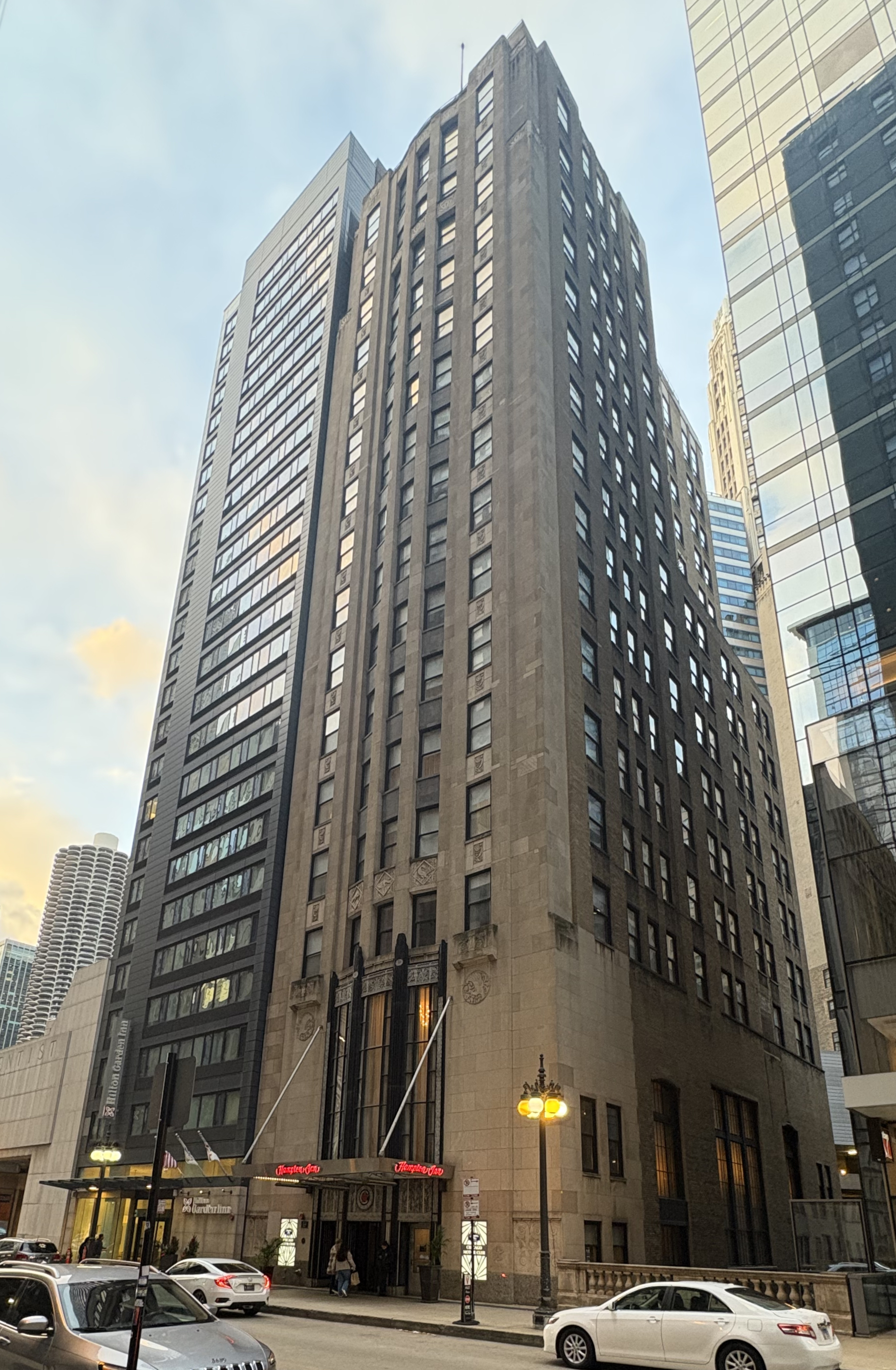
The Chicago Motor Club Building

The Chicago Motor Club, or CMC, is the local chapter of the American Automobile Association in Chicago, Illinois. The CMC sponsored the first Elgin National Road Races in 1909. Growing from concern for the well-being of students walking to school, the CMC pioneered the concept of School Safety Patrols in 1920.

Its headquarters at 68 E. Wacker Place was listed on the National Register of Historic Places in 1978 as a contributing building in the Michigan–Wacker Historic District.

== Bibliography ==
- Leviton, C. (1938) "Automobile Club Activities: The Problem from the Standpoint of the Bar", Law and Contemporary Problems. 5(1). Special edition: "The 'Unauthorized Practice of Law' Controversy", Winter. pp. 11–21.
