= Mercer (automobile) =

Defunct American motor vehicle manufacturer

Mercer Automobile Company
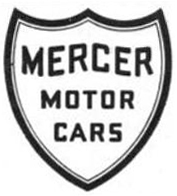
- Type: Automobile manufacturer
- Industry: Automotive
- Founded: 1909; 117 years ago
- Founder: Ferdinand Roebling, Washington A. Roebling II, John L. Kuser
- Defunct: 1925; 101 years ago
- Fate: Ceased trading
- Headquarters: Hamilton Township, Mercer County, New Jersey, United States
- Key people: C.G. Roebling, W. A. Roebling II, Findley Robertson Porter, Eric H. Delling
- Products: Automobiles; Automotive parts
- Production output: 12,893 (1910-1925)

Mercer was an American automobile manufacturer from 1909 until 1925. It was notable for its high-performance cars, especially the Type 35 Raceabout.

== History ==
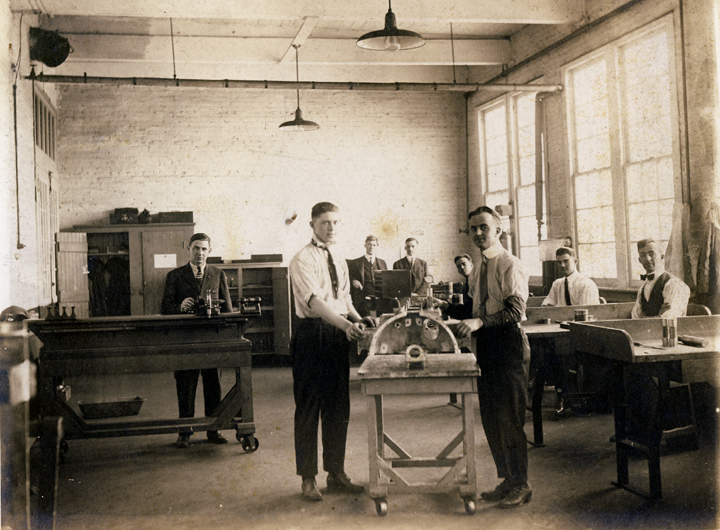
Shop foreman Harold Higgins (far left) and driver Eddie Pullen (center right) – tool room at Mercer Automobile Co., c. 1910. Photo donated by Janelle Higgins.

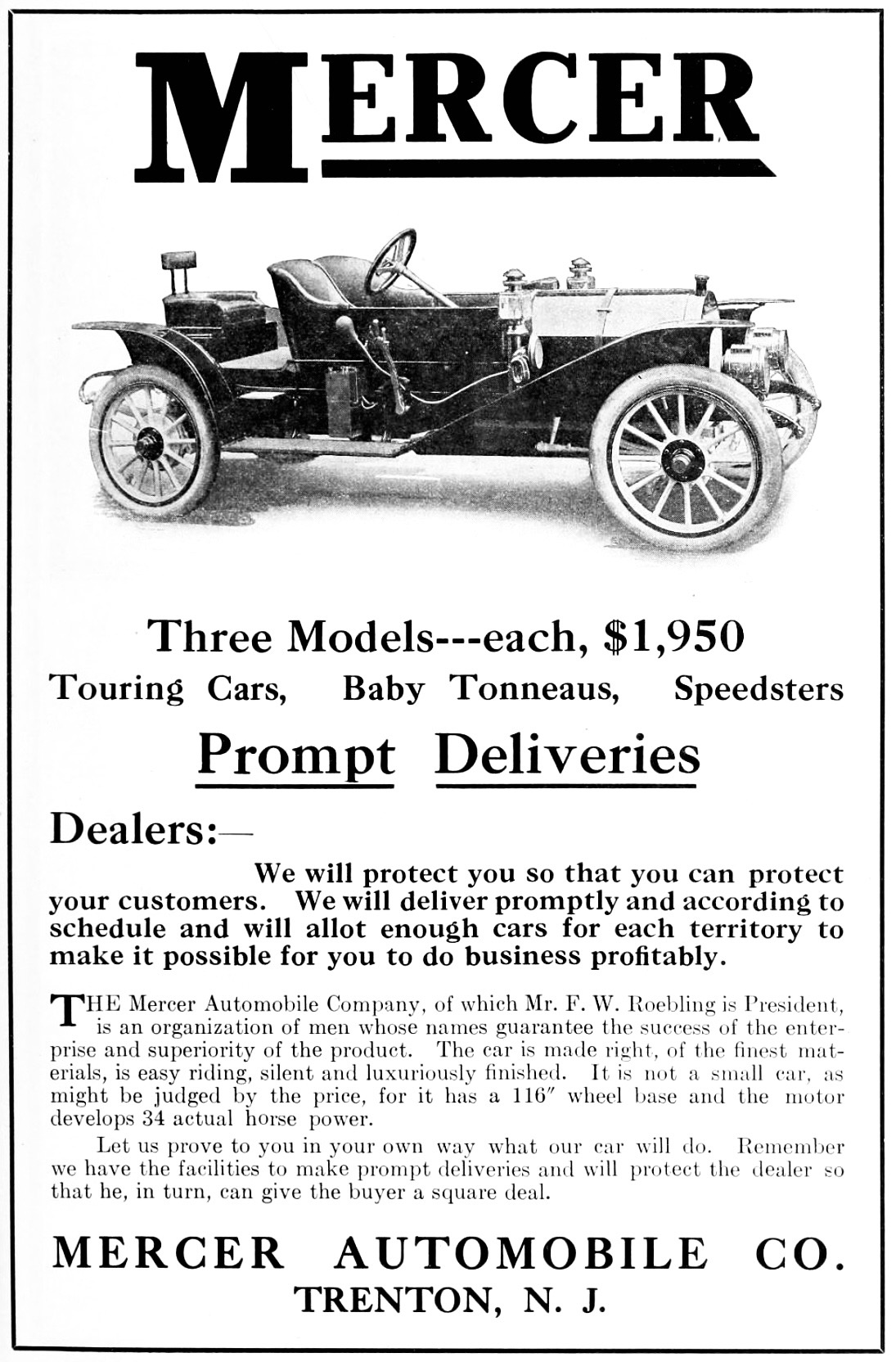
Mercer advertisement (1910)

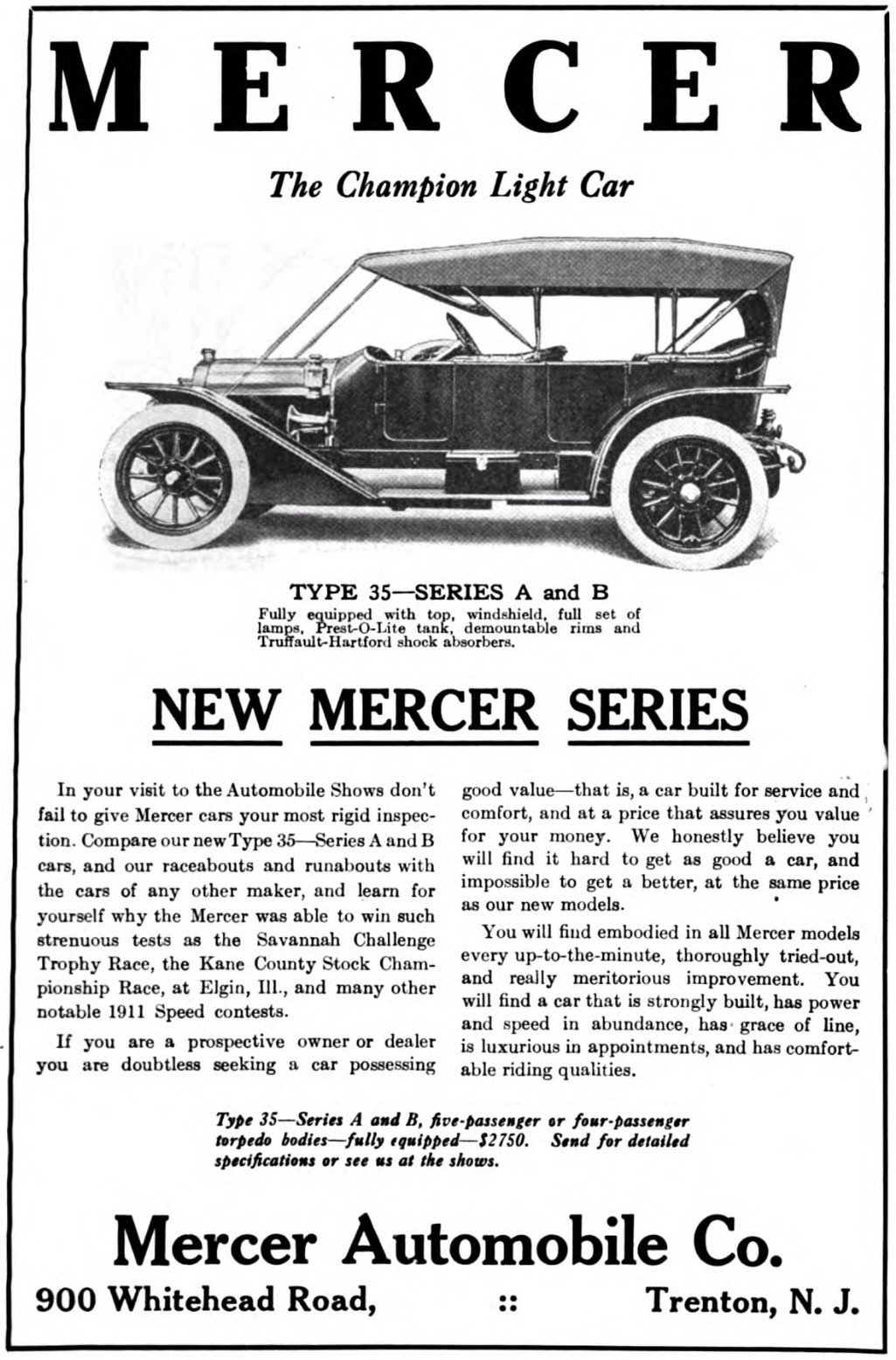
Mercer Model 35 (1911-1914)

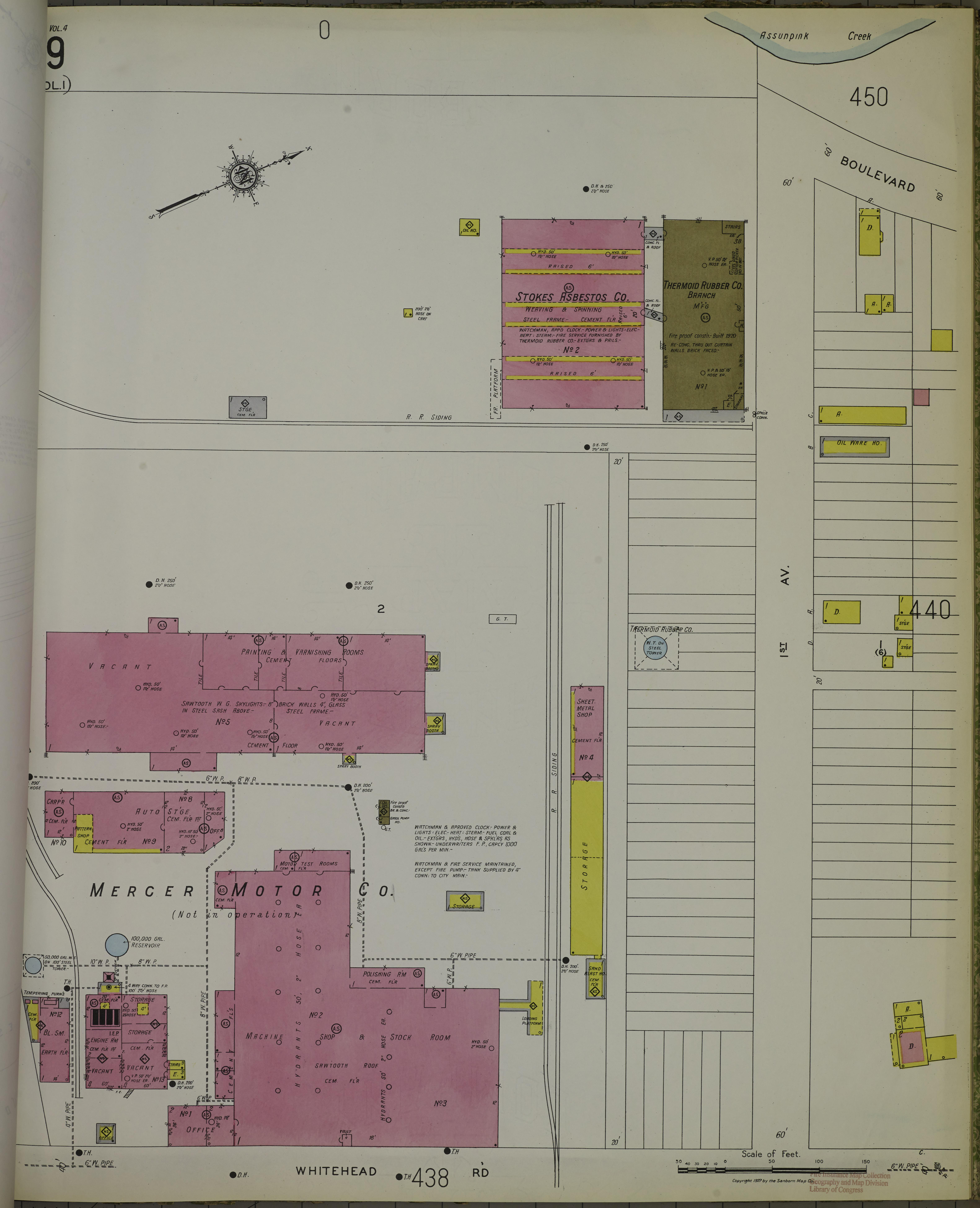
Mercer Plant (1927) Out of order since 1925

The Mercer Automobile Company was formed in May 1909 in Trenton, Mercer County, New Jersey. It evolved from the Walter Automobile Company, which had built the Walter and Roebling-Planche automobiles. Washington A. Roebling II arranged with William Walter, to take over his automobile company and use a vacant brewery in Hamilton, New Jersey, owned by the Kuser family. Ferdinand Roebling, son of John A. Roebling, was the president, and his nephew Washington became general manager. The secretary-treasurer was John L. Kuser.

The first Mercer cars arrived in 1910. A.R. Kingston, E.T. George and C.G. Roebling were credited with the design. The Mercer was available as a speedster, toy tonneau or touring car and were powered by four-cylinder L-head Beaver engines.

The T-head Raceabout was announced late in 1910 for the 1911 model year, this car was the idea of Washington A. Roebling II, and built by the engineer, Finley Robertson Porter. The Mercer T-head engine would power all Mercers through 1914.

Mercers were relatively expensive cars with a median price in 1914 of $2,500, equivalent to $80,357 in 2025. Advertisements by Mercer in 1914 included "The Mercer is the Steinway of the automobile world " and "It is possible to thread a needle while travelling 60 mph." In 1912 Washington A. Roebling II died in the disaster of the Titanic. In 1914 Finley Porter resigned and his place was taken by Eric H. Delling, who designed a new L-head engine. Like the T-head, the Mercer L-head was a four-cylinder, developing at least 70-hp.

Delling updated designs so that even sporting Mercers had windshields and bench seats. Enclosed coachwork, as well as Houdaille shock absorbers were added. Delling departed in 1916 and in 1917 F.W. Roebling died, followed the year after by C.G. Roebling. The Mercer Automobile Company lost direction and in October 1919 a Wall Street syndicate calling itself the Mercer Motors Company acquired control. Former Packard vice-president, Emlen S. Hare became president.

The new Mercer organization acquired a substantial interest in Locomobile and Simplex marques. Hare's Motors resulted from this, but by August of 1921 Hare's Motors collapsed, and control of Mercer passed back to original Mercer people including John L. Kuser.

For 1923 an overhead valve six-cylinder (Rochester engine) was introduced with a three-speed Brown & Lipe gearbox. This joined the four-speed Mercer four-cylinder and Mercers gained front brakes in 1924.

== Production models ==
- Mercer A Touring Car
- Mercer B Toy Tonneau
- Mercer C Speedster
- Mercer 35-A
- Mercer 35-B

== Gallery ==
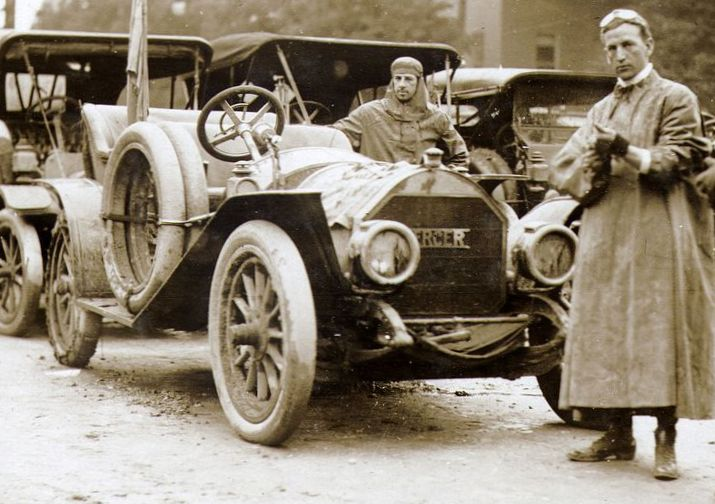
1910 Mercer Model 30

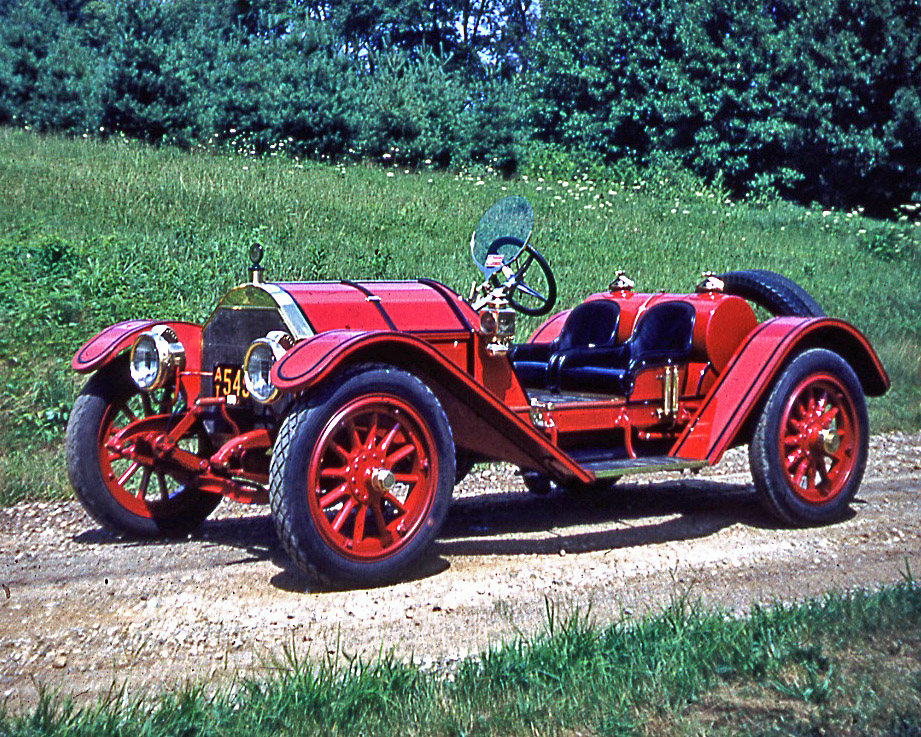
1913 Mercer Model 35-J

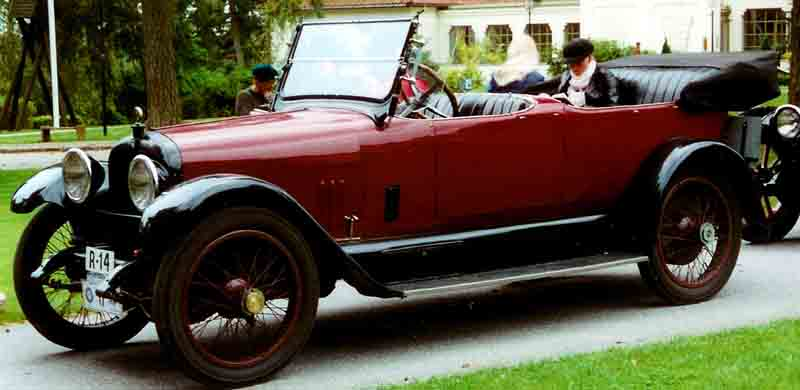
1916 Mercer Model 22-72

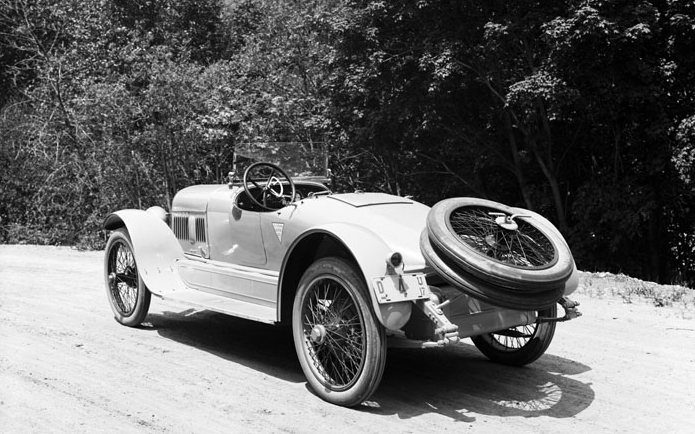
1917 Mercer Model 22-73 Raceabout

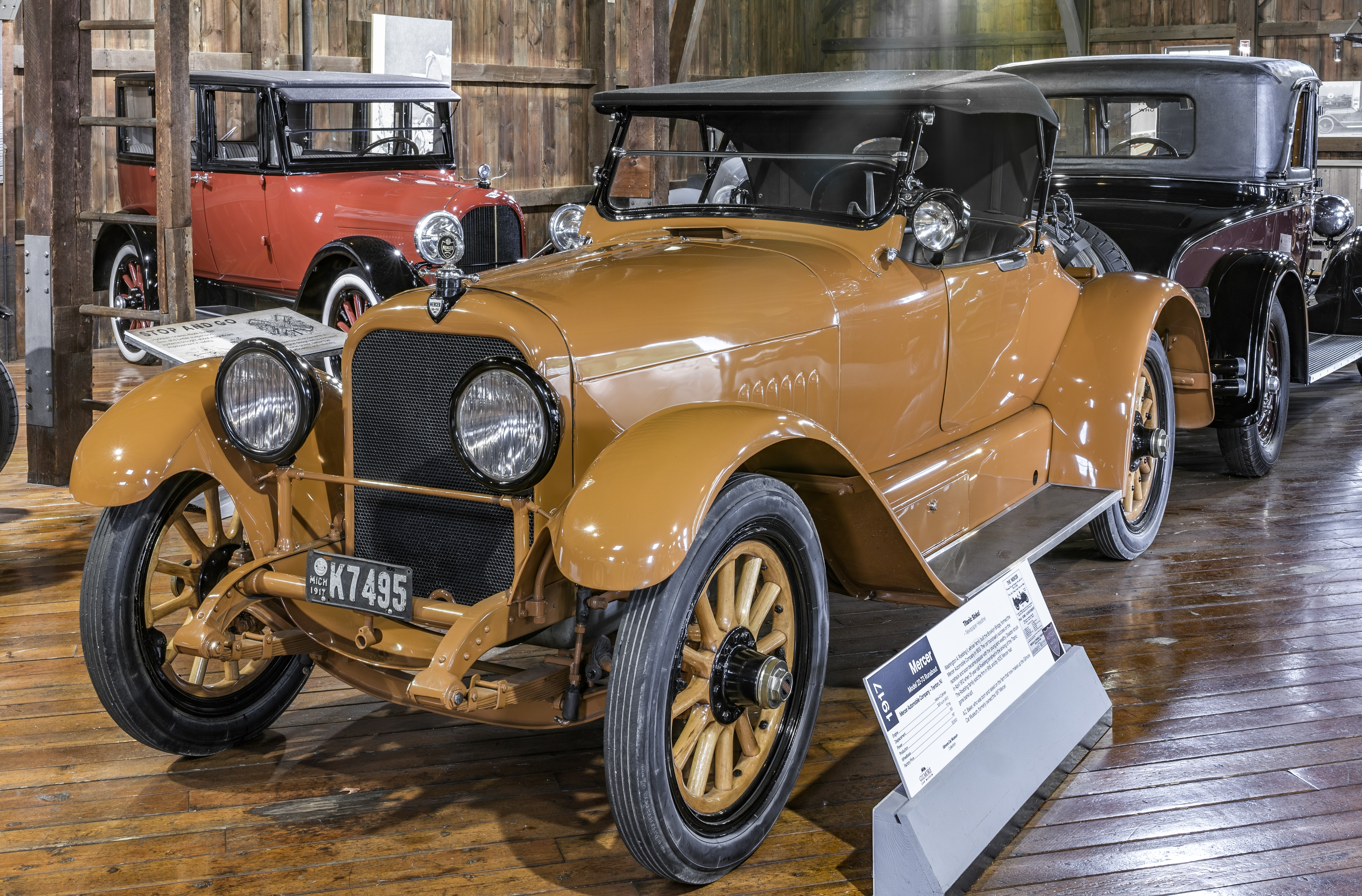
1917 Mercer Model 22-73 Runabout

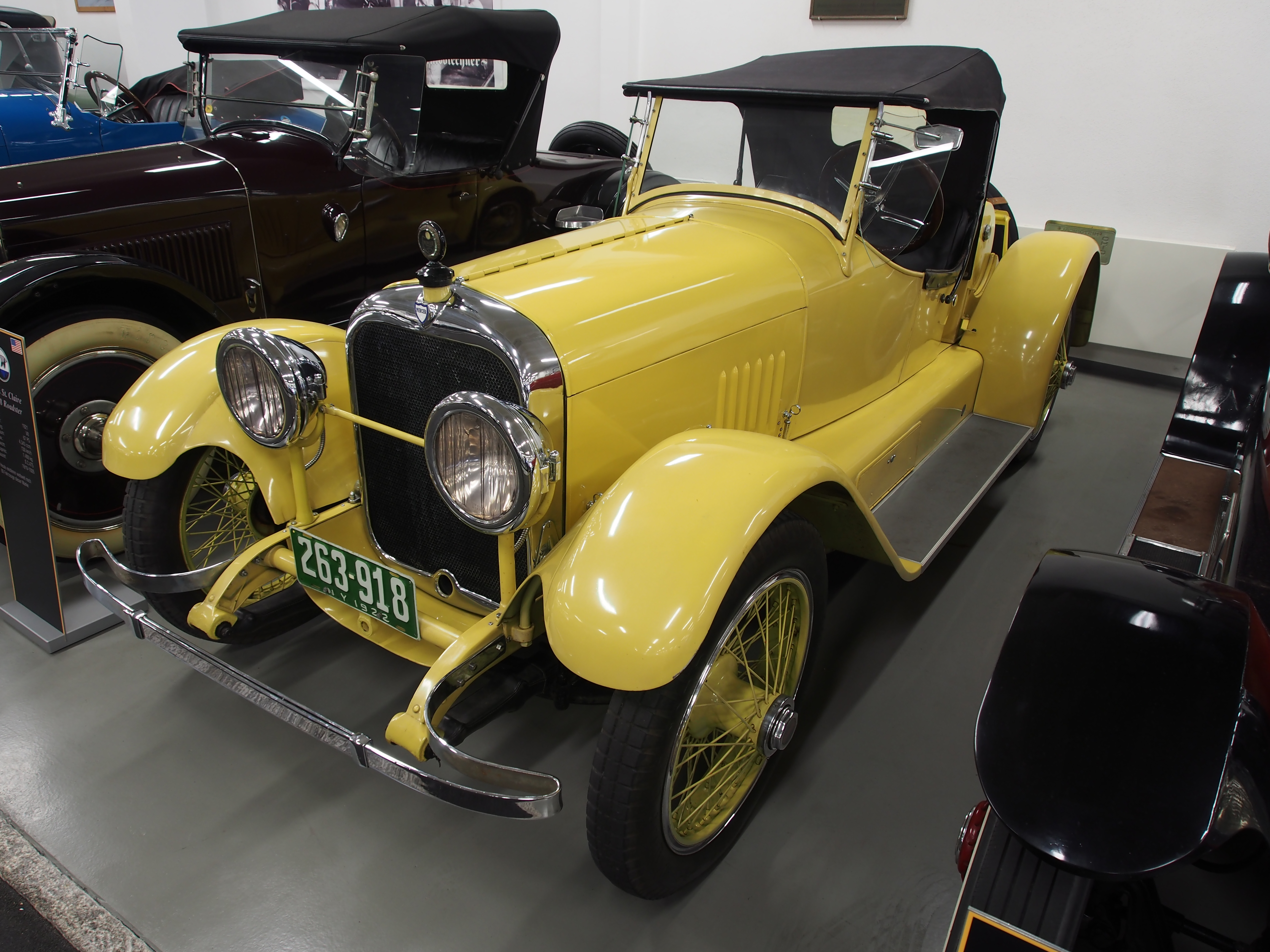
1922 Mercer Series 5 Raceabout

== Type 35R Raceabout and Racing ==
Mercer 35 Raceabout
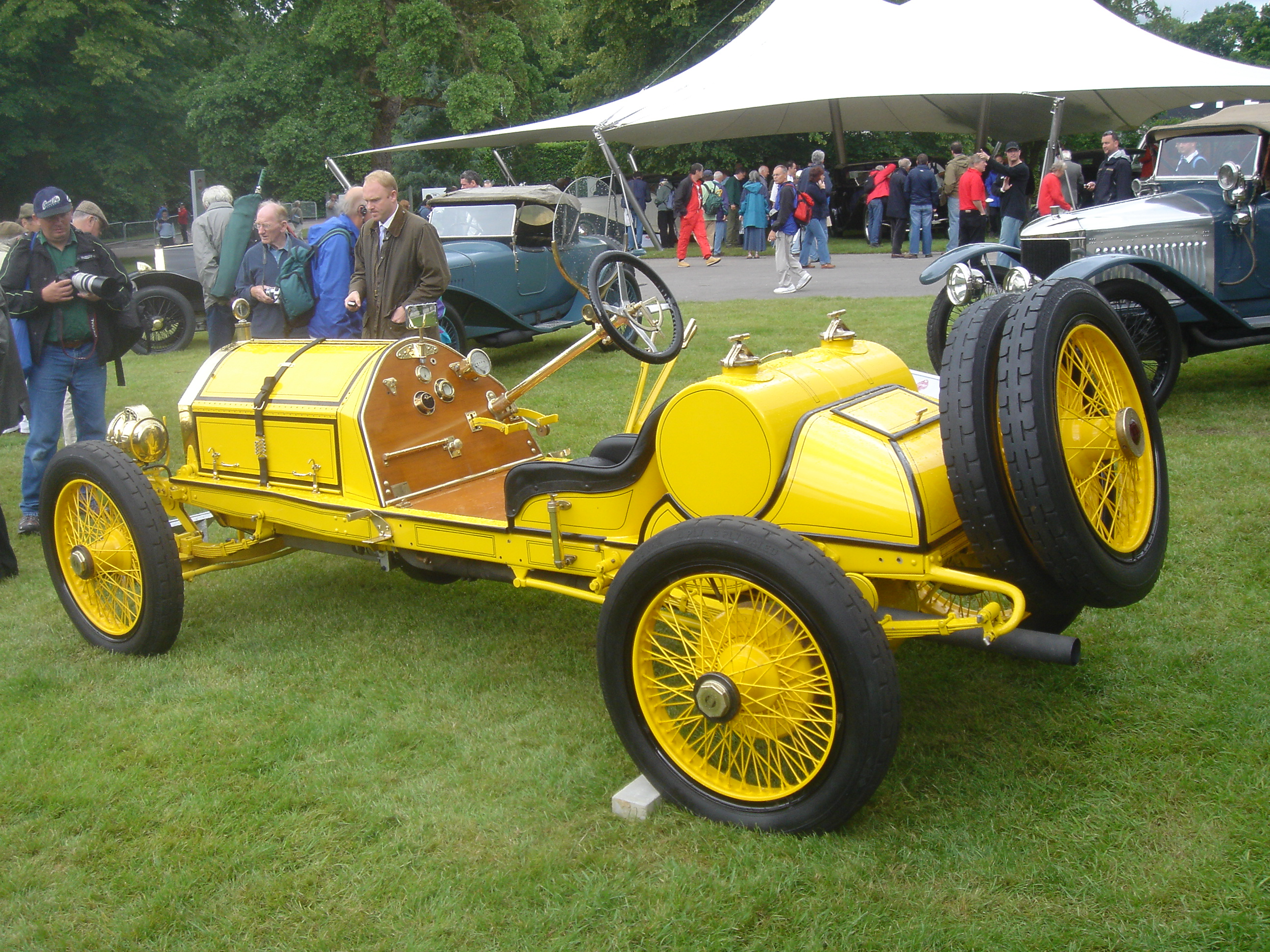
- A fenderless 1912 Mercer 35R Raceabout at the 2007 Goodwood Festival of Speed.

Overview
- Manufacturer: Mercer
- Production: 1910
- Assembly: Trenton, New Jersey
- Designer: Finley Robertson Porter

Body and chassis
- Class: sports car
- Body style: roadster
- Layout: FMR layout

Powertrain
- Engine: 293 cu in (4,800 cc) T-head inline-four engine, 55 horsepower (41 kW)
- Transmission: 3-speed manual (1911–1913); 4-speed manual (1913–1914) transmission separate from engine and from final drive

Dimensions
- Wheelbase: 108 in (2,700 mm)
- Curb weight: 2,850 lb (1,290 kg)

Chronology
- Successor: 1915 Mercer Raceabout

Developed in 1910, the 1911 Type-35R Raceabout, a stripped-down, two-seat speedster, designed to be "safely and consistently" driven at over 70 mph (110 km/h), was capable of over 90 mph (140 km/h). The Raceabout's inline 4-cylinder T-head engine displaced 293 cubic inches (4,800 cc) and developed 55 horsepower (41 kW) at 1,650 revolutions per minute.

The Mercer Type-35R won five of the six 1911 races it was entered in, losing only the first Indianapolis 500. The Raceabout became one of the premier racing cars of the era- highly coveted for its quality construction and exceptional handling.

In February 1914, Eddie Pullen, who worked at the factory from 1910, won the American Grand Prize held at Santa Monica, California, by racing for 403 mi (649 km) in a Raceabout. Later that same year, Eddie also won The Corona Road Race held in Corona, California, on November 26. For winning the 300-mile (480 km) big car event, Pullen won $4,000 and an additional $2,000 for setting a new world road race record. His average speed of 86.5 mph (139.21 km/h) broke the record of 78.72 mph (126.69 km/h) set by Teddy Tetzlaff at Santa Monica in 1912.

In the 1914 road races in Elgin, Illinois, two Raceabouts collided and wrecked. Spencer Wishart, a champion racer who always wore shirt and tie under his overalls, was killed along with the car's mechanic, John Jenter. This prompted the company to cancel its racing program.

A similar model 1913 Mercer Raceabout, known as a Model 35J, is on permanent display at the Simeone Foundation Automotive Museum in Philadelphia, PA, US.

== Fate ==
The Mercer Motors Company, then controlled by former Mercer Automobile people, sold their factory to the Roller Bearing Co. of America in 1925. All other assets were sold to Curran-McDevitt, the Philadelphia Mercer dealership. Production, which had ceased in 1924, was resumed late in the year and continued, though cars were mostly built from parts on hand. Mercer produced its last vehicles in 1925, after some 12,893 had been built.

In 1928 the dormant Mercer Motors Company was sold to a group headed by Harry M. Wahl. Wahl contracted with Elcar Motor Company and its engineer Mike Graffis to build new Mercer prototypes. Mercer Motors Corporation was incorporated on November 21, 1929. Only one Mercer was completed before the effects of the Great Depression ended production plans. This Mercer was shown at the Hotel Montclair during the January 1931 New York Automobile Show and is still extant.

== See also ==
- Mercer - Classic Car History
- American Archetype article at Hemmings
- Mercer Cars at ConceptCarz.com
