= Commonwealth (automobile company) =

Defunct American motor vehicle manufacturer

1921 Commonwealth Touring

The Commonwealth Motors Corporation was a luxury auto company that produced cars from 1917 to 1922. The company was founded in Chicago as Partin-Palmer company in 1913, but in 1915 got into financial trouble. In 1917, the name was changed to Commonwealth, and production was moved to Joliet, Illinois.

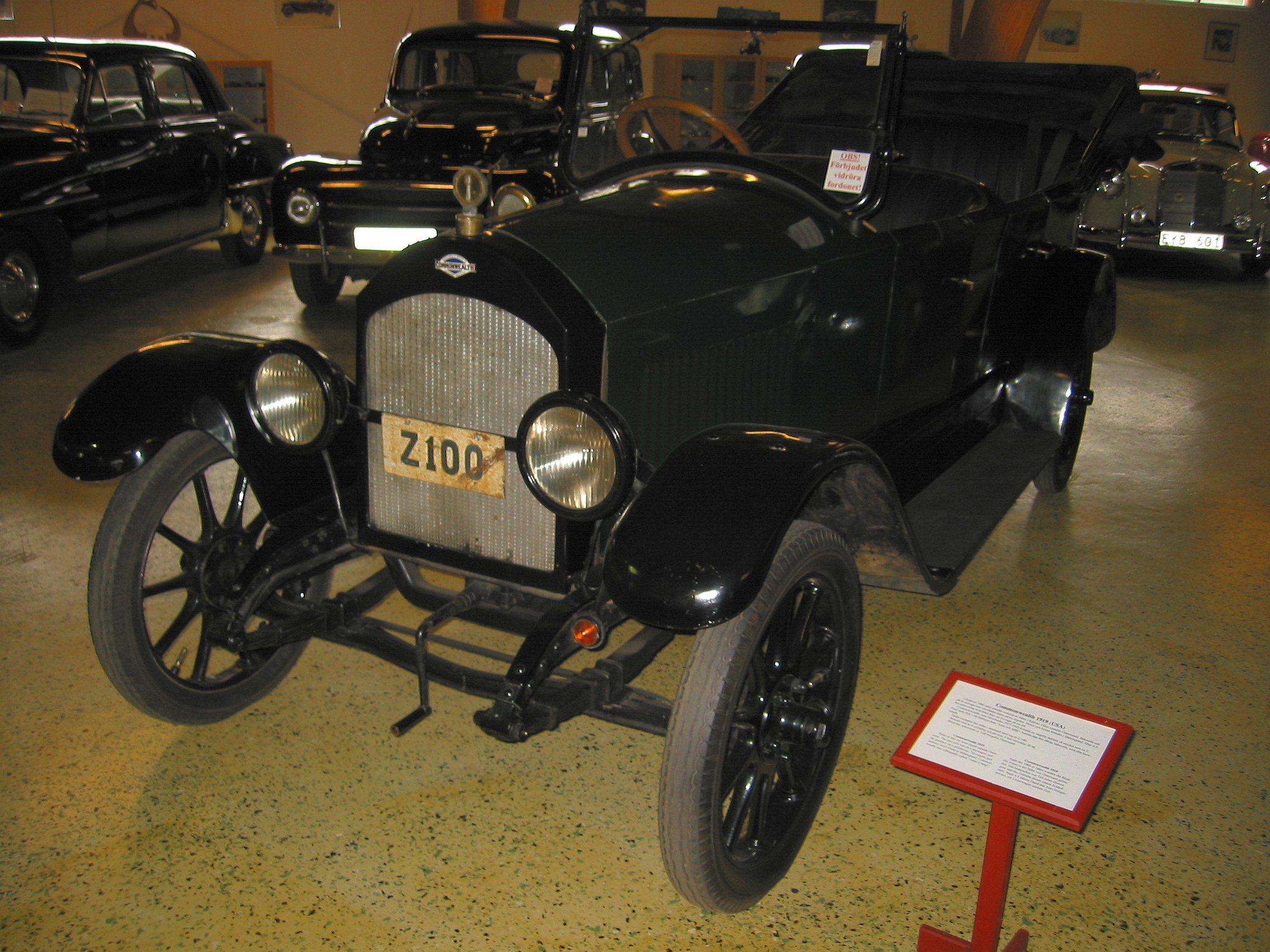
1919 touring car, Ivars Bilmuseum, Sweden

== Overview ==
The slogan of the company was "The Car with a foundation", which was in reference to the build quality, including such parts as the frames lined with thick felt to prevent squeaks, chrome nickel alloy steel, and five-inch channel sections. The company produced four passenger open cars and five passenger closed-body cars. In 1919, the company tried a six-cylinder car with 25.3 hp called the Victory Six Tour.

== Company failure ==
Morris Markin took over management of Commonwealth Motors in the fall of 1921. In November, Markin hired Leland Goodspeed, who joined Commonwealth as the new Vice President of Engineering with the intent of developing a new line of cars. Goodspeed was the former EVP of Barley Motors in Kalamazoo Michigan. At Roamer he was credited with the design and execution of the high end Roamer luxury roadsters and phaetons produced by Barley Motors. Hired on with Commonwealth, the plan was to design and produced a new high end closed-body car to be called "Goodspeed". Leland Goodspeed was known within the automobile race community having broken two Indianapolis 500 speed records: one in 1919 and one in 1921, both driving Roamers, so his brand name was very strong. Three aluminum-bodied prototypes were produced and displayed at New York and Chicago auto shows during the 1922 show car season. Despite positive feedback from the show, the Goodspeed was never put into production.

== Checker Cab Manufacturing Company ==
In the spring of 1922, Morris Markin, owner of both Markin Auto Body (Commonwealth supplier) and a minority owner of Checker Taxi of Chicago, a taxicab co-op (Commonwealth customer), consolidated all production into the Checker Cab Manufacturing Company and moved production to Kalamazoo, Michigan and suspended all Commonwealth auto production. The new reorganized company continued producing Checker cabs until 1982, operating from 1958 as Checker Motors Corporation. Checker Motors continued producing components for GM and Chrysler until the 2009 failures of both companies. Unable to survive the financial turmoil, Checker Motors closed its doors in 2010.

== Models ==
- 1917-1918 Commonwealth HP: 19.6 Wheelbase: 112 inches
- 1919 Commonwealth HP: 19.6 Wheelbase: 115 inches
- 1919 Commonwealth Victory Six Tour HP: 25.3 Wheelbase: 115 inches
- 1920 Commonwealth Model 4-40 Cylinders: four HP: 35 Wheelbase: 117 inches
- 1921-1922 Commonwealth Model 4-35 Cylinders: four HP: 37 Wheelbase: 117 inches
- 1919-22 Commonwealth Mogul Cheker Taxicab Cylinders: four HP: 21.03 Transmission: selective sliding 3-speed Voltage: six to eight Wheelbase: 117 inches
