= American Chocolate =

Defunct American motor vehicle manufacturer

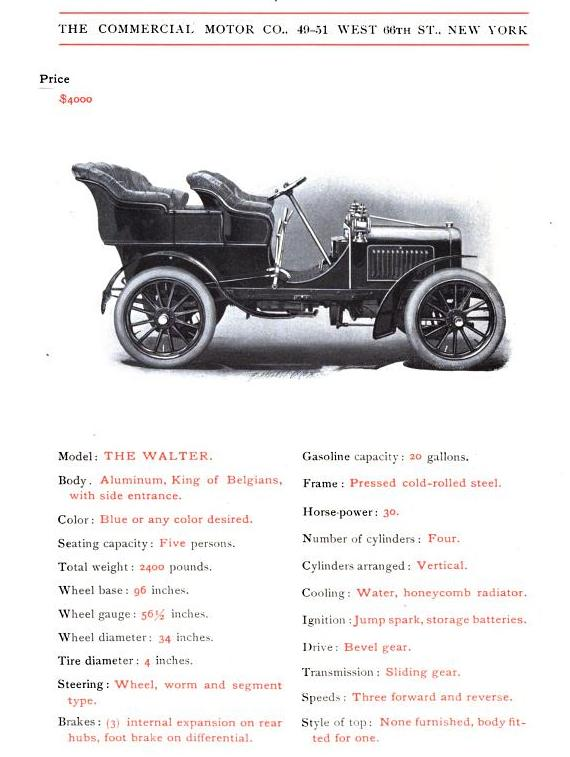
1905 Walter. The Commercial Motor Co.

The American Chocolate, later known as the Walter, was an American automobile manufactured from 1902 to 1906 by vending machine company American Chocolate Machinery Co. in Manhattan, New York. He decided to expand his business by assembling automobiles in his factory. The cars were exhibited at the New York automobile show.

The cars were built from imported components, and were 30, 40, and 50 hp models. Production was supervised by Swiss engineer William Walter, who began building cars in 1898. In 1904 the Commercial Motor Car Co. took over car production from American Chocolate Machinery Co for the Walter Brand. The company relocated to Trenton, New Jersey in 1906.

After 1910 Walter was building 4 X 4 trucks, which were used by the military and municipalities. Just after World War I, Walter sub-contracted some production of its trucks to the Milwaukee Locomotive Manufacturing Company. After that, Walter switched from the brand's own four-cylinder motor to the Waukesha engine, and the company moved to a new location on Long Island in 1923. The company would be finally absorbed by Kovatch Mobile Equipment Corp (KME) in the late 1970s.

== Models ==
Year	Engine	Horsepower	Transmission	Wheelbase
1902	2-cylinder	12	N/A	N/A
1903	2-cylinder	12	3-speed manual	N/A
1903	4-cylinder	24	3-speed manual	N/A
1906	4-cylinder	30	3-speed manual	110 in (280 cm)
1906	4-cylinder	40	3-speed manual	110 in (280 cm)
1906	4-cylinder	50	3-speed manual	122 in (310 cm)

== Notes ==
- Lewerenz, Alfred (1973). "The American Chocolate Company - a bit od history". Horseless Carriage Gazette. 35–36: 30.
- "Image of a 1902 Waltomobile Tonneau". American Chocolate Machinery Co. Archived from the original on 2015-11-27.
- "The 1904 Walter Gasoline Car". Cycle and Automobile Trade Journal. 8 (7): 112. 1 January 1904.
