= Staver =

Defunct American motor vehicle manufacturer

Staver Carriage Company
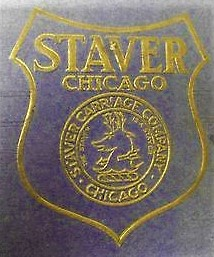
- 1912 Staver-Chicago emblem from brochure

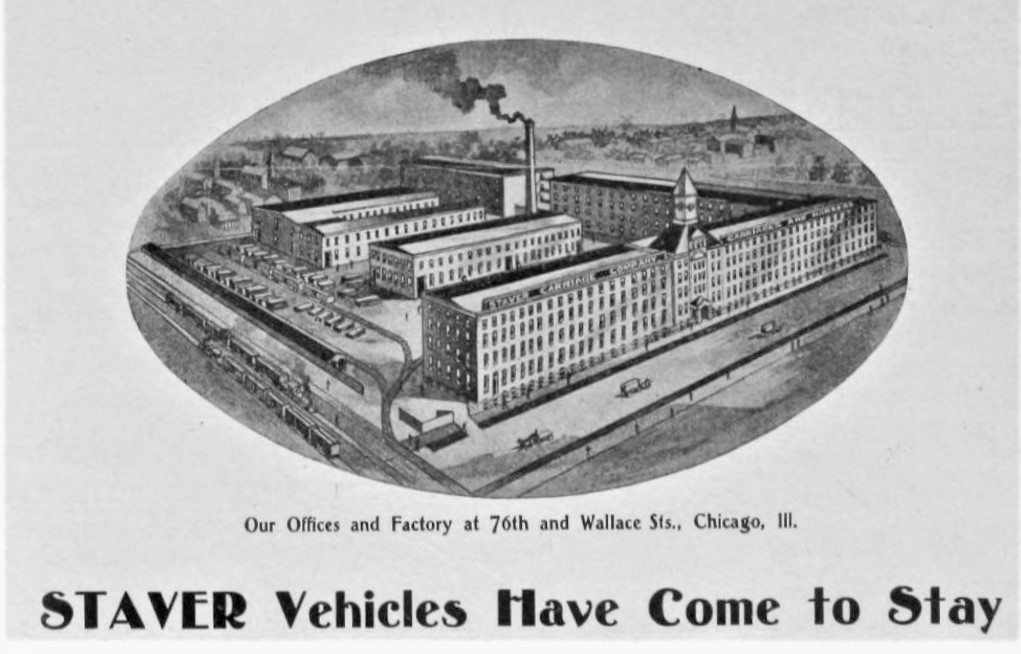
- Staver factory in 1905 from advertisement
- Industry: Coachbuilder, Automotive
- Founded: 1899; 127 years ago
- Founder: Henry C. Staver
- Defunct: 1914; 112 years ago
- Fate: Closed
- Headquarters: Chicago, Illinois, United States
- Key people: Henry C. Staver, Harry B. Staver, Dan C. Teetor
- Products: automobiles
- Production output: 7,092 (1906-1914)

The Staver and Staver-Chicago was an American Brass Era automobile manufactured at 76th and Wallace Streets in Chicago, Illinois, by the Staver Carriage Company from 1906 until 1914.

== History ==
Staver Carriage Company was organized after the 1896 bankruptcy of the Staver-Abbott Carriage Company, by Henry C. Staver in 1899. In 1905 Staver began an expansion of their carriage factory and also began developing a high-wheel automobile that would be introduced in late 1906. Henry C. Staver died in 1907 and his son Harry B. Staver became president of Staver Carriage Company.

The company's initial Staver automobile was an 18/20-hp high wheeler, with a stanhope body. Larger, more powerful and more expensive at $1,000 (equivalent to $34,554 in 2025) than most high-wheelers, it was fully equipped with top, side curtains, storm front, lights and toolbox. As Models C and D, it debuted at the 1907 Chicago Auto Show and approximately 200 were sold into 1908.

Production was turned over to conventional automobiles with a two-cylinder 20-hp roadster in 1909 and four-cylinder models beginning in 1910. Staver purchased 500 American & British Manufacturing Company four-cylinder engines designed by Charles F. Herreshoff. Poor manufacturing resulted in a lawsuit that lasted until 1914. Teetor engines from the Light Inspection Car Company designed for Staver, were used from 1910. In 1912, Dan C. Teetor became chief designer for Staver until 1914.

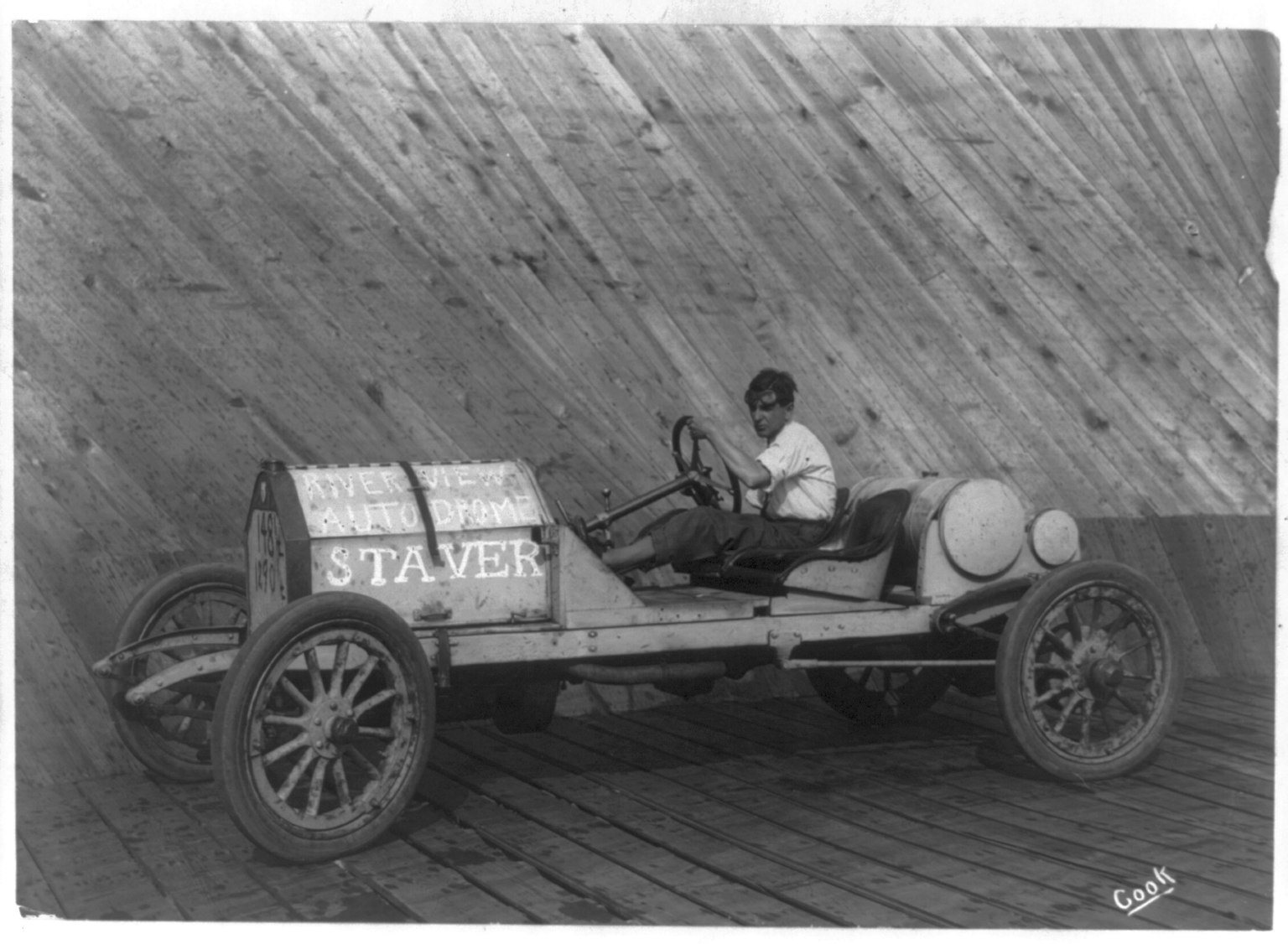
Harry L. Curran in a Staver automobile in the autodrome at Riverview Exposition, Chicago

With the introduction of the 4-cylinder automobiles, Staver's were advertised as Staver-Chicago models. Staver became very active in motorsports and reliability runs and participated in the Elgin National Road Races, Algonquin Hill Climb, Chicago's 1,400 mile Reliability Run, many board races and culminating in the Around Lake Michigan runs in 1911 and 1912. Gus Monckmeier, Chester Cheney, Emery Knudsen, Harry L. Curran and Ralph Ireland were all drivers for Staver. Ralph Ireland died in a practice run when his Staver-Chicago burst a tire at Elgin. Munckmeier had a perfect score for Staver in the 1911 Around Lake Michigan trial, but was later suspended along with Staver from AAA events for a year, when it was found the winning Staver-Chicago car was not stock.

For 1912 Staver-Chicago was dropped and all cars were again advertised as Staver. Staver's were mid-priced in the $1,650 to $2,250 (between $55,047 and $75,065 in 2025) range with limousines priced up to $3,500 (equivalent to $116,767 in 2025).

1914 Models were introduced early in March 1913 and included the new six-cylinder Staver of 70-hp, priced as a touring car at $2,750, equivalent to $89,583 in 2025. Production for cars ended in June 1914, and carriages later in the year. Staver Carriage Company continued as a property company for a few years, leasing the Staver factory to Partin Manufacturing Company and other automobile manufacturers. The factory and automobile equipment transferred to Studebaker in 1917 in a property swap.

== Models ==
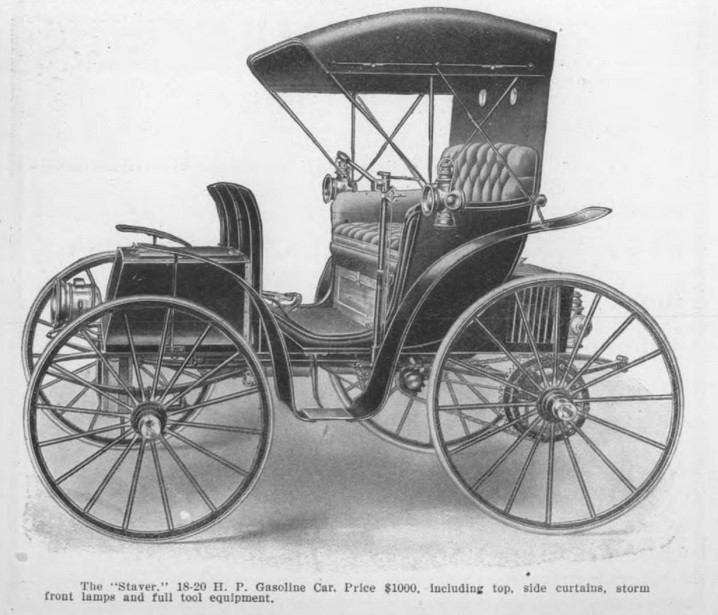
1906 Staver 18/20-hp Model D

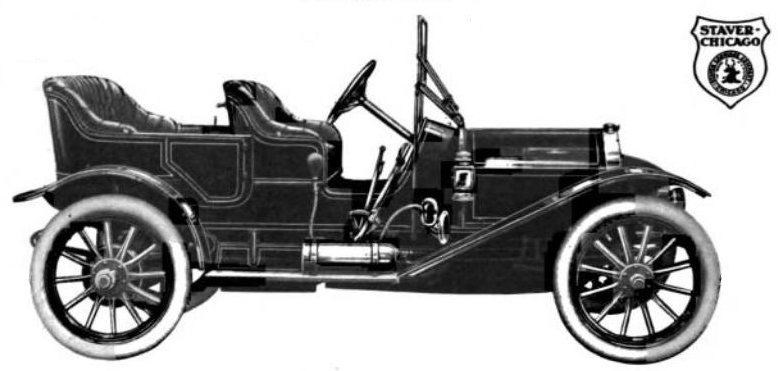
1911 Staver-Chicago 30-hp Model T

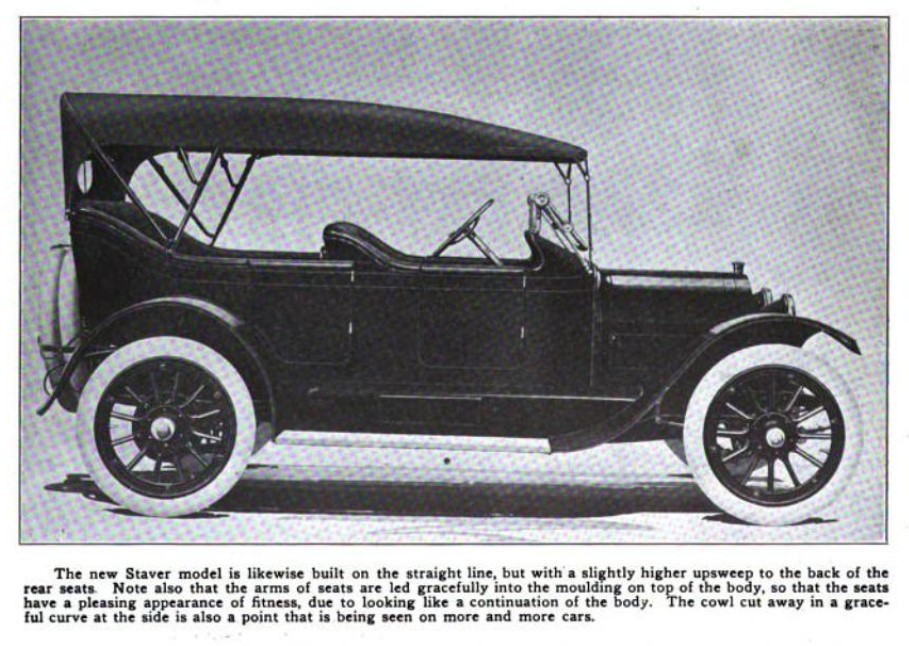
1913 Staver 35-hp Inglewood Touring Car

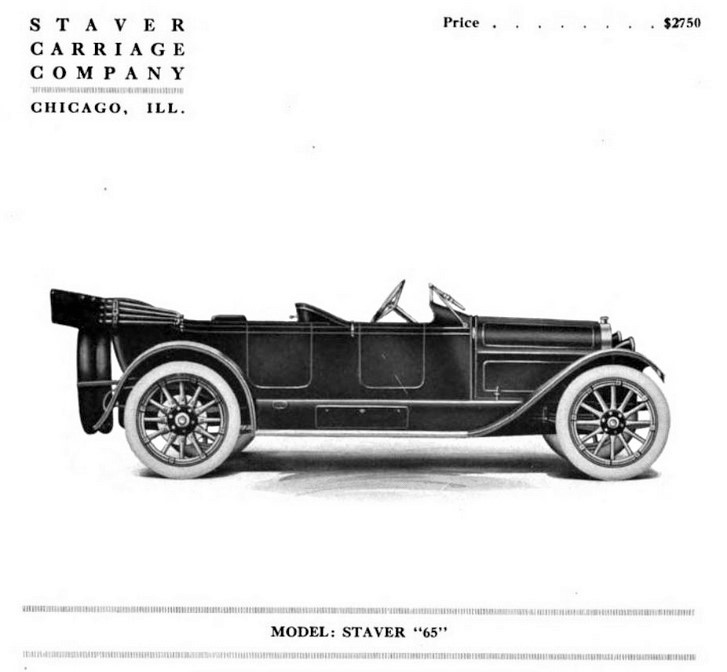
1914 Staver 70-hp Model 65 Touring car

Year	model	style	cylinder	Power (hp)	Wheelbase (in)	Body
1907-1908	Model D		2	18/20	78	Stanhope buggy 2 seater
1909	Style 20		2	24	86	Runabout 2-seater
1910	30 HP	Model H	4	30	112	Touring car 5-seater
1910	30 HP	Model I	4	30	112	Torpedo 5 seater
1910	30 HP	Model J	4	30	112	Surrey 4 seater
1910	30 HP	Model K	4	30	112	Baby tonneau 4-seater
1910	45 HP	Model L	4	45	116	runabout
1910	45 HP	Model M	4	45	117	touring car
1911	30 HP	Model B	4	30	112	Baby tonneau 4-seater
1911	30 HP	Model F	4	30	112	Fore-Door Touring Car 5 seater
1911	30 HP	Model R	4	30	112	Torpedo Roadster 5 seater
1911	30 HP	Model RR	4	30	112	Racing roadster 2 seater
1911	30 HP	Model T	4	30	112	Touring car 5-seater
1911	35 HP	Model I	4	35	112	roadster
1911	35 HP	Model I	4	35	117	5-seater touring car, 5-seater fore-door touring car
1911	40 HP	Model R	4	40	124	7-seater touring car, 7-seater fore-door touring car, coupé, sedan
1912	35 HP	Model B	4	35	112	Fore-Door Touring Car 5 seater
1912	35 HP	Model B.T	4	35	112	Baby tonneau 4-seater
1912	35 HP	Model C	4	35	112	Coupe
1912	35 HP	Model D	4	35	112	limousine
1912	35 HP	Model F	4	35	120	Fore-Door Touring Car, Special
1912	35 HP	Model R	4	35	112	Torpedo Roadster 5 seats
1912	35 HP	Model RR	4	35	112	Racing roadster 2 seater
1912	40 HP	Model F	4	40	124	Fore Door Touring Car
1912	40 HP	Model L	4	40	124	limousine
1912	40 HP	Model RR	4	40	124	Racing roadster 2 seater
1912	40 HP	Model T	4	40	124	Touring cars 5-seater and 7-seater
1913	30 HP		4	30	120	Algonquin Speed Roadster
1913	35 HP		4	35	124	Englewood Touring Car 5-seat, Englewood Limited Touring Car 5-seat, Edgewater Touring Car 5-seat, Newport Touring Car 5-seat, Greyhound Speed Roadster 4-seat, Beverly Touring Car 5-seat, Berkley Tonneau 4-seat, Lakeport Roadster, South Shore Colonial Coupe, North Shore Sedan
1913	40 HP		4	40	124	Dictator touring car 5-seater
1914	45 HP	Model 45	4	45	118	5-seater touring car, 2-seater roadster
1914	55 HP	Model 55	4	55	120	Touring car 5-seater, Speedster 2-seater
1914	65 HP	Model 65	6	70	138	Touring cars 5-seater and 7-seater

== Production ==
Production figures total 7,092 vehicles.

Year	production
1907	213
1908	374
1909	426
1910	816
1911	1,110
1912	1,316
1913	1,410
1914	1,427
total	7,092

About five Staver vehicles still exist.

== Advertisements ==
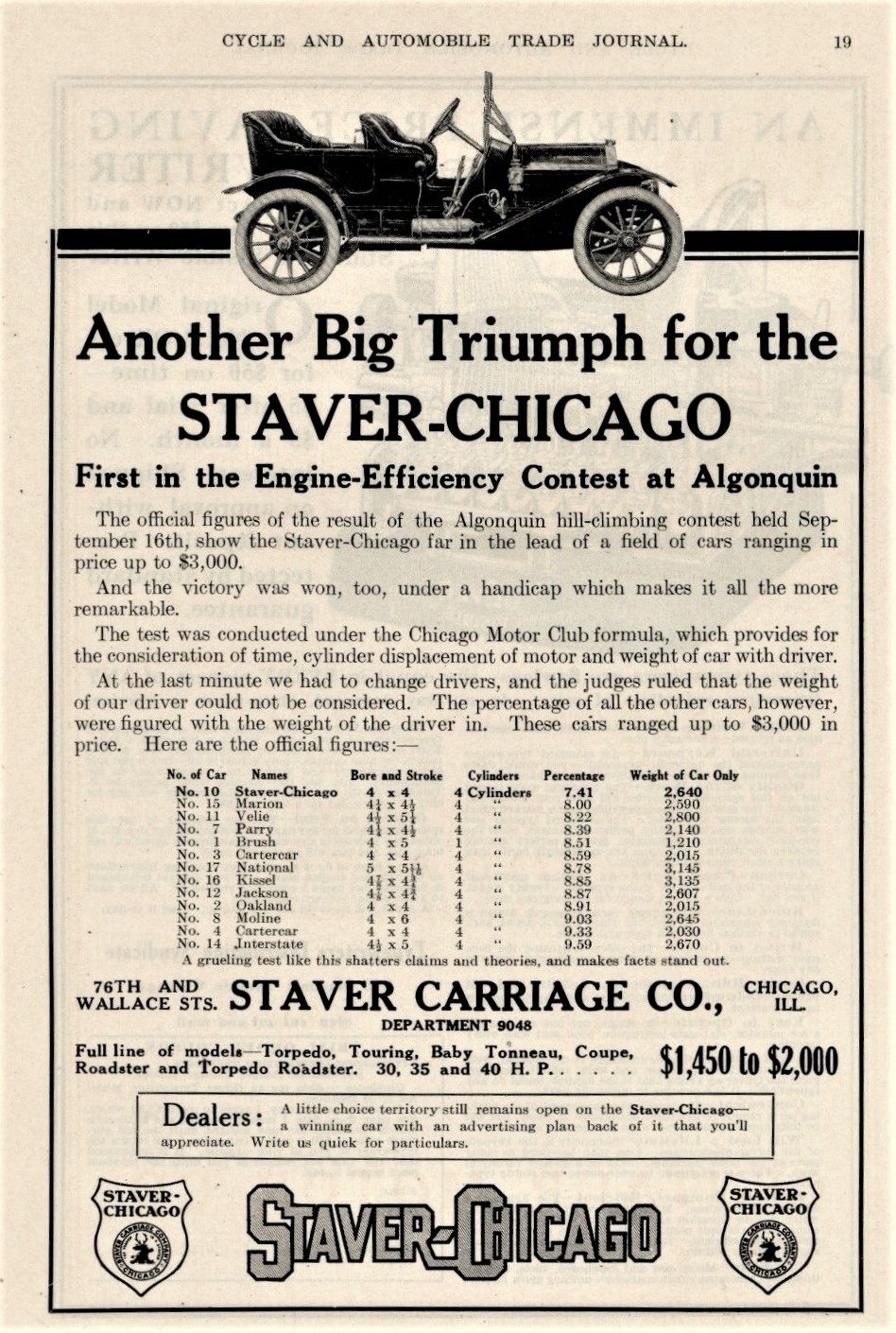
1910 Staver-Chicago advertisement in Cycle and Automobile Trade Journal

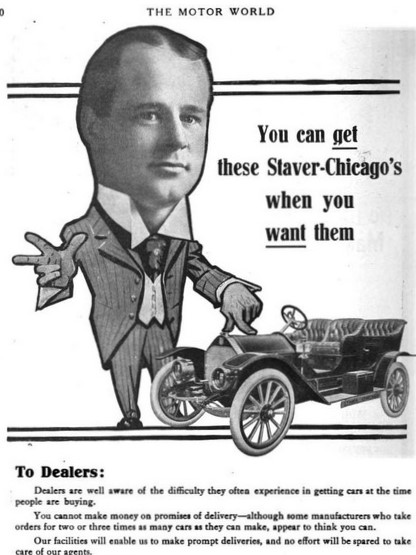
1911 Staver-Chicago advertisement with Harry B. Staver in Motor World

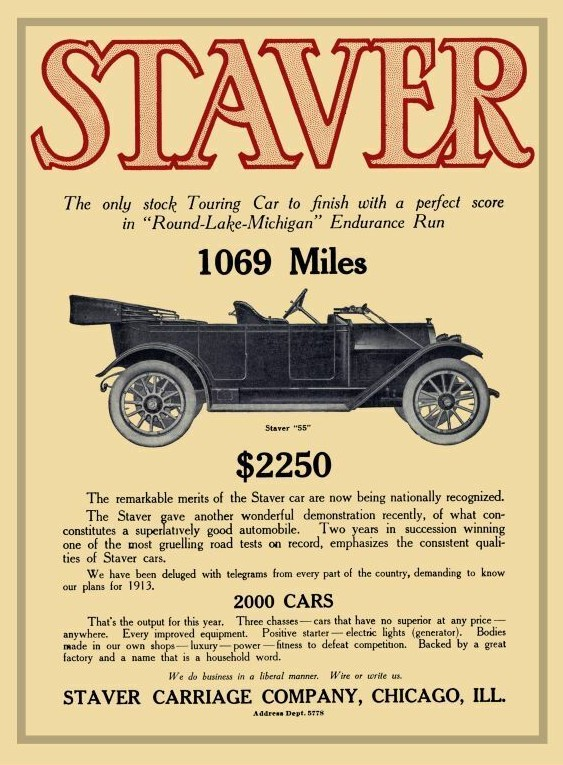
1912 Staver advertisement in Motor Field
