= Automotive Industries (magazine) =

Trade magazine

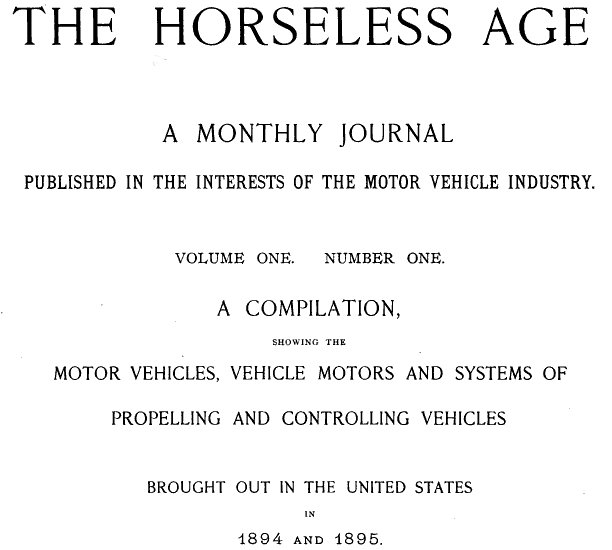
- The Horseless Age, volume 1, no. 1
- Categories: Trade magazine
- Frequency: Monthly
- First issue: November 1895
- Company: Automotive Industries Ltd.
- Country: USA
- Based in: Versailles, Kentucky
- Language: English
- Website: www.ai-online.com
- ISSN: 1099-4130

Automotive Industries (AI) is one of the world's oldest continually published trade publications and the oldest specialising in the automaking business.

== History ==
The magazine was founded in November 1895 as The Horseless Age, the second magazine created to cover the world's transition from horse-drawn conveyances to those powered by the new internal combustion engine.

The magazine changed its name to The Automobile in July 1909, an era when gasoline, steam and electricity all vied for pre-eminence in motive power.

The magazine's present name was established in November 1917. The title was briefly amended to Automotive and Aviation Industries during the World War II years, as the magazine expanded its coverage of technologies and production methods to include the aircraft industry, in which many automakers participated.

== See also ==
- Green Car Journal
