= Robert Evans (racing driver) =

American racing driver (1890–1971)

- Born: April 19, 1890 Lawrenceville, Illinois, U.S.
- Died: c. 1971 (aged 80–81)

Champ Car career
- 2 races run over 2 years
- First race: 1912 Chanslor & Lyon Trophy (Santa Monica)
- Last race: 1913 Indianapolis 500 (Indianapolis)
Wins	Podiums	Poles
0	1	0

Robert Evans (April 19, 1890 – c. 1971) was an American racing driver. He drove relief for Jack Tower during the 1911 Indianapolis 500, then made a Championship Car race start on the Santa Monica Road Race Course in 1912, finishing second. Evans then drove in the 1913 Indianapolis 500, which would be his final Indy car race.

== Motorsports career results ==
=== Indianapolis 500 results ===
Year	Car	Start	Qual	Rank	Finish	Laps	Led	Retired
1913	5	4	82.010	12	13	158	2	Clutch
Totals						158	2	

Starts	1
Poles	0
Front Row	0
Wins	0
Top 5	0
Top 10	0
Retired	1
