= Théodore Pilette =

Belgian racing driver (1883–1921)

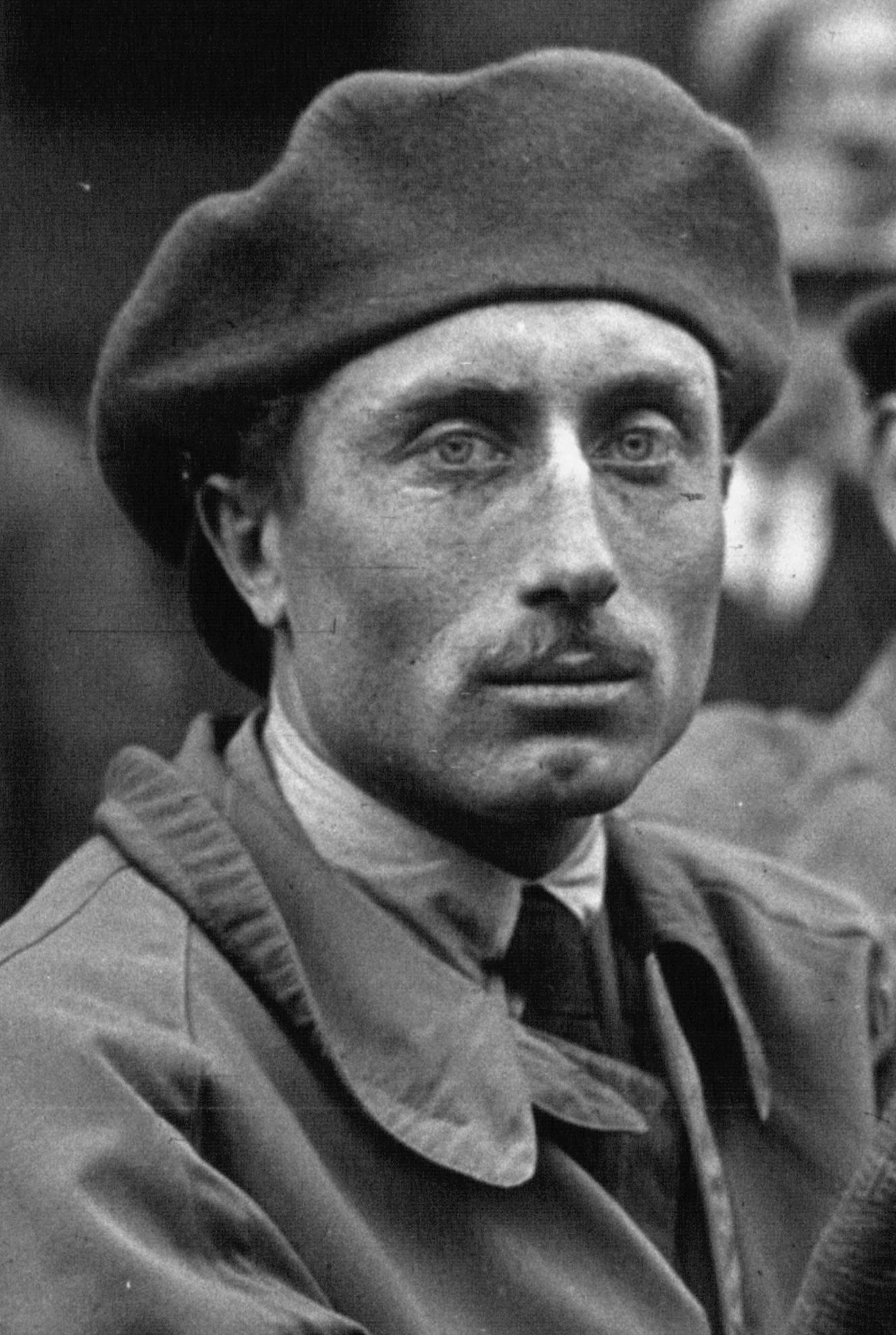
- Pilette in 1914
- Born: Théodore Eugène Pilette; 8 September 1883 Saint-Gilles, Brussels, Belgium
- Died: 13 May 1921 (aged 37) Steinfort, Capellen, Luxembourg

Champ Car career
- 1 race run over 1 year
- First race: 1913 Indianapolis 500 (Indianapolis)
Wins	Podiums	Poles
0	0	0

Théodore Eugène Pilette (8 September 1883 – 13 May 1921) was a Belgian racing driver and businessman. He started racing in 1903.

Pilette was the importer in Belgium for Bugatti and Mercedes, the brand of Daimler Motoren Gesellschaft. His concession, Etablissements Pilette, was located Rue Veydt in Brussels.

Pilette was the first Belgian to race at the Indianapolis 500, competing in the 1913 event with his works Mercedes-Knight, Pilette was among the first Europe-based drivers to travel from overseas for the race. Despite having the smallest engine, he took fifth place, averaging 68.148 mph (109.674 km/h) over the 500 miles (800 km).

In the 1914 French Grand Prix won 1-2-3 by Mercedes, he drove one of two additional Mercedes that did not finish.

Pilette died on his way back from the Stuttgart Mercedes factory in a road accident near Capellen with his mechanic, Bruyère. He was the father of auto racer André Pilette, and grandfather of racer Teddy Pilette.

== Motorsports career results ==
=== Indianapolis 500 results ===
Year	Car	Start	Qual	Rank	Finish	Laps	Led	Retired
1913	23	13	75.520	27	5	200	0	Running
Totals						200	0	

Starts	1
Poles	0
Front Row	0
Wins	0
Top 5	1
Top 10	1
Retired	0
