= Joe Nikrent =

American racing driver (1879–1958)

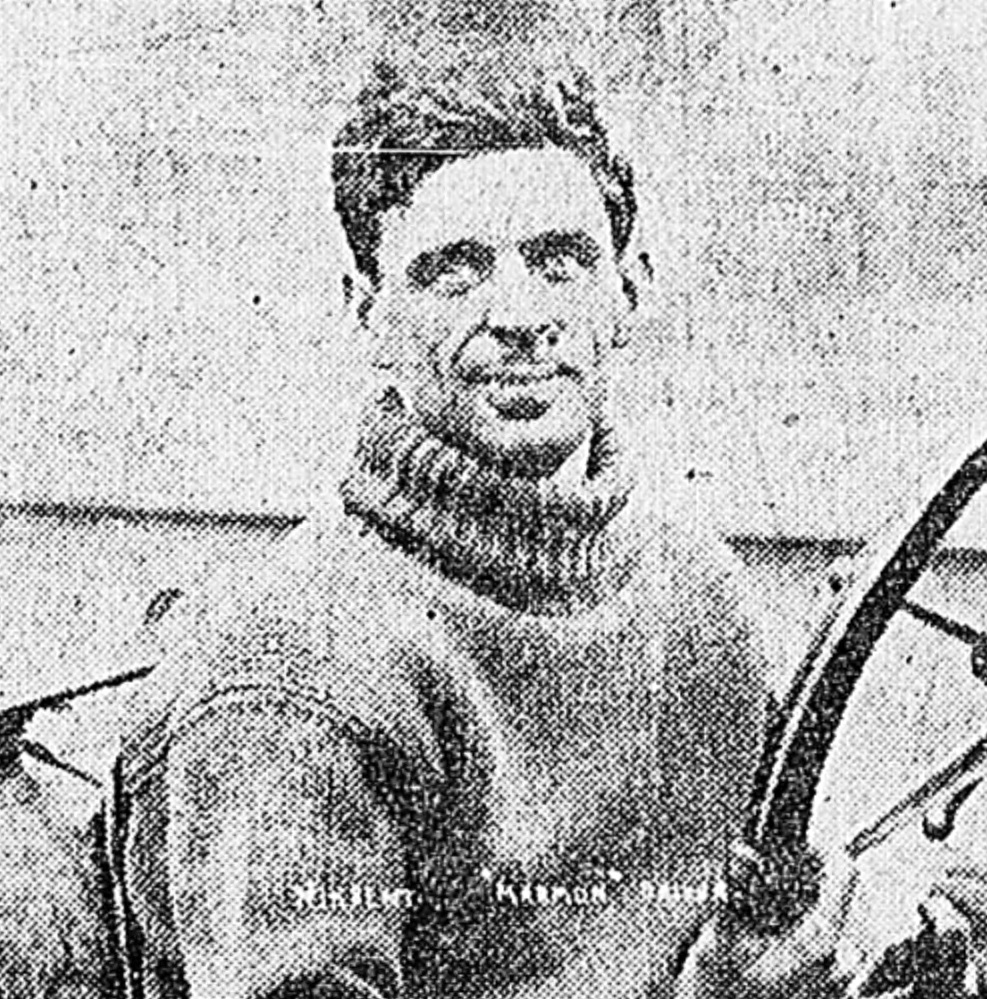
- Nikrent in 1911
- Born: Joseph August Nikrent; August 4, 1879 Detroit, Michigan, U.S.
- Died: July 25, 1958 (aged 78) Los Angeles, California, U.S.

Champ Car career
- 8 races run over 5 years
- First race: 1909 Shelter Trophy (Santa Monica)
- Last race: 1913 Galveston 100 #2 (Galveston)
- First win: 1909 Cactus Derby (Los Angeles to Phoenix)
Wins	Podiums	Poles
1	4	0

Joseph August Nikrent (August 4, 1879 – July 25, 1958) was an American racing driver. He competed in eight AAA Championship Car races from 1909 to 1913, winning the 1909 point-to-point race between Phoenix, Arizona and Los Angeles behind the wheel of a Buick. He drove in the 1913 Indianapolis 500 behind the wheel of a Case but burned a bearing on the 67th lap and failed to finish. He returned to Indy in 1915 but failed to qualify. He later made land speed record attempts.

== Motorsports career results ==
=== Indianapolis 500 results ===
Year	Car	Start	Qual	Rank	Finish	Laps	Led	Retired
1913	32	24	78.890	21	18	67	0	Bearing
Totals						67	0	

Starts	1
Poles	0
Front Row	0
Wins	0
Top 5	0
Top 10	0
Retired	1
