= Billy Leisaw =

American racing driver (1875–1941)

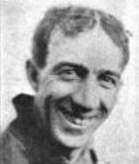
- Born: William John Leisaw; October 24, 1875 Vassar, Michigan, U.S.
- Died: April 15, 1941 (aged 65) Columbiaville, Michigan, U.S.

Champ Car career
- 2 races run over 2 years
- First race: 1912 Indianapolis 500 (Indianapolis)
- Last race: 1913 Indianapolis 500 (Indianapolis)
Wins	Podiums	Poles
0	0	0

William John Leisaw (occasionally written incorrectly as Liesaw, October 24, 1875 – April 15, 1941) was an American racing driver who competed in the second and third Indianapolis 500 races in 1912 and 1913, driving a Buick.

== Biography ==
Leisaw was born October 24, 1875, in Vassar, Michigan, the son of John and Margaret McClain. He married Ella Monroe on September 18, 1895, in Vassar.

Leisaw worked as district sales manager at Miller - Judd Electrical Co. in 1918, in Detroit, Michigan. He was an automobile dealer for almost all his working life.

Leisaw committed suicide in Columbiaville, Michigan on April 15, 1941.

== Motorsports career results ==
=== Indianapolis 500 results ===
Year	Car	Start	Qual	Rank	Finish	Laps	Led	Retired
1912	17	14	77.510	21	17	72	0	Caught fire
1913	17	3	78.020	22	14	148	0	Loose rods
Totals						220	0	

Starts	2
Poles	0
Front Row	1
Wins	0
Top 5	0
Top 10	0
Retired	2
