= Schacht (automobile) =

Defunct US automobile manufacturer

Schacht Manufacturing Company Schacht Motor Car Company
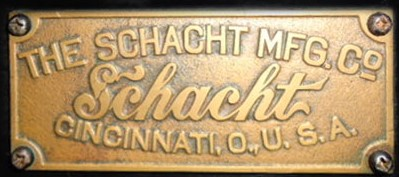
- The Invincible Schacht
- Industry: Automotive
- Founded: 1904; 122 years ago
- Founder: Gustav A. Schacht, William Schacht
- Defunct: 1913; 113 years ago
- Fate: Reorganization
- Successor: Schacht Motor Truck Company
- Headquarters: Cincinnati, Ohio, United States
- Key people: Gustav A. Schacht, William Schacht
- Products: High wheeler, Automobiles
- Production output: 9,256 (1904-1913)

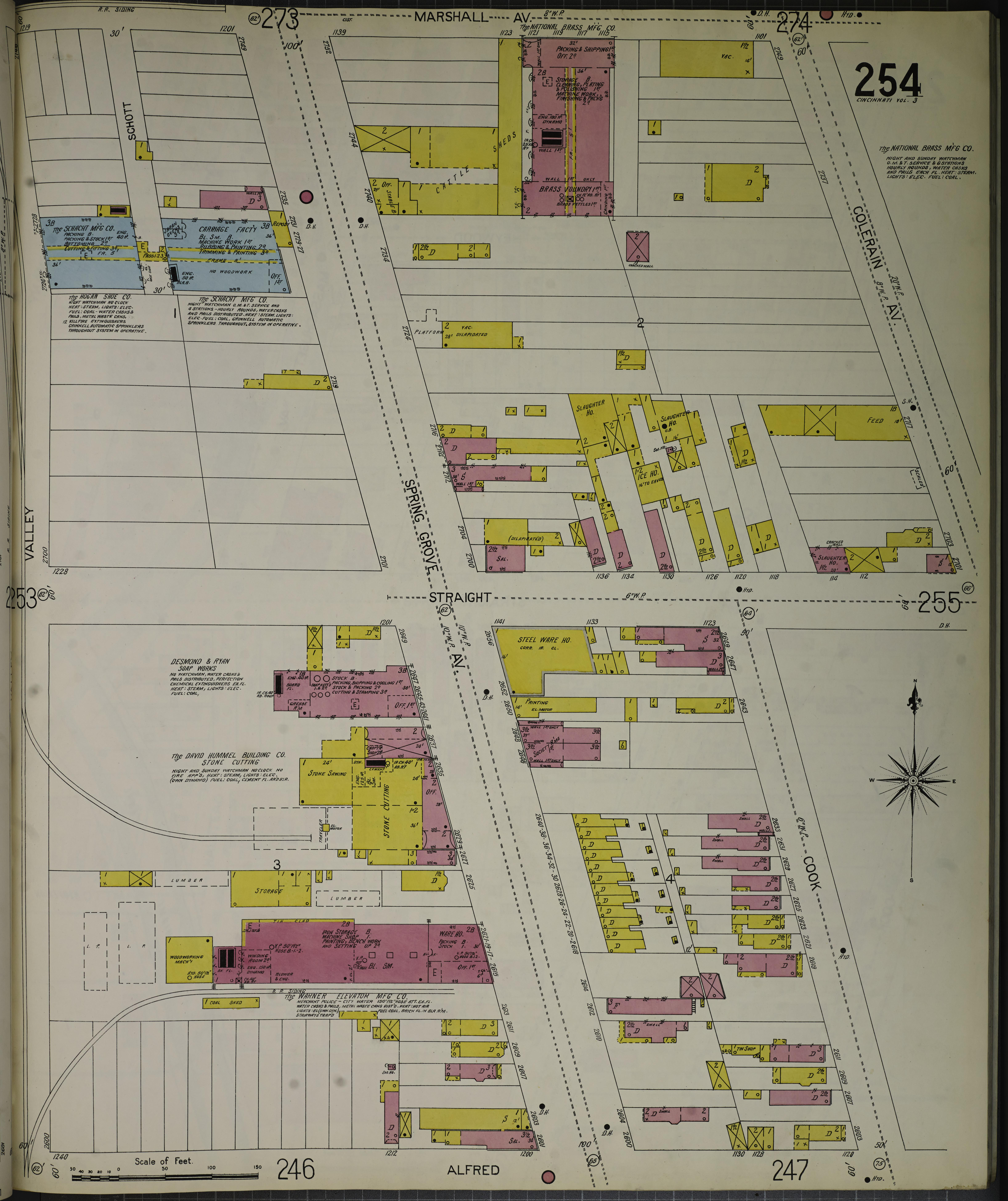
Schacht Plant (1904)

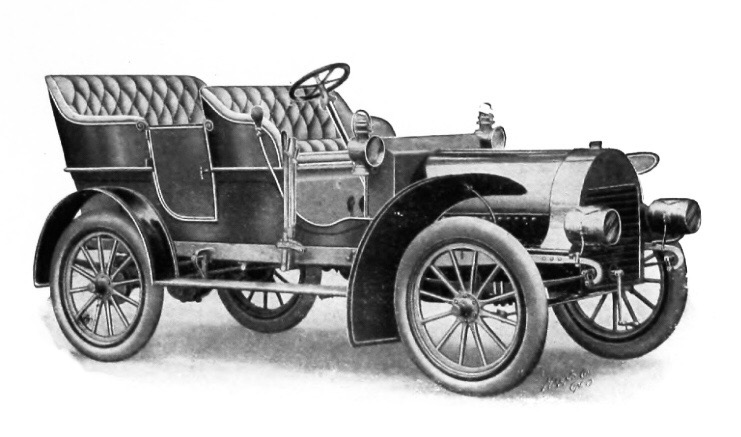
Schacht Touring (1905–1906)

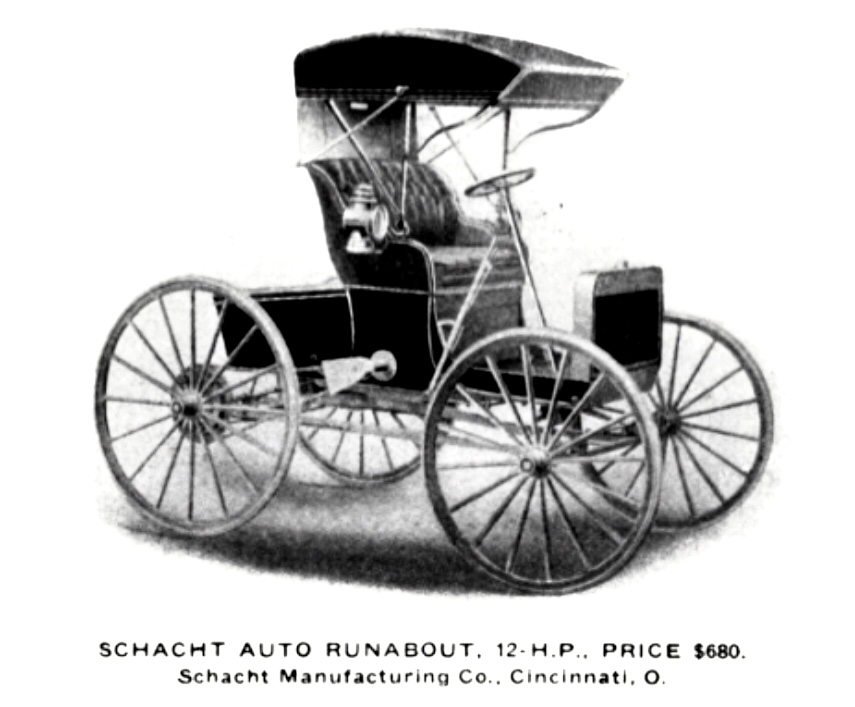
Schacht Runabout Model K (1908) 12 hp

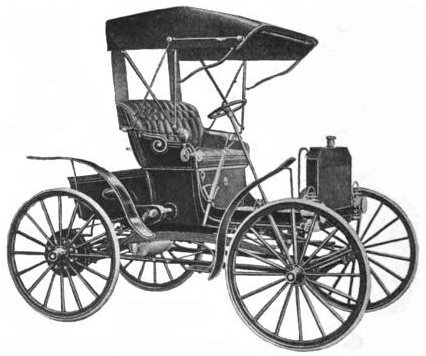
Schacht Auto Runabout Model K (1909) 20 hp

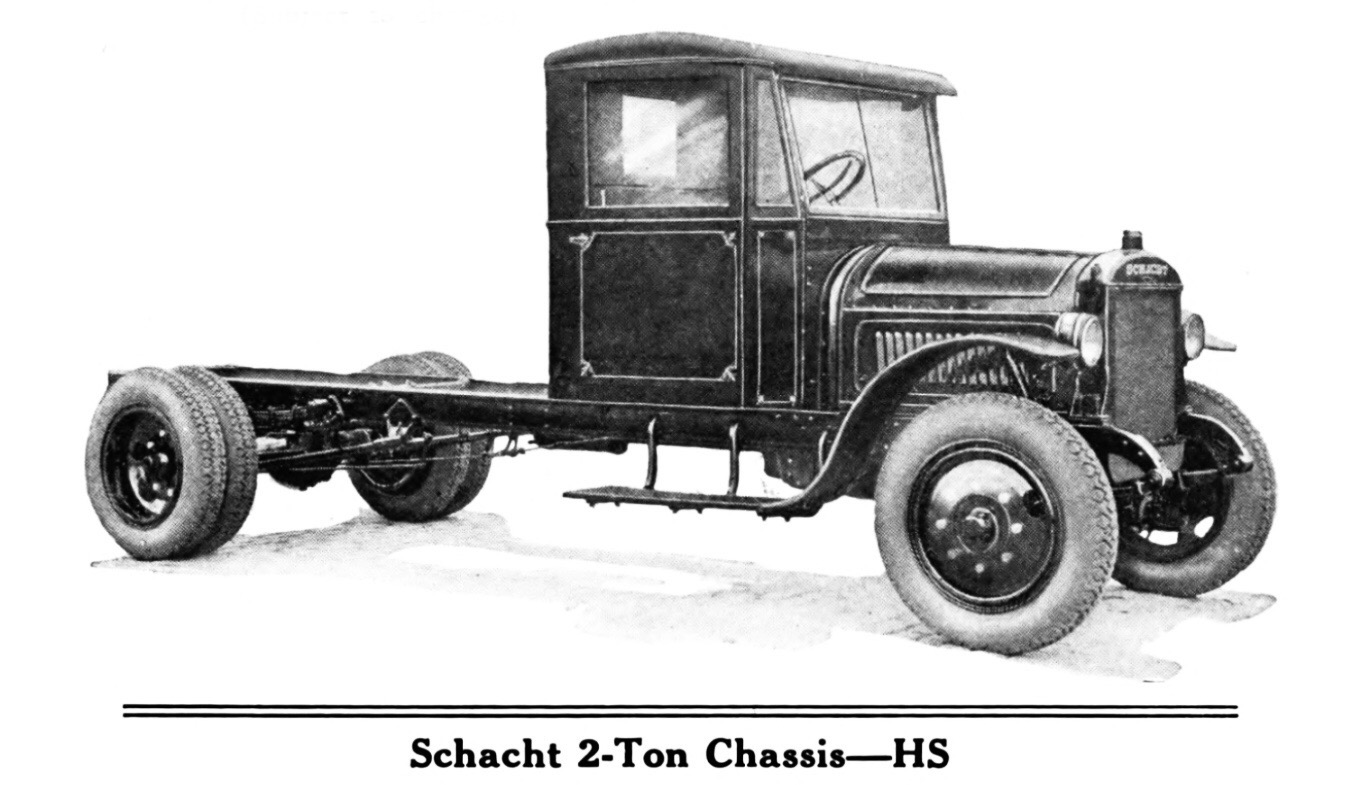
Schacht HS (1928)

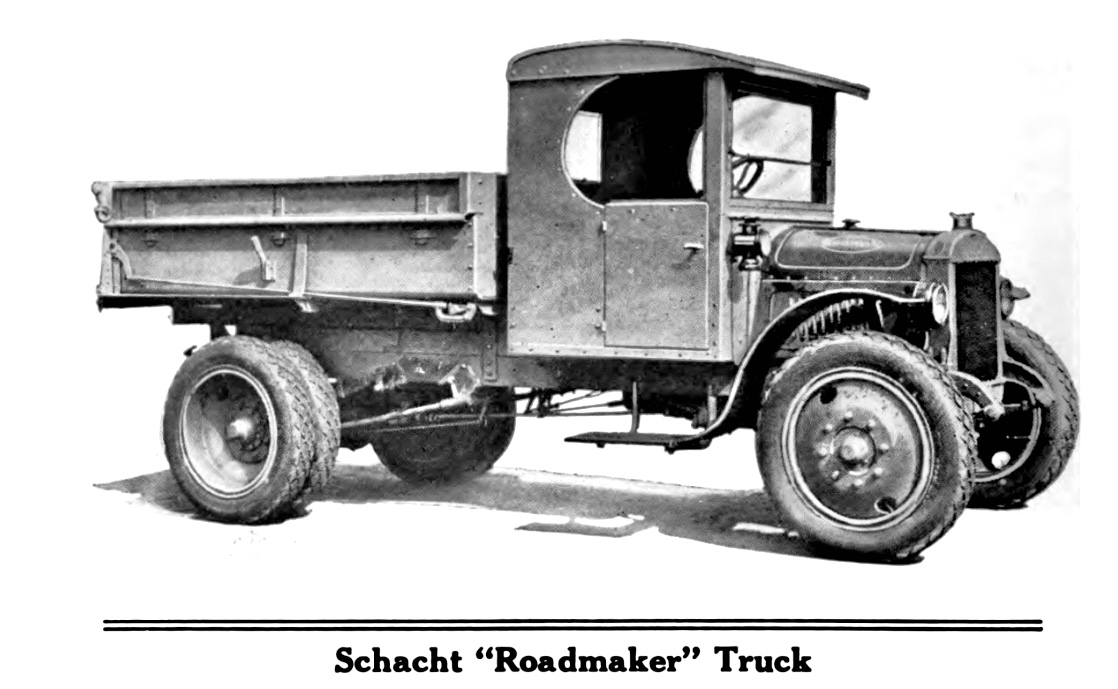
Schacht Roadmaker (1928)

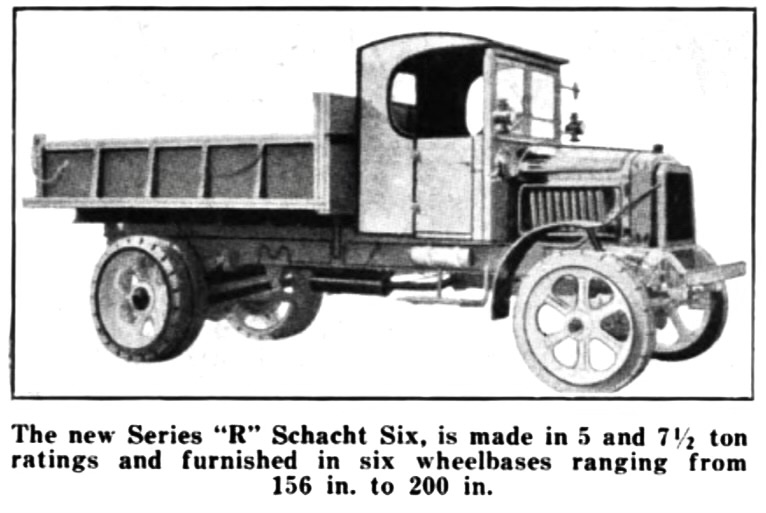
Schacht Model R (1928) 5-7,5 to

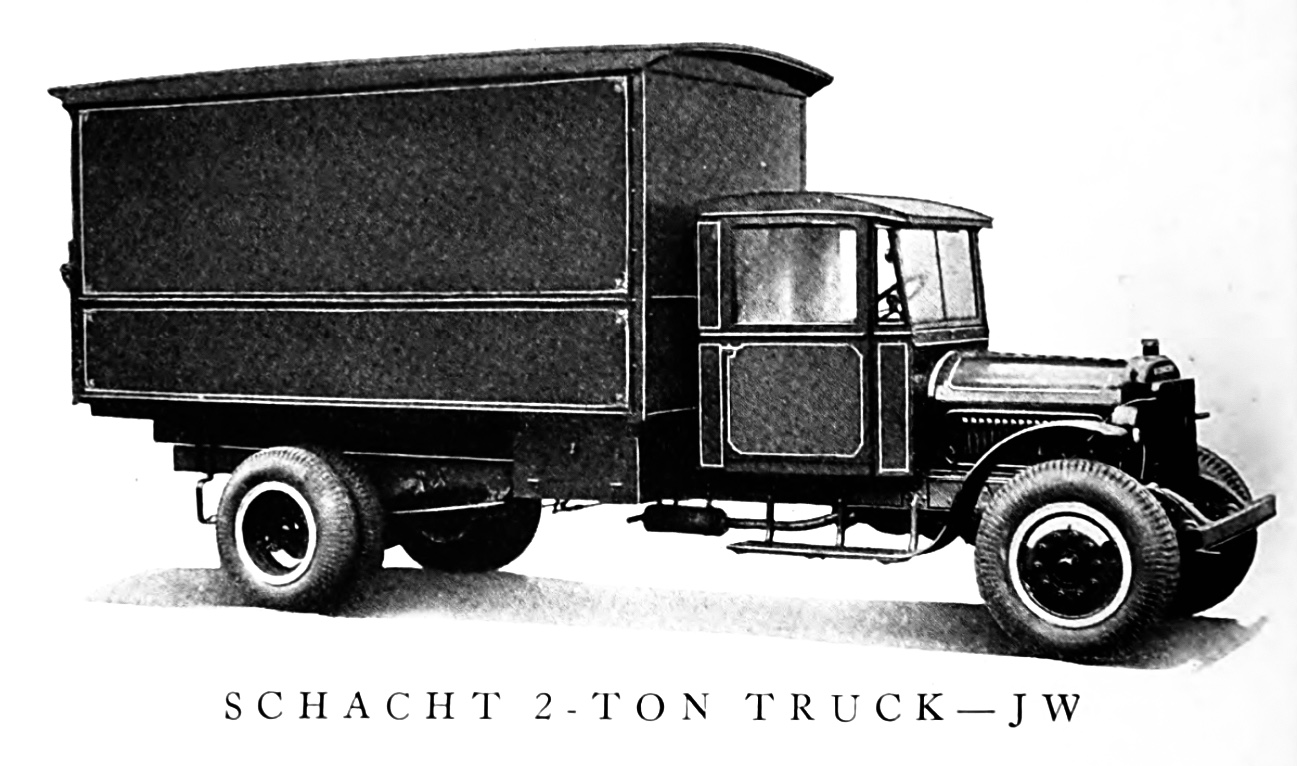
Schacht JW (1929).

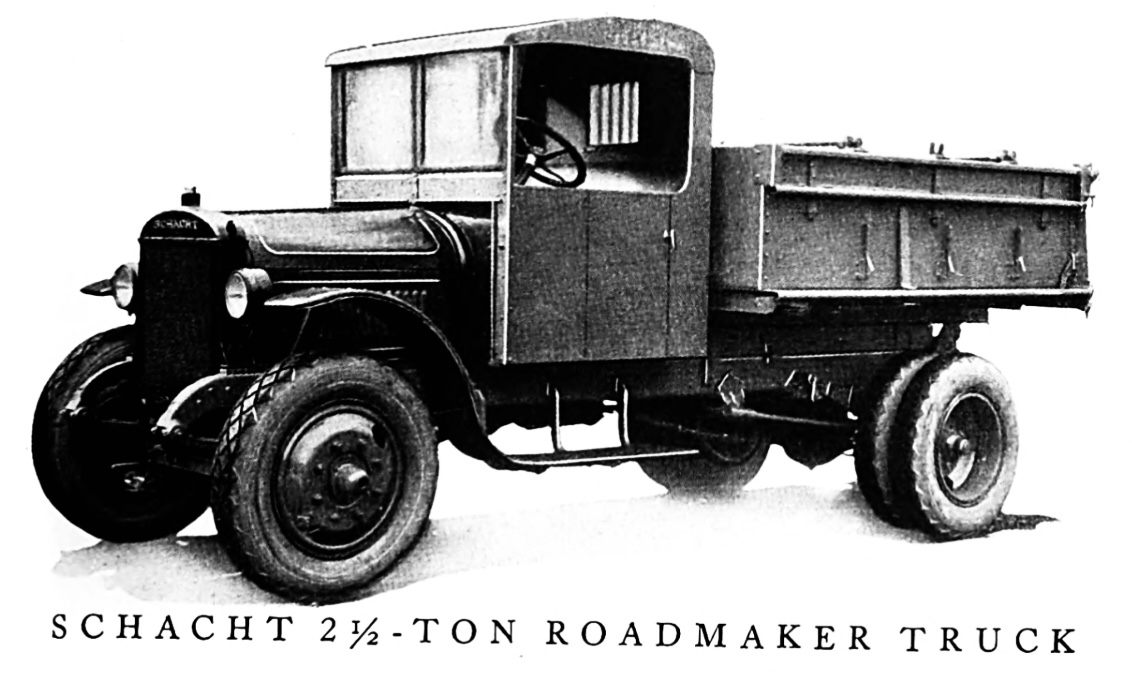
Schacht T (1929).

Schacht was an American marque of automobiles and High-wheelers from 1904 to 1913, in Cincinnati, Ohio. The Schacht Manufacturing Company, later renamed Schacht Motor Car Company produced over 9,000 automobiles. The company was reorganized as the G.A. Schacht Motor Truck Company in 1914 and production of trucks and fire trucks continued until 1938.

== History ==
The Schacht Manufacturing Company was started by William and Gustav Schacht in Cincinnati, Ohio, producing buggies. A sideline business of manufacturing automobile components grew into producing their first high-wheeler automobile in 1904. The Schacht was a twin-cylinder 10hp runabout, designed for rural roads with carriage wheels.

Advertised as "the simplest, most practical, efficient and economical car made", it had a steering wheel and attractive brass radiator from the beginning. The High-wheeler's were priced in the $650 (equivalent to $23,292 in 2025) range and were extremely popular. In 1905 a larger 4-cylinder, 40 hp touring car was added and marketed until 1907. The touring car was luxury priced at $2,800 to $3,200, equivalent to $114,667 in 2025. From 1908 to 1911 only high-wheel cars were produced.

The high-wheelers steadily grew more powerful resulting in the twin-cylinder engine rated at 24 hp by 1910. In 1911 Schacht returned to producing conventional touring cars with the 4-cylinder Model AA mid-priced at $1,385, equivalent to $47,857 in 2025. Schacht marketed a "Three Purpose Car" which was a runabout that was convertible to a family car or delivery wagon.

Schacht entered the 1912 Indianapolis 500, with a Wisconsin engine race car, driven by Bill Endicott. Endicott in the Schacht #18 placed Fifth. Schacht ran the 1913 Indianapolis 500 with John Jenkins driving Schacht #18 with a Schacht engine. Jenkins retired with a crankcase failure. In the year 1912, the Model J-M was introduced. The last car models from the year 1913 were the K.L., N.S., and P.P. models before the company gave up passenger car production. In 1913, a new delivery van, the Model N.D. 4, was introduced.

Gustav and William Schacht reported a "lack of good business system in all departments" and reorganized as the G. A. Schacht Motor Truck Company in 1914. Schacht purchased or merged several times with other truck companies and continued building trucks and fire trucks until 1938.

== Gallery ==
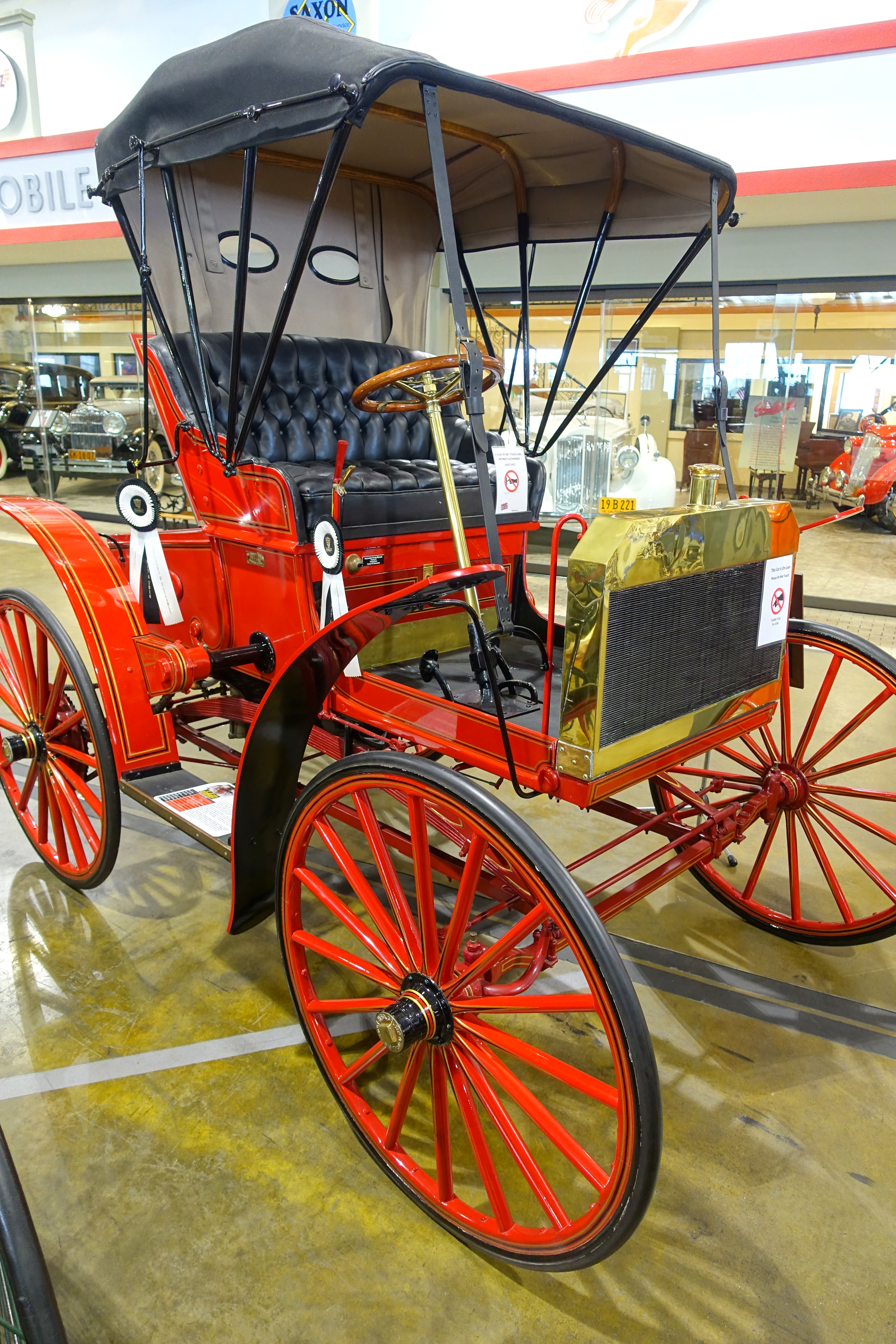
1904 Schacht Twin 10 hp Runabout

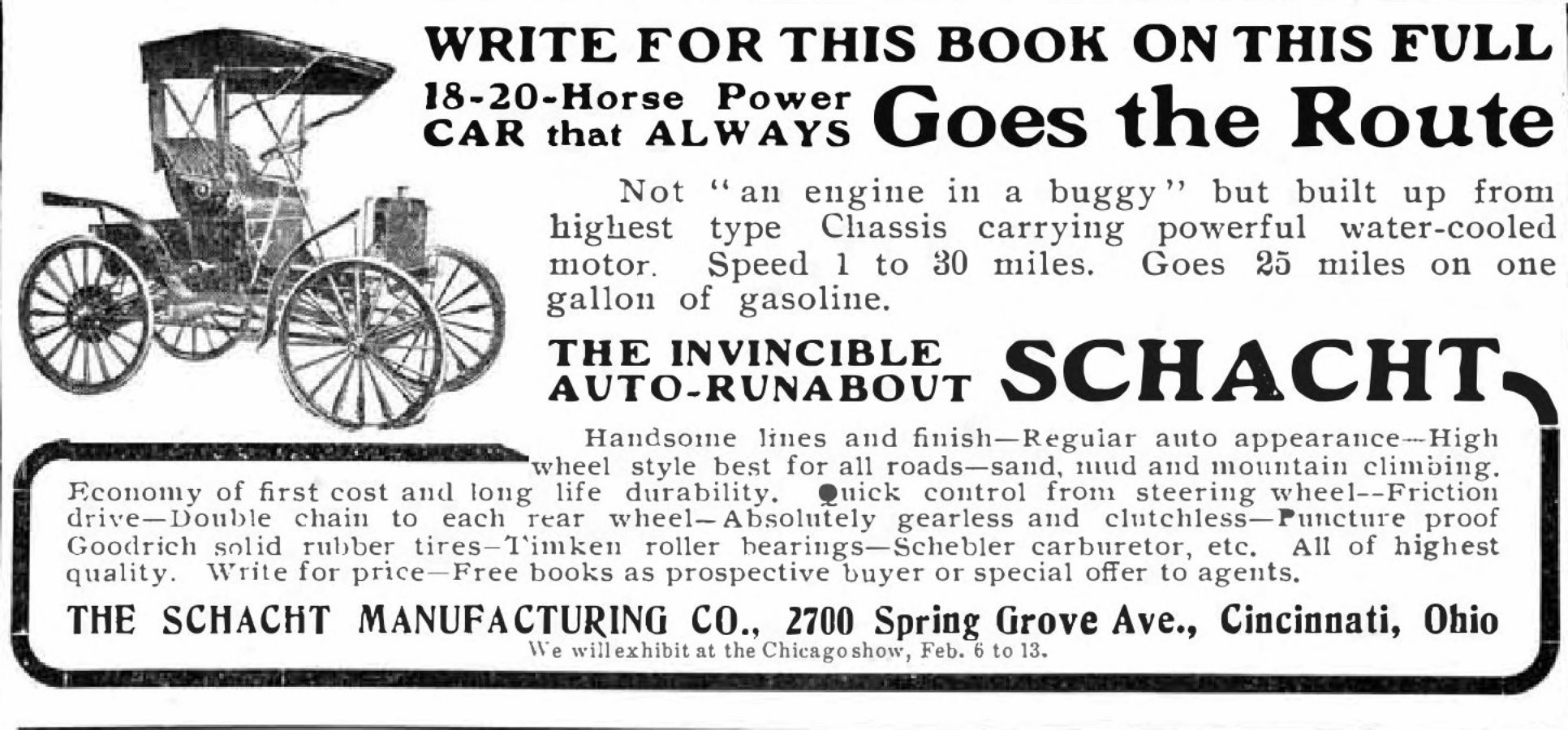
Advertising for 1908 Schacht

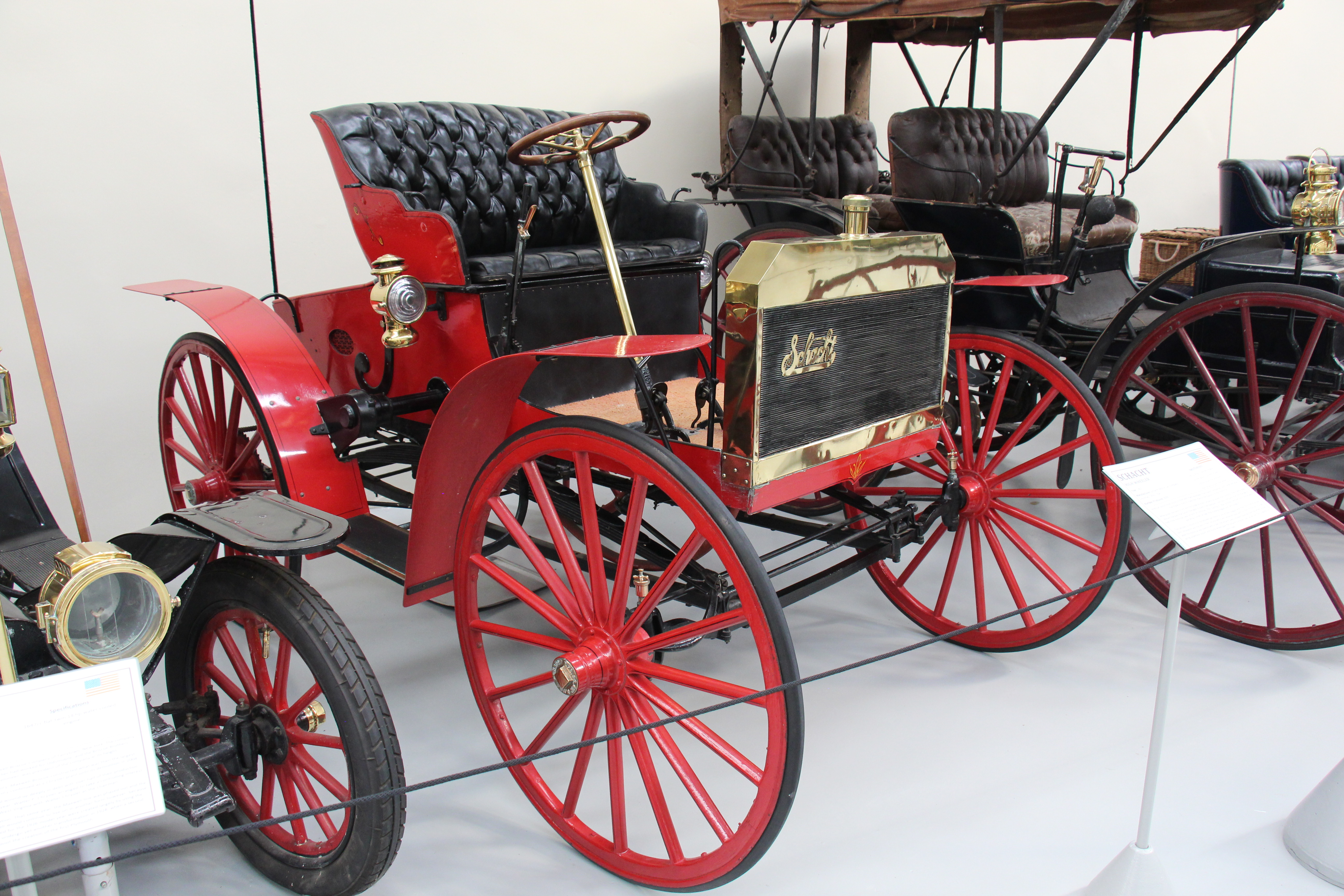
1907 Schacht Model H Runabout

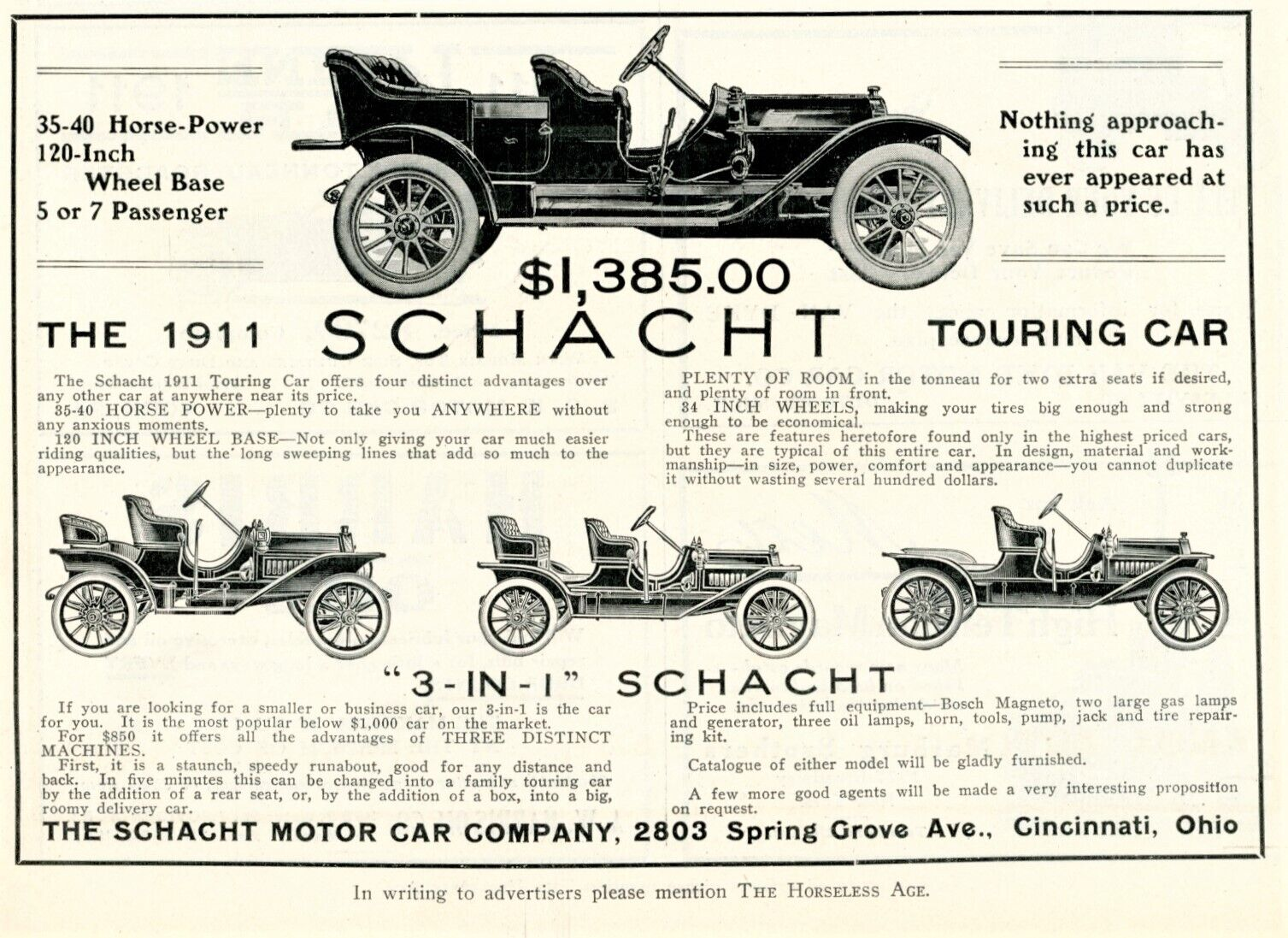
1911 Schacht advertisement in the Horseless Age

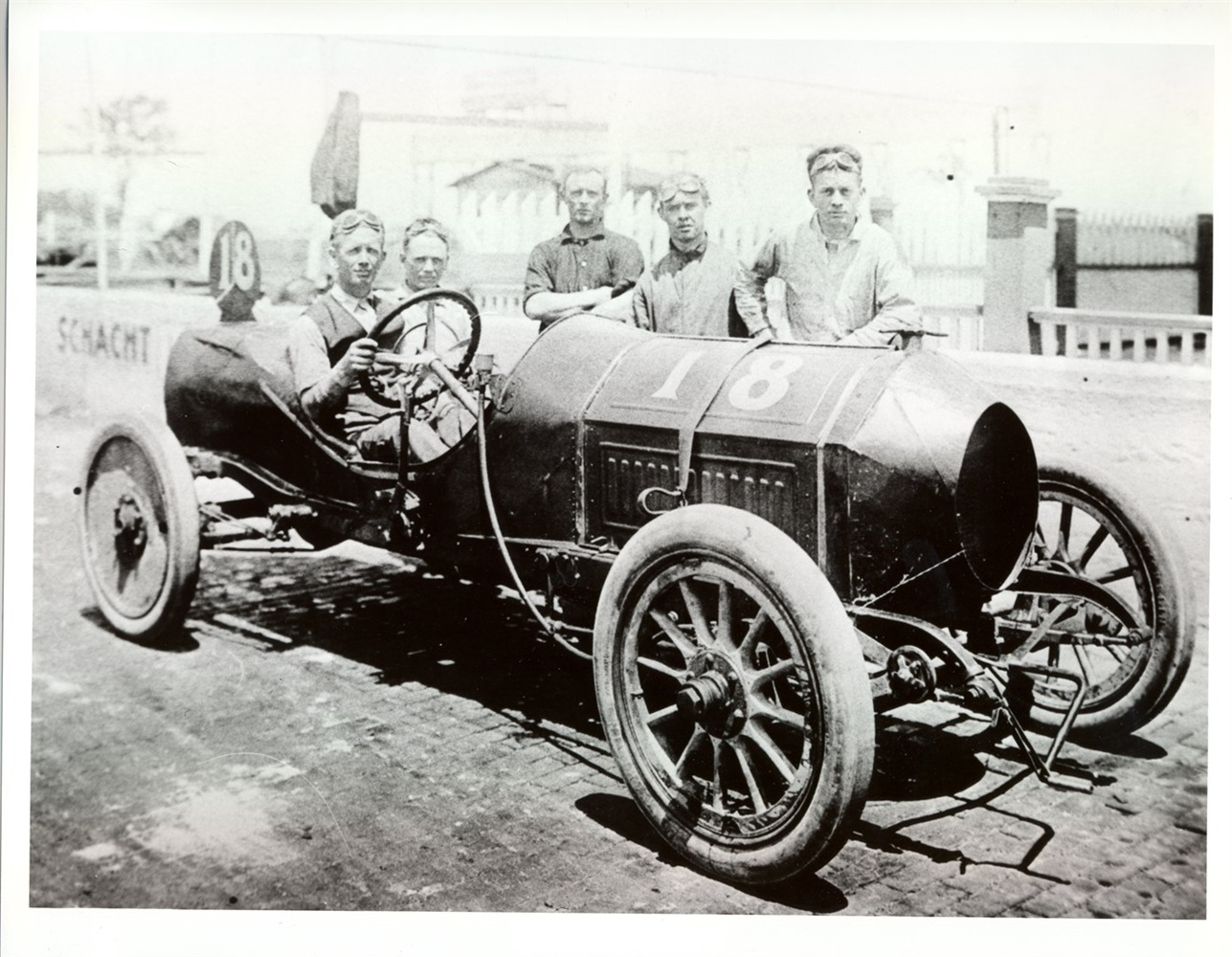
1912 Indianapolis 500, Bill Endicott on Schacht #18. 5th place.

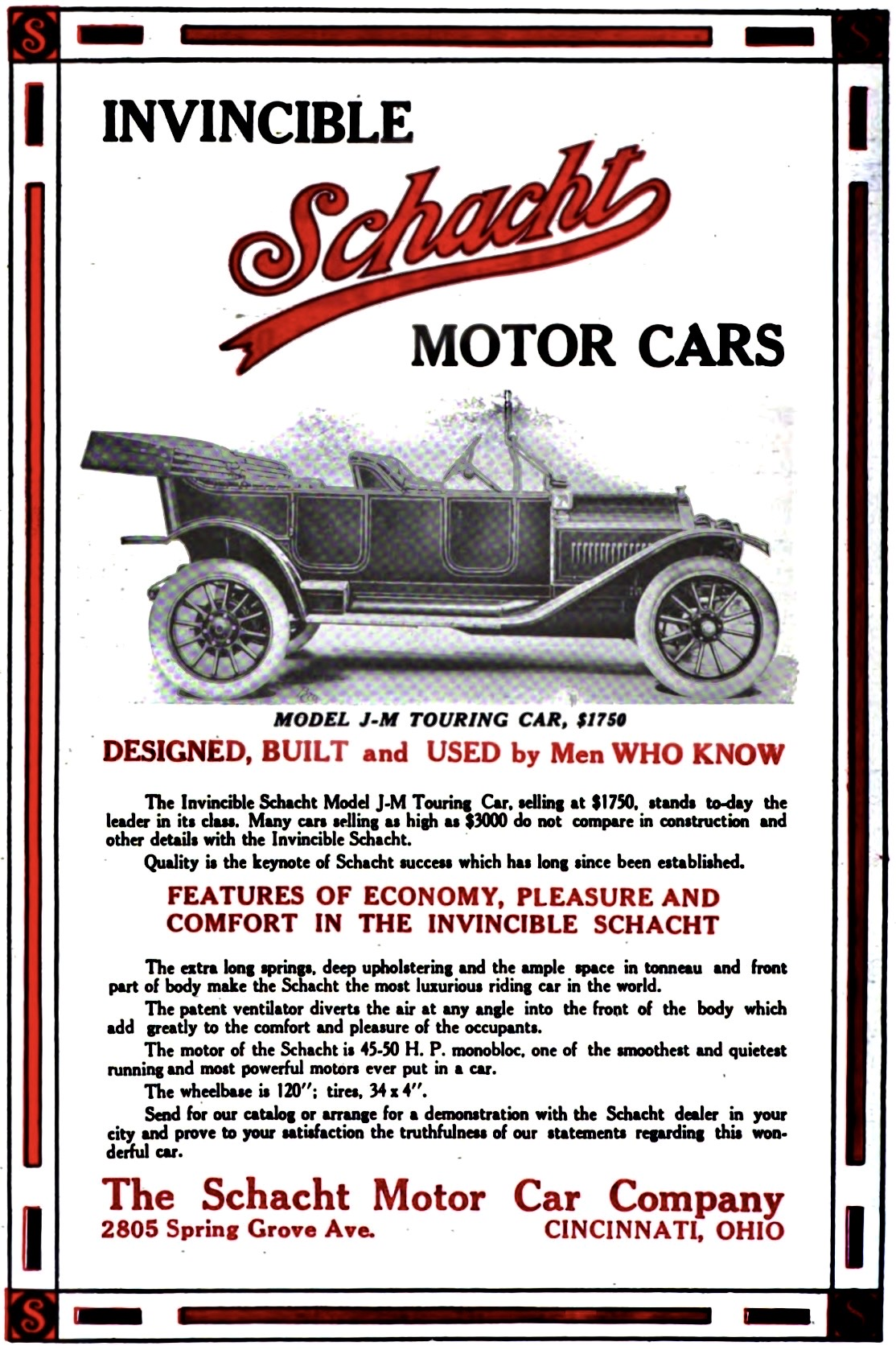
Schacht Model J-M (1912)

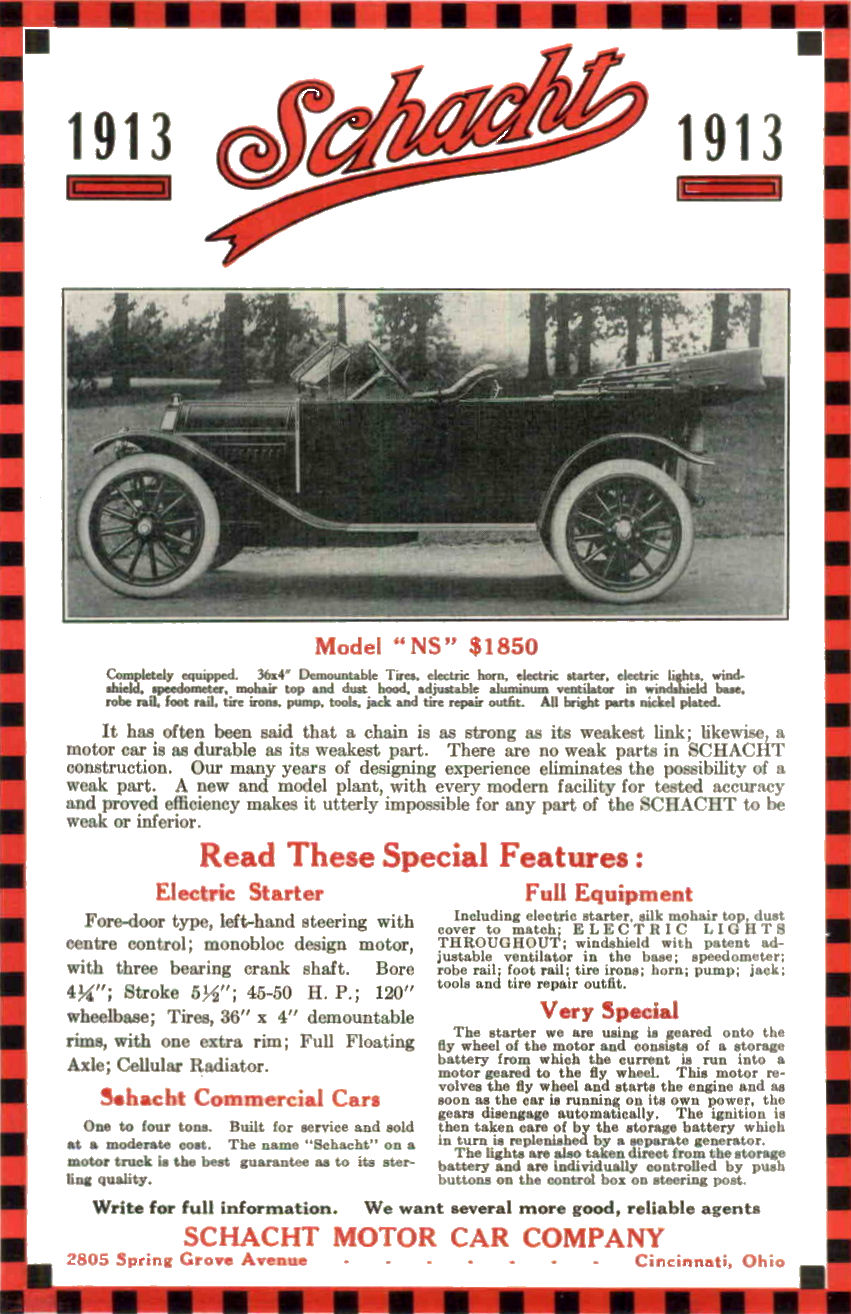
1913 Schacht advertisement in Cycle and Automobile Trade Journal

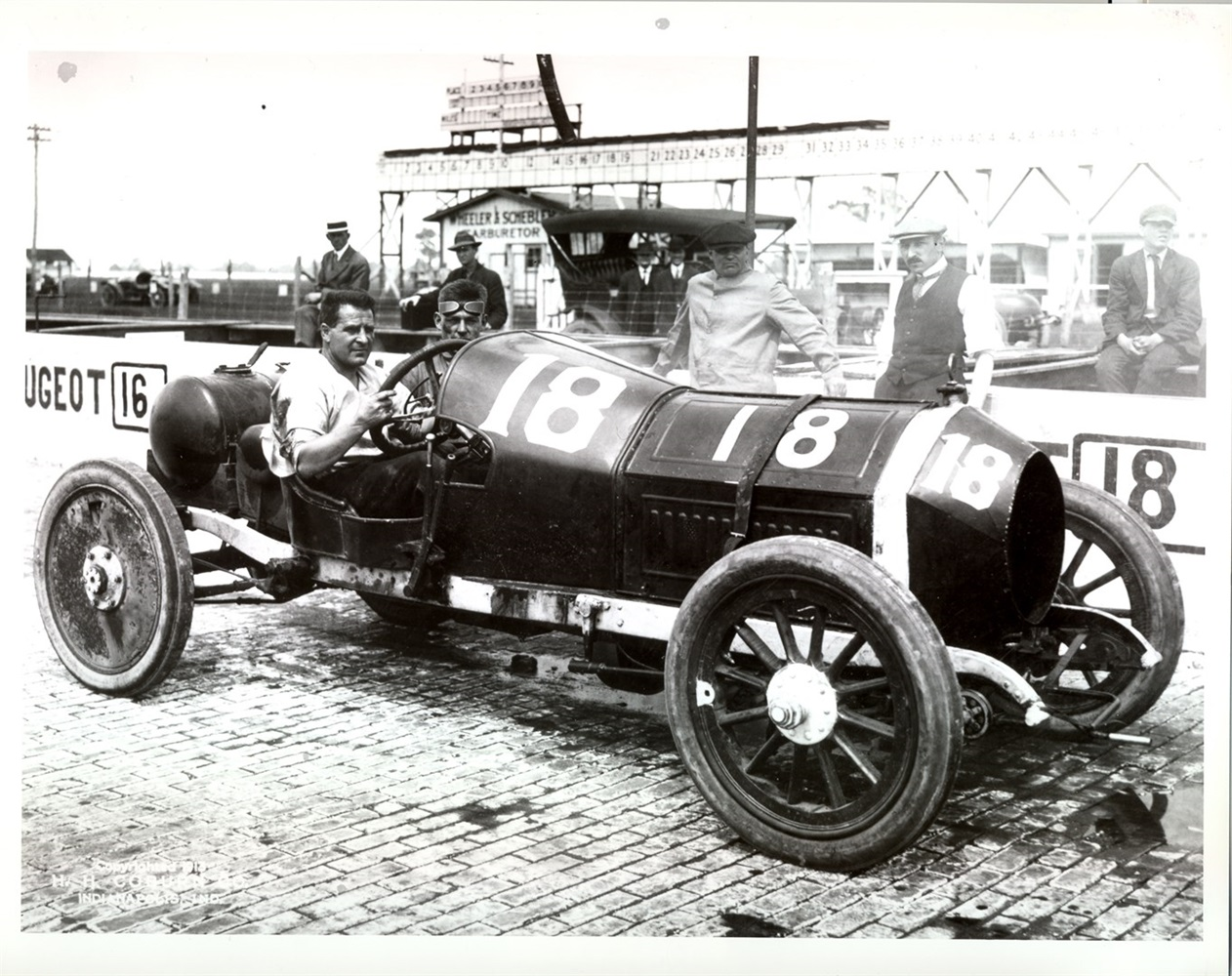
1913 Indianapolis 500 - John Jenkins on Schacht #18. Retired, crankcase failure.

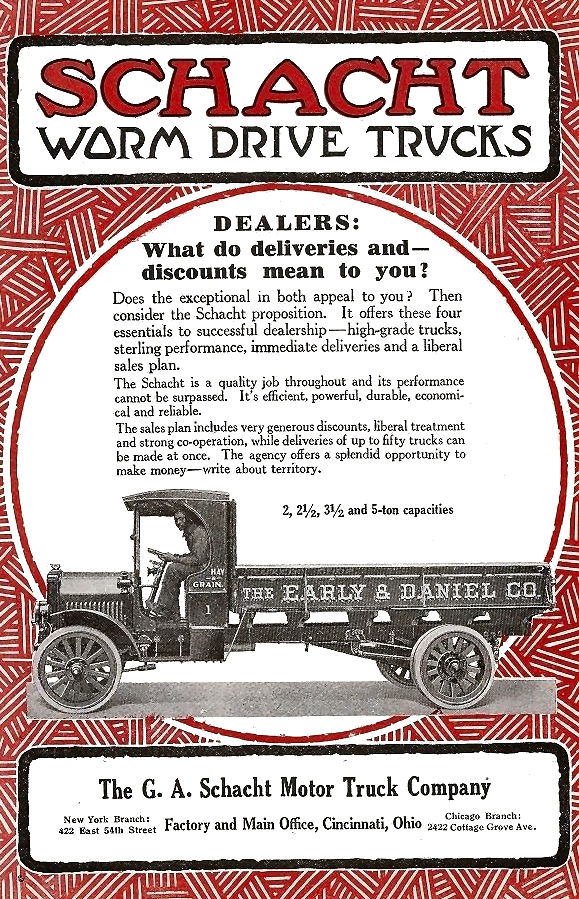
1918 Schacht Worm Drive Trucks advertisement
