= Jules Goux =

French racing driver (1885–1965)

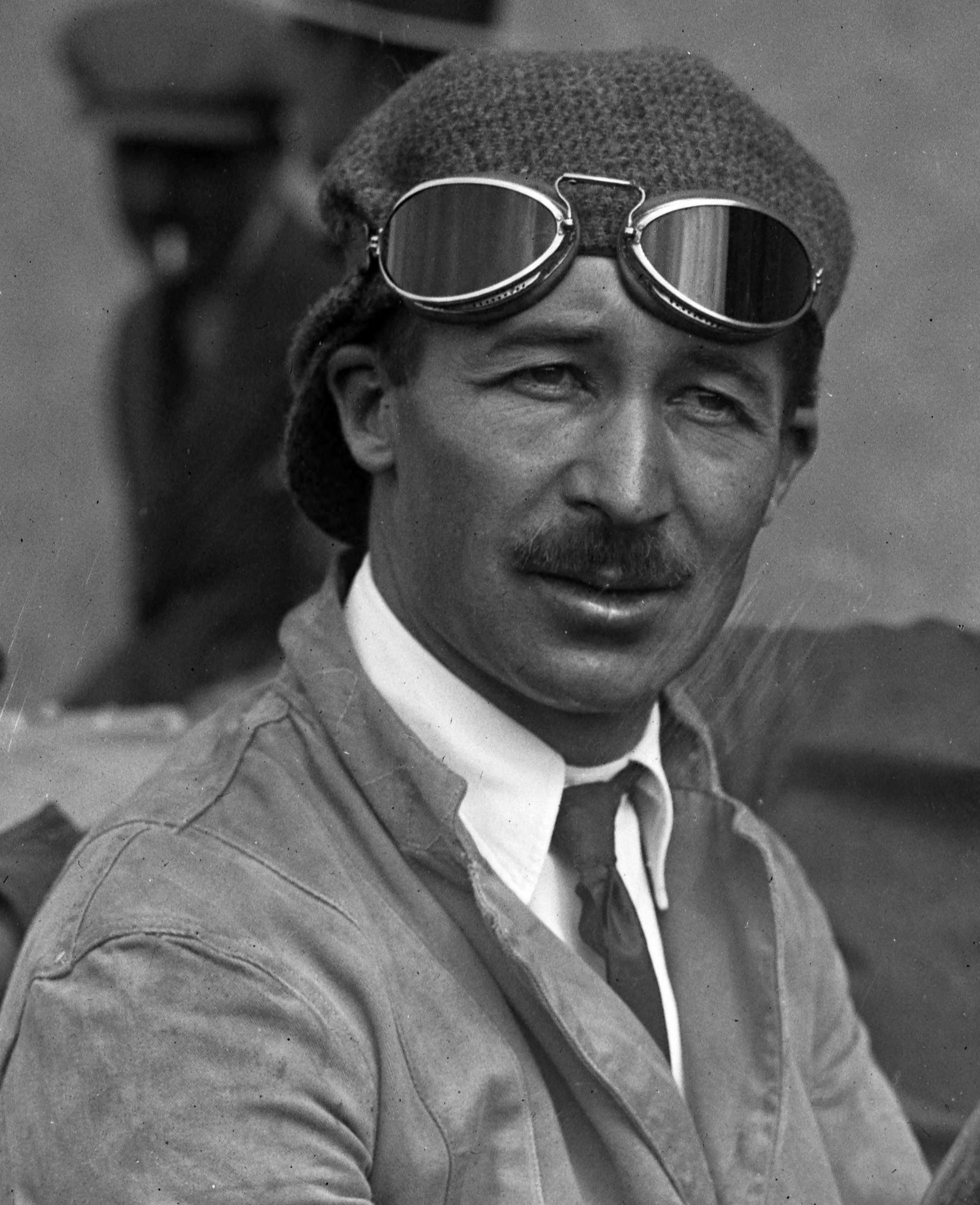
- Goux in 1921
- Born: Jules Eugène Goux; 6 April 1885 Valentigney, Doubs, France
- Died: 6 March 1965 (aged 79) Mirmande, Drôme, France

Championship titles
- Major victories Indianapolis 500 (1913)

Champ Car career
- 5 races run over 5 years
- First race: 1913 Indianapolis 500 (Indianapolis)
- Last race: 1922 Indianapolis 500 (Indianapolis)
- First win: 1913 Indianapolis 500 (Indianapolis)
Wins	Podiums	Poles
1	2	0

Jules Eugène Goux (6 April 1885 – 6 March 1965) was a French racing driver and Grand Prix motor racing champion. He was notable for being the first European driver to win the Indianapolis 500.

== Biography ==
Influenced by the Gordon Bennett Cup in auto racing, Goux began racing cars in his early twenties. Success came in 1909 on a circuit set up on roads around Sitges, near Barcelona, Spain, when he won the Catalan Cup, a victory he repeated the following year. Because of his racing success, along with Georges Boillot, he was invited by Peugeot Automobile to race for their factory team. As part of a four-man design team led by Paul Zuccarelli and Ernest Henry, Goux helped develop a racecar powered by a radically new Straight-4 engine using a twin overhead cam.

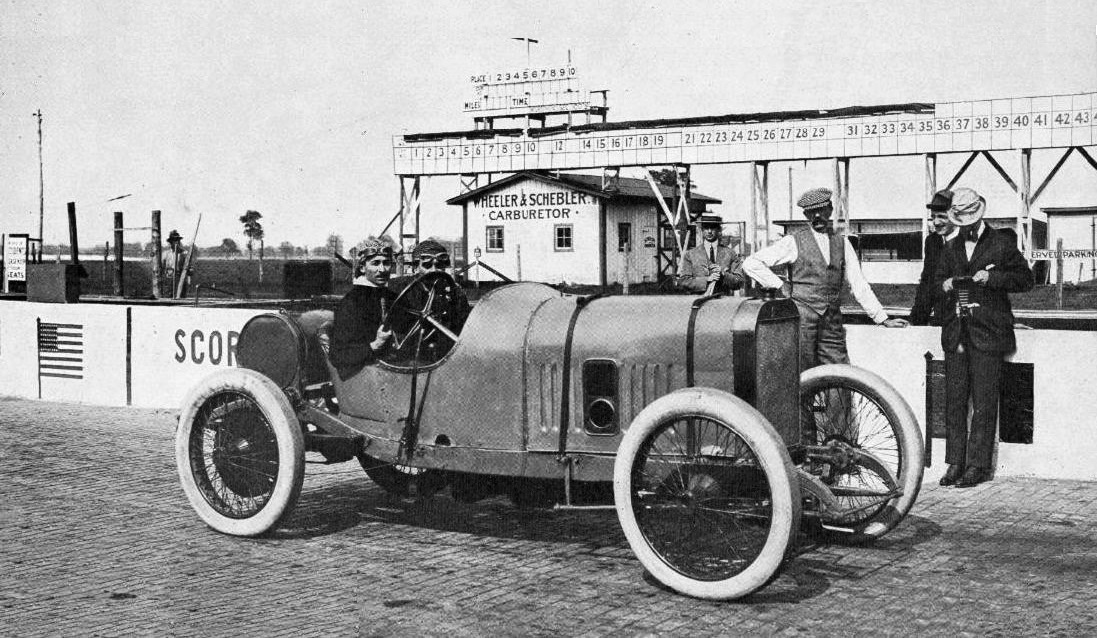
Jules Goux at 1913 Indianapolis 500

Goux won the 1912 Sarthe Cup at Le Mans driving a Peugeot, and in 1913 he traveled with the team to the United States to compete in the Indianapolis 500. Goux won the race, becoming the first non-American Indianapolis 500 winner in history. Goux reportedly consumed four bottles of champagne while driving in the Indianapolis 500 (then known as the International 500-Mile Sweepstakes Race) and was later quoted as saying, "Without the good wine, I would have not been able to win."

The following year, World War I broke out in Europe and Goux's racing career had to be put aside for service in the French military. At war's end, he returned to European Grand Prix motor racing. In 1921, driving for Ballot Automobile, he finished third in the French Grand Prix then won the inaugural Italian Grand Prix at Brescia, Italy. For the next few years his racing career was marked by repeated problems and he did not return to the winner's circle until 1926. That year, driving for Bugatti in a T39A model, he won both the French Grand Prix at Miramas and the European Grand Prix at the Circuito Lasarte, Spain.

== Motorsports career results ==
=== Indianapolis 500 results ===
Year	Car	Start	Qual	Rank	Finish	Laps	Led	Retired
1913	16	7	86.030	3	1	200	138	Running
1914	6	19	98.130	2	4	200	1	Running
1919	6	22	95.000	15	3	200	0	Running
1920	16	21	84.300	19	15	148	0	Engine trouble
1922	14	22	96.950	9	25	25	0	Axle
Totals						773	139	

Starts	5
Poles	0
Front Row	0
Wins	1
Top 5	3
Top 10	3
Retired	2

Preceded by Joe Dawson	Indianapolis 500 Winner; 1913	Succeeded by René Thomas
