= Don Herr =

American racing driver (1889–1953)

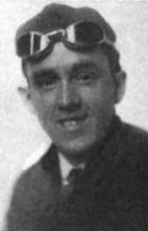
- Born: Donald Herbert Herr; August 31, 1889 Salona, Pennsylvania, U.S.
- Died: June 21, 1953 (aged 63) Lake James, Indiana, U.S.

Champ Car career
- 3 races run over 2 years
- First race: 1911 Illinois Trophy (Elgin)
- Last race: 1913 Indianapolis 500 (Indianapolis)
- First win: 1911 Illinois Trophy (Elgin)
| Wins | Podiums | Poles |
|---|---|---|
| 1 | 2 | 0 |

Donald Herbert Herr (August 31, 1889 – June 21, 1953) was an American racing driver.

== Biography ==
Herr was born in Salona, Pennsylvania on August 31, 1889.

Herr won the 1911 Illinois Trophy Race held on the roads of Elgin, Illinois driving a National. In the 1912 Indianapolis 500, he served as a relief driver for Joe Dawson from lap 108 to 144. Afterwards, Dawson returned to the car and drove on to victory. Herr is not credited as an Indianapolis 500 winner because Dawson both started and finished the race. Herr drove his own car in the 1913 Indianapolis 500 and started fifth and completed only seven laps before being knocked out by a broken clutch shaft, driving a Wisconsin powered Stutz. It would be his last Championship Car start.

Herr died at his home on Lake James, Indiana on June 21, 1953.

== Motorsports career results ==
=== Indianapolis 500 results ===
| Year | Car | Start | Qual | Rank | Finish | Laps | Led | Retired |
|---|---|---|---|---|---|---|---|---|
| 1913 | 8 | 5 | 82.840 | 9 | 26 | 7 | 0 | Clutch shaft |
| Totals | | | | | | 7 | 0 | |

| Starts | 1 |
| Poles | 0 |
| Front Row | 0 |
| Wins | 0 |
| Top 5 | 0 |
| Top 10 | 0 |
| Retired | 1 |
