= Vincenzo Trucco =

Italian racing driver (fl. 1905–1930)

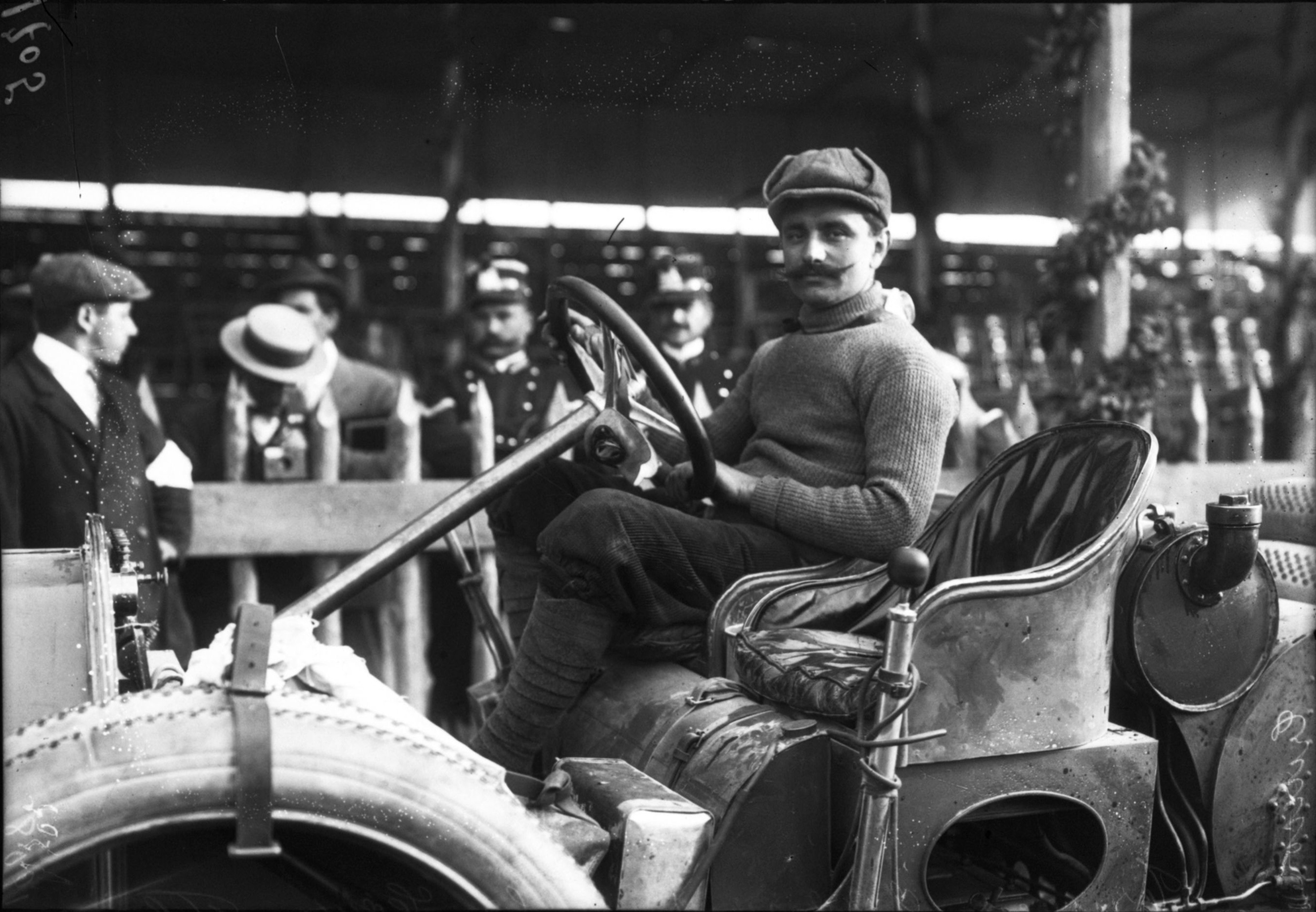
- Trucco in an Isotta Fraschini-type I, circa 1908
- Born: 07 April 1881 Savona, Italy
- Died: 12 May 1967 Bellusco, Italy

Champ Car career
- 1 race run over 1 year
- First race: 1913 Indianapolis 500 (Indianapolis)
Wins	Podiums	Poles
0	0	0

Vincenzo Trucco was an Italian racing driver from Milan. He was the Isotta Fraschini works driver and won the 1908 Targa Florio. He also competed in the 1913 Indianapolis 500, one of the first Europe-based drivers to travel to the U.S. for the event. Trucco was also friend and mentor to Alfieri Maserati, with whom he patented the spark plug.

== Motorsports career results ==
=== Indianapolis 500 results ===
Year	Car	Start	Qual	Rank	Finish	Laps	Led	Retired
1913	28	18	81.940	14	20	39	0	Loose gas tank
Totals						39	0	

Starts	1
Poles	0
Front Row	0
Wins	0
Top 5	0
Top 10	0
Retired	1
