= Louis Disbrow =

American racing driver (1876–1939)

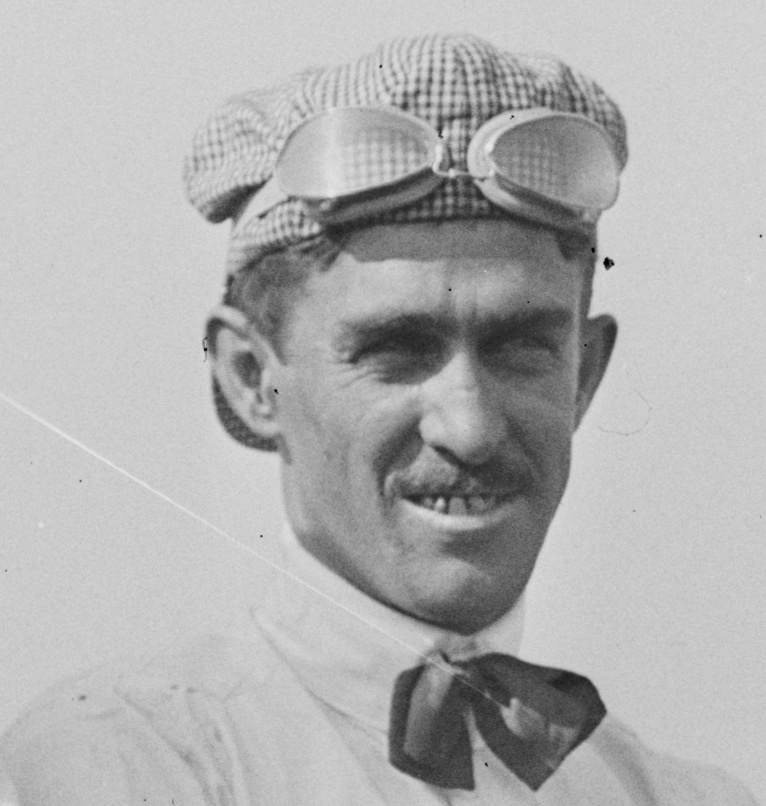
- Disbrow at the 1911 Indianapolis 500
- Born: Louis Arthur Disbrow; September 23, 1876 Queens, New York, U.S.
- Died: July 9, 1939 (aged 62) Philadelphia, Pennsylvania, U.S.

Champ Car career
- 19 races run over 7 years
- First race: 1909 Merrimack Valley Trophy (Merrimack Valley)
- Last race: 1915 Southern Sweepstakes (Oklahoma City)
- First win: 1911 Jacksonville 100 (Pablo Beach)
- Last win: 1913 Galveston 100 #3 (Galveston)
Wins	Podiums	Poles
4	8	0

Louis Arthur Disbrow (September 23, 1876 – July 9, 1939) was an American racing driver.

== Early life ==
Disbrow was born on September 23, 1876, in Richmond Hill, Queens, New York. He came from a wealthy family.

=== Murder Trial ===
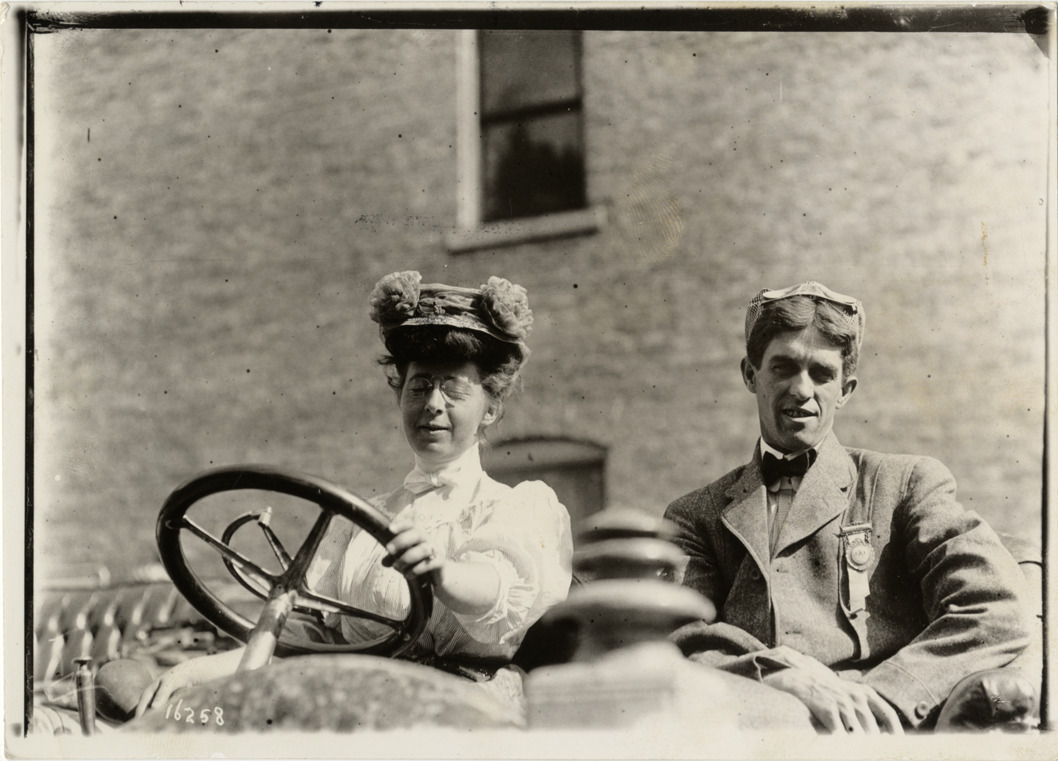
Joan Cuneo and Louis Disbrow seated in an automobile

Disbrow was indicted for the 1902 murders of Sarah "Dimples" Lawrence and Clarence Foster in Good Ground, but found not guilty at trial in 1903. He was then hired by a neighbouring family as a chauffeur mechanic for Joan Newton Cuneo, one of the United States' first woman racing drivers.

== Racing Career ==
Disbrow raced in the first four Indianapolis 500s, with a best finish of 8th in 1913, and also in the 1910, 1911, and 1915 American Grand Prizes. He would have greater success in dirt track racing later in his career.

== Automotive Business Ventures ==
By 1917, Louis Disbrow would head Disbrow Motors Co. in Cleveland, Ohio. The marque's first car would be the Disbrow Special, powered by a Wisconsin engine. He would also sell spark plugs under the Disbrow Manufacturing Co. name.

== Later Life and Death ==
In 1925, an accident resulted in Louis Disbrow breaking both legs and being pronounced dead. But he regained consciousness by the time he was taken to a morgue. He would later die in earnest on July 9, 1939, at his home in Philadelphia, Pennsylvania.

== Motorsports career results ==
=== Indianapolis 500 results ===
Year	Car	Start	Qual	Rank	Finish	Laps	Led	Retired
1911	5	5	—	—	35	45	0	Crash FS
1912	5	24	76.540	23	18	67	0	Differ. pin
1913	31	23	82.760	10	8	200	0	Running
1914	1	24	86.790	28	16	128	0	Rod
Totals						440	0	

Starts	4
Poles	0
Front Row	0
Wins	0
Top 5	0
Top 10	1
Retired	3
