= John Jenkins (racing driver) =

American racing driver (1875–1945)

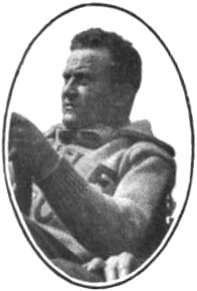
- Born: John William Jenkins; November 11, 1875 Springfield, Ohio, U.S.
- Died: November 26, 1945 (aged 70) Brownsville, Texas, U.S.

Champ Car career
- 9 races run over 5 years
- First race: 1909 Indianapolis Race #6 (Indianapolis)
- Last race: 1913 Columbus 200 (Columbus)
- First win: 1911 Hamilton County Trophy (Cincinnati)
| Wins | Podiums | Poles |
|---|---|---|
| 1 | 3 | 0 |

John William Jenkins (November 11, 1875 – November 26, 1945) was an American racing driver. According to some sources, he was born in Ohio of Welsh parentage. Other sources say that he was born in Cardiff, Wales, and emigrated to the United States, where he served in the armed forces. Official records hosted by www.ancestry.com suggest he was born in Brookfield Center, Ohio to parents who originally emigrated from Cardiff.

== Motorsports career results ==
=== Indianapolis 500 results ===
| Year | Car | Start | Qual | Rank | Finish | Laps | Led | Retired |
|---|---|---|---|---|---|---|---|---|
| 1912 | 14 | 11 | 80.820 | 13 | 7 | 200 | 0 | Running |
| 1913 | 18 | 17 | 82.840 | 8 | 25 | 13 | 0 | Crankshaft |
| Totals | | | | | | 213 | 0 | |

| Starts | 2 |
| Poles | 0 |
| Front Row | 0 |
| Wins | 0 |
| Top 5 | 0 |
| Top 10 | 1 |
| Retired | 1 |
