= Jack Tower =

American racing driver (1886–1950)

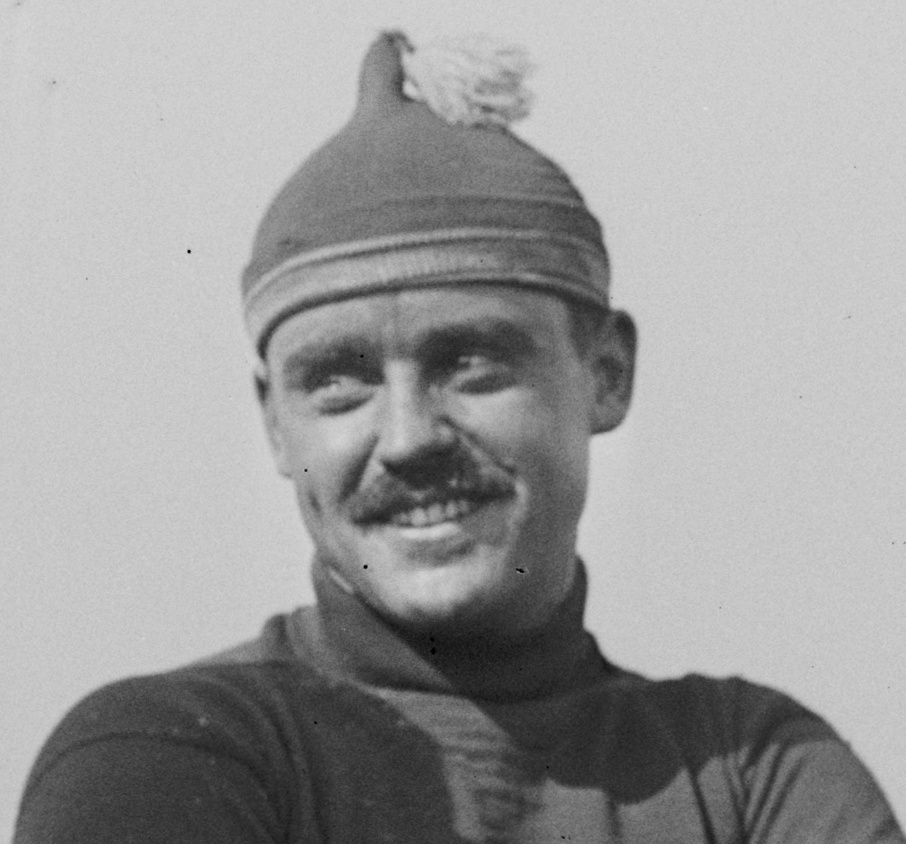
- Tower at the 1911 Indianapolis 500
- Born: Elmer Vernon Jack Tower; March 27, 1886 Escanaba, Michigan, U.S.
- Died: September 21, 1950 (aged 64) Eaton County, Michigan, U.S.

Champ Car career
- 3 races run over 3 years
- First race: 1911 Indianapolis 500 (Indianapolis)
- Last race: 1913 Indianapolis 500 (Indianapolis)
Wins	Podiums	Poles
0	1	0

Elmer Vernon Jack Tower (March 27, 1886 – September 21, 1950) was an American racing driver and riding mechanic from Escanaba, Michigan. Tower was the fastest qualifier at the 1913 Indianapolis 500, but started from the back row as the grid was determined by a blind draw. Tower was a manager at Studebaker, who also ran a cyclecar company. He remained involved in the car industry, and had many patents to his name which pertained to the automotive industry. These include a clutch disk, a clutch construction device, a transmission device, a clutch plate and a steering wheel invention.

== Motorsports career results ==
=== Indianapolis 500 results ===
Year	Car	Start	Qual	Rank	Finish	Laps	Led	Retired
1911	26	23	—	—	24	126	0	Flagged
1913	6	25	88.230	1	19	51	0	Crash T1
Totals						177	0	

Starts	2
Poles	0
Front Row	0
Wins	0
Top 5	0
Top 10	0
Retired	1
