= George Clark (racing driver) =

American racing driver (1877–1933)

- Born: George H. Clark; October 8, 1877 Bastrop, Texas, U.S.
- Died: October 5, 1933 (aged 55) Denton, Texas, U.S.

Champ Car career
- 11 races run over 5 years
- First race: 1910 Wheeler-Schebler Trophy (Indianapolis)
- Last race: 1915 Southern Sweepstakes (Oklahoma City)
Wins	Podiums	Poles
0	0	0

George H. Clark (October 8, 1877 – October 5, 1933) was an American racing driver.

== Motorsports career results ==
=== Indianapolis 500 results ===
Year	Car	Start	Qual	Rank	Finish	Laps	Led	Retired
1913	25	27	75.910	26	10	200	0	Running
Totals						200	0	

Starts	1
Poles	0
Front Row	0
Wins	0
Top 5	0
Top 10	1
Retired	0
