= Paul Zuccarelli =

Italian racing driver (1886–1913)

Paolo Zuccarelli
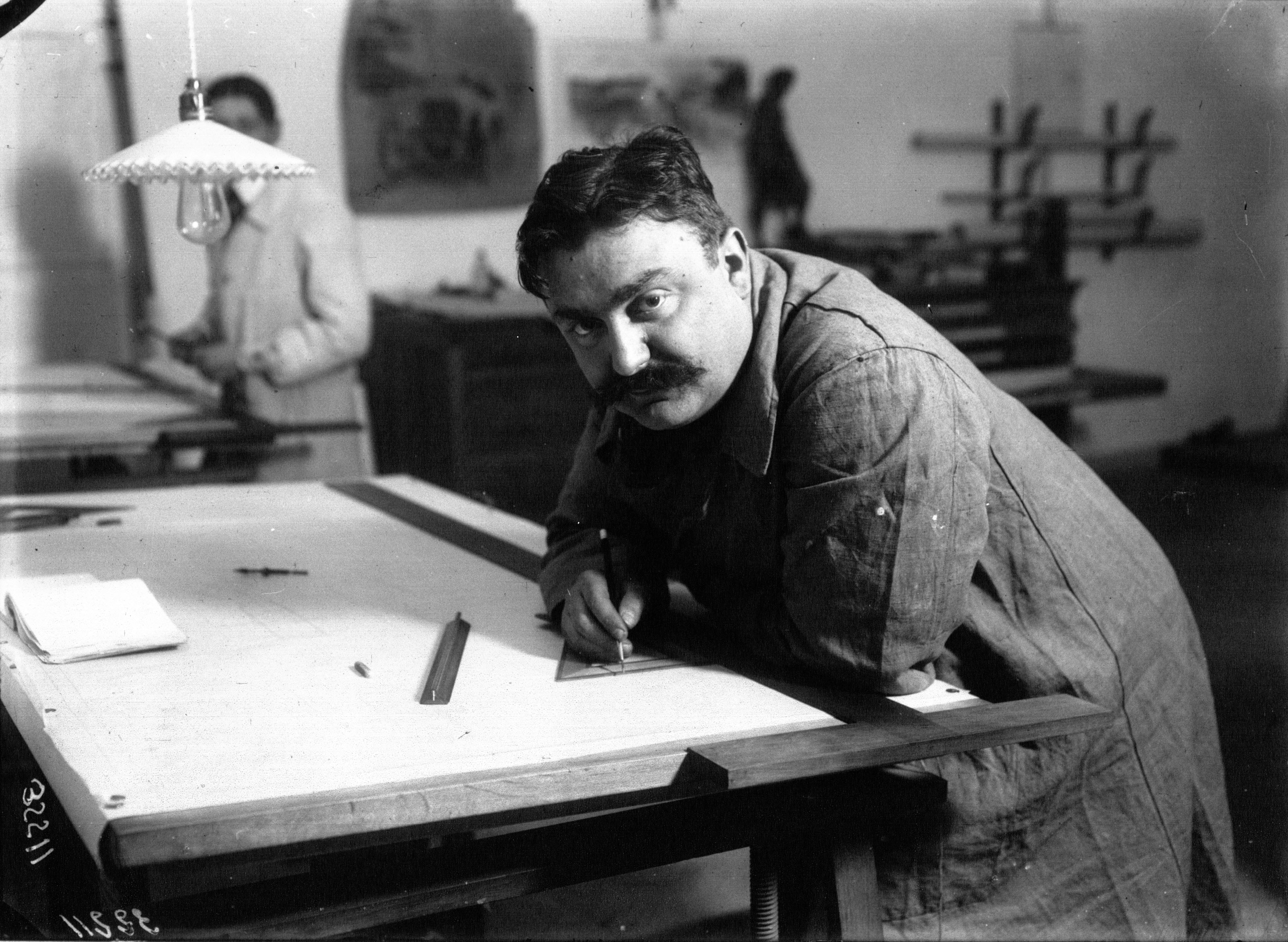
- Zuccarelli in 1912
- Born: Paolo Zuccarelli; 24 August 1886 Milan, Lombardy, Italy
- Died: 19 June 1913 (aged 26) Marcilly-la-Campagne, Eure, France

Champ Car career
- 1 race run over 1 year
- First race: 1913 Indianapolis 500 (Indianapolis)
Wins	Podiums	Poles
0	0	0

Paolo Zuccarelli (occasionally anglicized as Paul, 24 August 1886 – 19 June 1913) was an Italian racing driver. Zuccarelli graduated in engineering in Brescia and took on racing shortly afterwards. In 1910 he moved to France. He was among the first Europe-based racers to travel to the U.S. in 1913 to compete in the Indianapolis 500. Zuccarelli was killed while testing a car prior to the 1913 French Grand Prix at Amiens.

== Motorsports career results ==
=== Indianapolis 500 results ===
Year	Car	Start	Qual	Rank	Finish	Laps	Led	Retired
1913	15	26	85.830	4	22	18	0	Main bearing
Totals						18	0	

Starts	1
Poles	0
Front Row	0
Wins	0
Top 5	0
Top 10	0
Retired	1
