= 1913 Indianapolis 500 =

American motor race

3rd Indianapolis 500
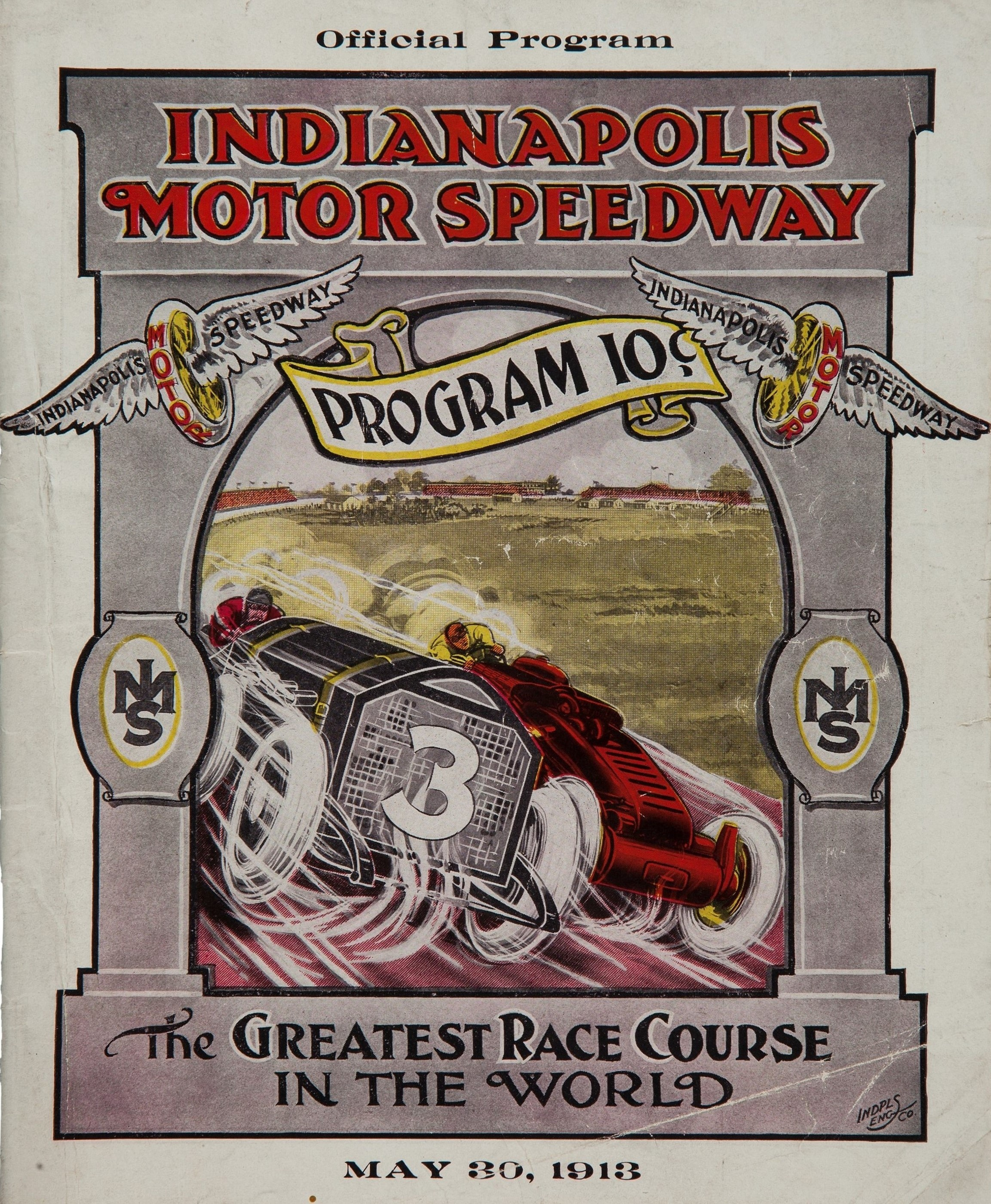

Indianapolis Motor Speedway

Indianapolis 500
- Sanctioning body: AAA
- Date: May 30, 1913
- Winner: Jules Goux
- Winning Riding Mechanic: Emil Begin
- Winning Entrant: Peugeot
- Winning time: 6:35:05
- Average speed: 75.933 mph (122.202 km/h)
- Pole position: Caleb Bragg
- Pole speed: N/A
- Most laps led: Jules Goux (138)

Pre-race
- Pace car: Stoddard-Dayton
- Pace car driver: Carl G. Fisher
- Starter: Charles P. Root
- Honorary referee: Laurence Enos
- Estimated attendance: 90,000

Chronology
Previous	Next
1912	1914

The Third International 500-Mile Sweepstakes Race was held at the Indianapolis Motor Speedway on Friday, May 30, 1913. Frenchman Jules Goux became the first foreign-born, and first European winner of the Indianapolis 500. His margin of victory of 13 minutes, 8 seconds (approximately 7 laps) over second place Spencer Wishart still stands, as of 2026, as the largest margin of victory in Indianapolis 500 history.

== Race Summary ==
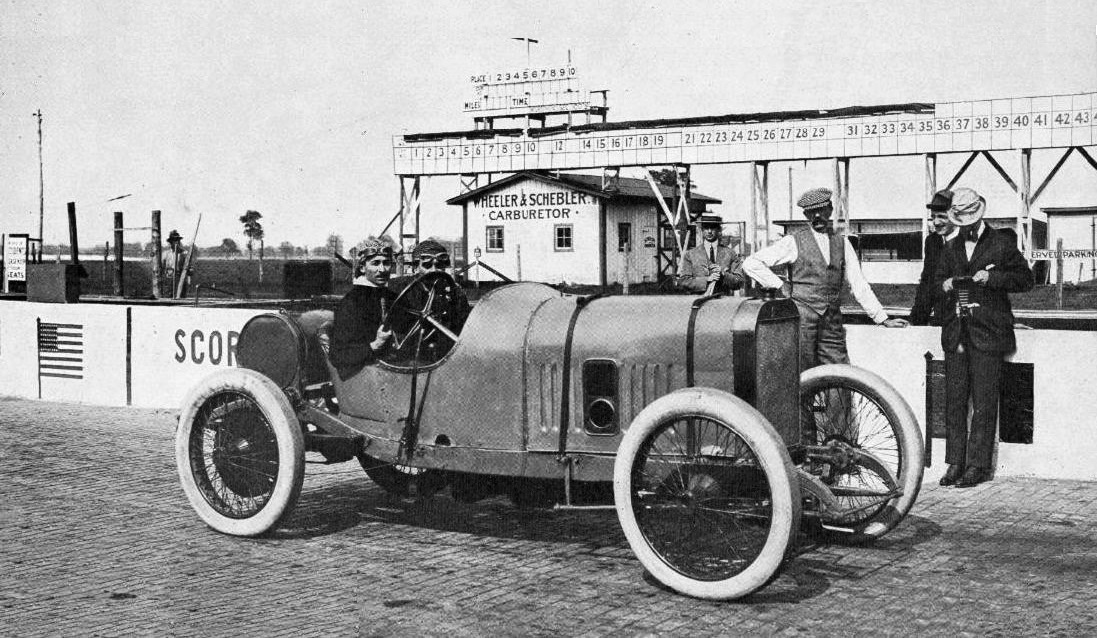
Jules Goux at 1913 Indy 500

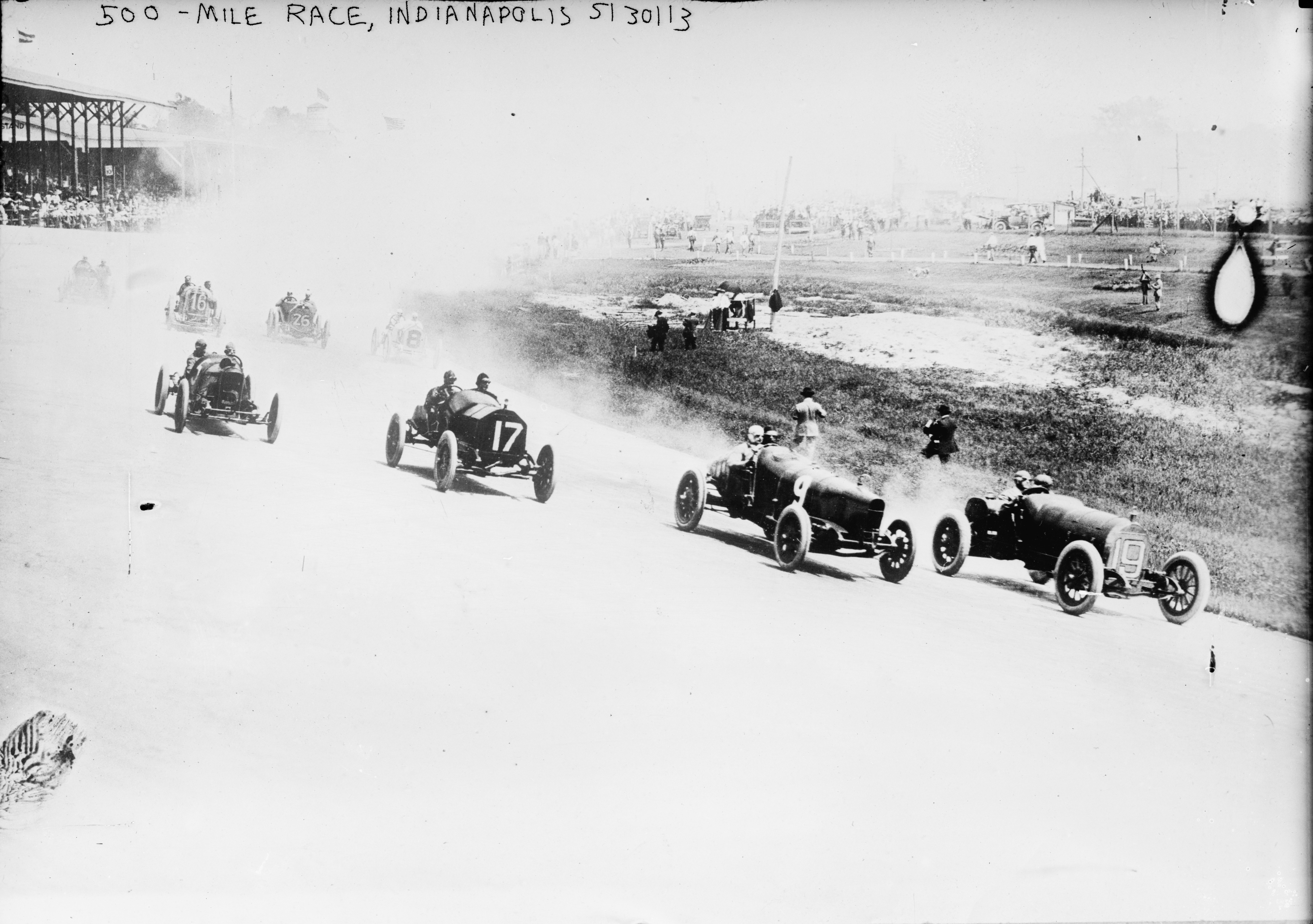

After the entries in the first two years of the Indianapolis 500 had been almost exclusively American, 1913 saw six drivers travel to the United States from Europe to enter, likely attracted by the impressive $20,000 first prize (equivalent to $651,515 in 2025). A total of 27 cars would meet the 75 mile per hour qualifying speed, led by Jack Tower at 88.230 mph. The starting grid was determined by a random draw of names, and Caleb Bragg would be given the pole.

Tower's car turned over on the southwest turn on lap 51, causing him to sustain a broken leg and his riding mechanic, Lee Dunning, to break three ribs. Bob Burman started the race as the favorite, and led 41 laps early, before his car caught fire on lap 55. Burman was able to repair his car and continue, however continuing problems led to several more stops and a replacement driver, who brought the car home in eleventh (unfortunately only the top ten finishers received prize money).

French-born Jules Goux, driving a car owned and manufactured by Peugeot (where his father was the factory Supervisor) would lead the race on four occasions. Bob Evans dueled with Goux, leading laps 125–135, but would be forced out of the race on lap 158 due to a mechanical problem. Goux would dominate the remainder of the race, leading 138 laps en route to a victory of a more than 13 minute margin, making him the first non-American winner of the 500. The car contained a four-cylinder dual overhead camshaft engine, which would serve as a model for many future entries. Goux would state after the race that his manager forced him to stay below the car's top speed, feeling the lead was safe. Spencer Wishart was the top finishing American in second, while two of the other European cars would finish fourth and fifth.

Rules at the time required the top ten drivers to finish the full 500 miles to receive prize money. This led to an interesting sight for spectators who remained after Goux's finish. Charlie Merz, in contention for second place, would have his car catch fire towards the end of lap 199. Merz, not wishing to surrender the prize money, drove the final lap on fire, while Harry Martin, his riding mechanic, crawled out on top of the hood of the still moving car to beat at the flames and release the straps that held the engine cover to allow the fire to be extinguished faster. Merz finished third. Martin would unfortunately be killed while helping test a car on the speedway less than two months later.

=== Champagne ===
Urban legends claim that race winner Jules Goux consumed "six bottles of champagne" en route to victory. However, that claim is believed to be exaggerated. Instead, during Goux's six pit stops, only four bottles (each 4/5 pint) were shared between himself and his riding mechanic Emil Begin, with each taking some sips, but likely not enough to become intoxicated. Other swigs were spit out using the champagne as a mouthwash. It was a hot day, and given the punishing conditions, during his first pit stop Goux was quoted as saying "Rustle me a pint of wine or I'll blow" After the race, in victory lane, Goux stated "The heat was terrible. I suffered and but for the wine, I should have been unable to drive this race." In subsequent years, AAA officials banned the consumption of alcohol during competition.

== Starting grid ==
Entries were required to complete one lap in excess of 75 mph in order to qualify. However, starting positions were determined by blind draw held the night preceding the race.

Driver		Far Inside		Inside Center		Outside Center		Far Outside	
Time	(mph)	Far Inside		Inside Center		Outside Center		Far Outside	
Row 1		(United States) Caleb Bragg		(France) Albert Guyot R		(United States) Billy Leisaw		(United States) Robert Evans R	
Row 1		1:43.05	87.34	1:51.46	80.75	1:55.36	78.02	1:49.74	82.01
Row 2		(United States) Don Herr R		(United States) Harry Grant		(France) Jules Goux R		(United States) Teddy Tetzlaff	
Row 2		1:48.64	82.84	1:58.48	75.96	1:44.62	86.03	1:52.14	80.26
Row 3		(United States) Bill Endicott		(United States) Harry Endicott		(United States) Billy Knipper		(United States) Ralph DePalma	
Row 3		1:45.02	85.70	1:57.88	76.35	1:52.14	80.26	1:57.96	76.30
Row 4		(Belgium) Théodore Pilette R		(United States) Gil Andersen		(United States) Willie Haupt R		(United States) Charlie Merz	
Row 4		1:59.17	75.52	1:48.92	82.63	1:51.49	80.72	1:46.56	84.46
Row 5		(United States) John Jenkins		(Italy) Vincenzo Trucco R		(United States) Spencer Wishart		(United States) Howdy Wilcox	
Row 5		1:48.643	82.84	1:49.84	81.94	1:49.77	81.99	1:50.48	81.46
Row 6		(United States) Bob Burman		(United States) Ralph Mulford		(United States) Louis Disbrow		(United States) Joe Nikrent R	
Row 6		1:46.93	84.17	1:51.40	80.79	1:48.75	82.76	1:54.08	78.89
Row 7		(United States) Jack Tower		(Italy) Paul Zuccarelli R		(United States) George Clark R			
Row 7		1:41.93	88.23	1:44.86	85.83	1:58.56	75.91		

== Box score ==
Finish	No.	Driver	Entrant	Chassis	Engine	Cyl	Displ (in^{3})	Color	Qual (mph)	Rank	Grid	Laps	Time/Status
1	16	(France) Jules Goux R	Peugeot	Peugeot	Peugeot	4	448	blue/white	86.03	3	7	200	6:35:05.00
2	22	(United States) Spencer Wishart (Ralph DePalma)	Mercer Automobile Company	Mercer	Mercer	4	300	yellow	81.99	13	19	200	+13:08.40
3	2	(United States) Charlie Merz (Earl Cooper)	Ideal Motor Car Company	Stutz	Wisconsin	4	400	white/red	84.46	6	16	200	+13:44.25
4	9	(France) Albert Guyot R	Sunbeam Motor Car Company	Sunbeam	Sunbeam	6	368	gray	80.75	18	2	200	+27:53.95
5	23	(Belgium) Théodore Pilette R	E.C. Patterson	Mercedes	Knight	4	251	gray/white	75.52	27	13	200	+45:08.00
6	12	(United States) Howdy Wilcox (Frank Fox)	Frank Fox	Pope-Hartford	Pope-Hartford	4	390	gray	81.46	15	20	200	+48:21.55
7	29	(United States) Ralph Mulford	E. J. Schroeder	Mercedes	Mercedes	4	449	gray	80.79	17	22	200	+53:00.50
8	31	(United States) Louis Disbrow (H. J. Kilpatrick)	J. I. Case T. M. Company	Case	Case	4	449	gray/red	82.76	10	23	200	+54:04.00
9	35	(United States) Willie Haupt R (Lee Oldfield)	Mason Motor Company	Duesenberg	Duesenberg	4	350	dark tan	80.72	19	15	200	+1:17:30.10
10	25	(United States) George Clark R (Tom Alley)	Tulsa Auto Manufacturing Company	Tulsa	Wisconsin	4	340	red/black	75.91	26	27	200	+1:21:09.25
11	4	(United States) Bob Burman (Hughie Hughes)	Keeton Motor Company	Keeton	Wisconsin	4	449	green/white	84.17	7	21	190	Flagged
12	3	(United States) Gil Andersen (Earl Cooper)	Ideal Motor Car Company	Stutz	Wisconsin	4	400	white/red	82.63	11	14	187	Camshaft gears
13	5	(United States) Robert Evans R (Lee Oldfield)	Mason Motor Company	Duesenberg	Duesenberg	4	350	dark tan	82.01	12	4	158	Clutch
14	17	(United States) Billy Leisaw (Lee Oldfield)	Will Tompson	Buick	Buick	4	318	orange/black	78.02	22	3	148	Loose rods
15	19	(United States) Caleb Bragg (Ralph DePalma)	Mercer Automobile Company	Mercer	Mercer	4	424	yellow	87.34	2	1	128	Pump shaft
16	10	(United States) Billy Knipper (Harry Grant)	Henderson Motor Car Company	Knipper	Duesenberg	4	350	azure blue	80.26	20	11	125	Clutch
17	27	(United States) Teddy Tetzlaff	Isotta Fraschini	Isotta Fraschini	Isotta Fraschini	4	444	red/green	81.30	16	8	118	Drive train
18	32	(United States) Joe Nikrent R (Eddie Hearne)	J. I. Case T. M. Company	Case	Case	4	449	gray/red	78.89	21	24	67	Burned bearing
19	6	(United States) Jack Tower	Mason Motor Company	Duesenberg	Duesenberg	4	350	dark tan	88.23	1	25	51	Crash T1
20	28	(Italy) Vincenzo Trucco R	Isotta Fraschini	Isotta Fraschini	Isotta Fraschini	4	444	red/green	81.94	14	18	39	Loose gas tank
21	1	(United States) Harry Endicott (Ed Madden)	Nyberg Auto Company	Nyberg	Nyberg	6	377	red	76.35	23	10	23	Transmission
22	45*	(Italy) Paul Zuccarelli R	Peugeot	Peugeot	Peugeot	4	448	blue/white	85.83	4	26	18	Main bearing
23	21	(United States) Ralph DePalma	Mercer Automobile Company	Mercer	Mercer	4	340	yellow	76.30	24	12	15	Burned bearing
24	26	(United States) Harry Grant	Isotta Fraschini	Isotta Fraschini	Isotta Fraschini	4	444	red/green	75.96	25	6	14	Gas tank
25	18	(United States) John Jenkins	Schacht Motor Car Company	Schacht	Schacht	4	299	red/white	82.84	9	17	13	Crankshaft
26	8	(United States) Don Herr R	Ideal Motor Car Company	Stutz	Wisconsin	4	400	white/red	82.84	8	5	7	Clutch shaft
27	33	(United States) Bill Endicott	J. I. Case T. M. Co.	Case	Case	6	448	gray/red	85.70	5	9	1	Drive shaft

R Indianapolis 500 Rookie

Note: Several sources claim Zuccarelli's entry to have carried the numerical designation #15. Photographs taken of entries qualified for the 1913 race, however, exhibit #45 prominently displayed on the Peugeot's front-facing engine grill.

=== Race statistics ===
Lap Leaders
Laps	Leader
1	Caleb Bragg
2–3	Bob Evans
4–14	Jules Goux
15–55	Bob Burman
56–95	Jules Goux
96–102	Gil Andersen
103–124	Jules Goux
125–135	Gil Andersen
136–200	Jules Goux

Total laps led
Laps	Leader
Jules Goux	138
Bob Burman	41
Gil Andersen	18
Bob Evans	2
Caleb Bragg	1

== Race details ==
- For 1913, riding mechanics were required.

== Notes ==
=== Works cited ===
- Indianapolis 500 Chronicle, 1999, Rick Pope
- 2006 Indianapolis 500 Official Program

=== References ===
1912 Indianapolis 500; Joe Dawson	1913 Indianapolis 500; Jules Goux	1914 Indianapolis 500; René Thomas
