= 1913 AAA Championship Car season =

Auto racing season

- AAA National Championship Trail

Season
- Races: 14
- Start date: January 1
- End date: September 9

Awards
- National champion: none declared
- Indianapolis 500 winner: (France) Jules Goux

The 1913 AAA Championship Car season consisted of 14 races, beginning in San Diego, California, on January 1 and concluding in Corona, California, on September 9. AAA did not award points towards a National Championship during the 1913 season, and did not declare a National Champion. Jules Goux was the winner of the Indianapolis 500.

The de facto National Champion as polled by the American automobile journal Motor Age, was Earl Cooper. Points were not awarded by the AAA Contest Board during the 1913 season. Cooper was named the champion by Chris G. Sinsabaugh, an editor at Motor Age, based upon merit and on track performance. A points table was created retroactively in 1927. At a later point, it was recognized by historians that these championship results should be considered unofficial.

== Schedule and results ==
Date	Race Name Distance (miles)	Track	Location	Type	Notes	Pole position	Winning driver
January 1	San Diego Race (183)	San Diego Road Race Course	San Diego, California	91.7 mile road course		Elmer Knox	George Hill
March 1	Point Loma Race (201)	Point Loma Road Race Course	San Diego, California	5.982 mile road course			Billy Carlson
May 30	International 500 Mile Sweepstakes	Indianapolis Motor Speedway	Speedway, Indiana	2.5 mile brick oval	Qualifications based upon demonstrated 75 mph single-lap speed, 27-car field	Caleb Bragg	Jules Goux
July 4	Columbus Race (200)	Driving Park	Columbus, Ohio	1 mile dirt oval	Harry Knight and his riding mechanic Milton Michaelis fatally injured		Ralph Mulford
July 5	Potlach Trophy Race (200)	Tacoma Road Race Course	Tacoma, Washington	3.423 mile road course			Earl Cooper
July 7	Montamarathon Trophy Race (249)	Tacoma Road Race Course	Tacoma, Washington	3.423 mile road course			Earl Cooper
July 28	Galveston Race 1 (100)	Denver Beach Course	Galveston, Texas	5 mile beach course			Louis Disbrow
July 29	Galveston Race 2 (100)	Denver Beach Course	Galveston, Texas	5 mile beach course			Armour Ferguson
July 30	Galveston Race 3 (100)	Denver Beach Course	Galveston, Texas	5 mile beach course			Louis Disbrow
August 9	Santa Monica Road Race (445)	Santa Monica Road Race Course	Santa Monica, California	8.417 mile road course		Gaston Morris	Earl Cooper
August 29	Chicago Auto Club Trophy Race (302)	Elgin Road Race Course	Elgin, Illinois	8.384 mile road course	231-300 cu in.	Joe Dawson	Ralph DePalma
August 30	Elgin National Trophy Race (302)	Elgin Road Race Course	Elgin, Illinois	8.384 mile road course	450 cu in.	Bill Endicott	Gil Andersen
September 9	Corona Race 1 (302)	Grand Boulevard	Corona, California	2.768 mile road course	Free-for-all		Earl Cooper
September 9	Corona Race 2 (252)	Grand Boulevard	Corona, California	2.768 mile road course	450 cu in.		Earl Cooper

== Leading National Championship standings ==
The points paying system for the 1909–1915 and 1917–1919 season were retroactively applied in 1927 and revised in 1951 using the points system from 1920.

#	Driver	Sponsor	Points
1	Earl Cooper	Stutz	2710
2	Jules Goux	Peugeot	1000
3	Ralph Mulford	Mason	770
4	Ralph DePalma	Mercer	715
5	Spencer Wishart	Mercer	690

== General references ==
- http://www.champcarstats.com/year/1913.htm accessed 8/21/15
- http://www.teamdan.com/archive/gen/indycar/1913.html accessed 8/21/15
