= Brazier (name) =

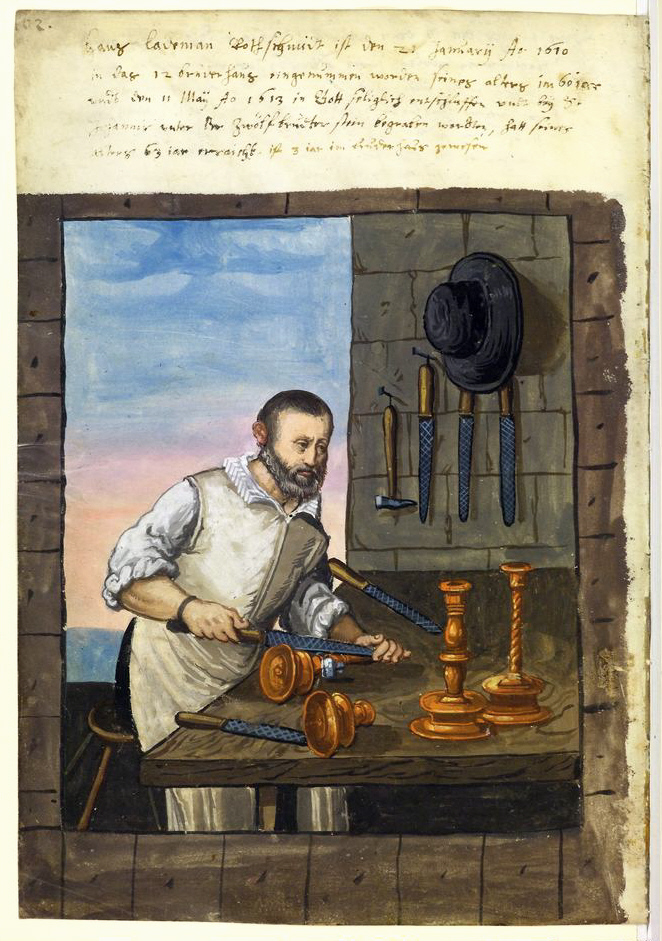

Origin
- Language: French
- Meaning: brazier, worker in brass
- Region of origin: France

Other names
- Variant forms: Mednikov; Kotler; Kottler; Smith

Brazier is an occupational surname of French origin, meaning "a worker in brass". It is the anglicised version of the French surname Brasier. The surname may refer to:

- Alan Brazier (1924–1999), English cricketer
- Annie Olive Brazier (1871–1957), English journalist and author
- Arthur M. Brazier (1921–2010), American bishop
- Bobby Brazier (born 2003), English actor and model
- Brendan Brazier (born 1975), Canadian athlete
- Brook Brasier (1879–1940), Irish politician
- Caroline Brazier (born 1971), Australian actress
- Caroline Brazier (librarian), Scottish librarian
- Colin Brazier (footballer) (born 1957), English footballer
- Colin Brazier (born 1968), British journalist
- Donald H. Brazier Jr. (born 1931), American politician
- Donavan Brazier (born 1997), American runner
- Eugénie Brazier (1895–1977), French chef
- Frank Brazier (1934–2021), Australian Olympic cyclist
- Graham Brazier (1952–2015), New Zealand musician
- Harold Brazier (born 1955), American boxer
- James Brazier (c. 1926–1958), African-American murdered by police in Dawson, Georgia
- Jeff Brazier (born 1979), English television presenter
- John Brazier (1842–1930), Australian zoologist
- Joseph Brazier, British gun manufacturer
- Julian Brazier (born 1953), British politician
- Kelly Brazier (born 1989), New Zealand rugby player
- Margaret Brazier (1950–2025), British legal scholar
- Marie-Luce Brasier-Clain (born 1959), French politician
- Marion Howard Brazier (1850–1935), American journalist, editor, lecturer, clubwoman
- Martin Brasier (1947–2014), British biologist
- Mary Brazier (1904–1995), American neuroscientist
- Matt Brazier (1976–2019), English football player
- Nicolas Brazier (1783–1838), French writer
- Robert Boyd Brazier (1916–1942), American sailor
- Robert H. B. Brazier (died 1837), British surveyor
- Rodney Brazier (born 1946), British lawyer
- Ryan Brasier (born 1987), American professional baseball pitcher
- Will Brazier (born 1983), American rugby player
- William Brazier (1755–1829), British cricketer

== See also ==
- Brasier, French automobile manufacturer
- Brazier (hieroglyph)
- Le Brasier, a 1991 French film
- Theresa May (née Brasier, born 1956), British prime minister
