= Jules Barillier =

French racing driver (1880–1914)

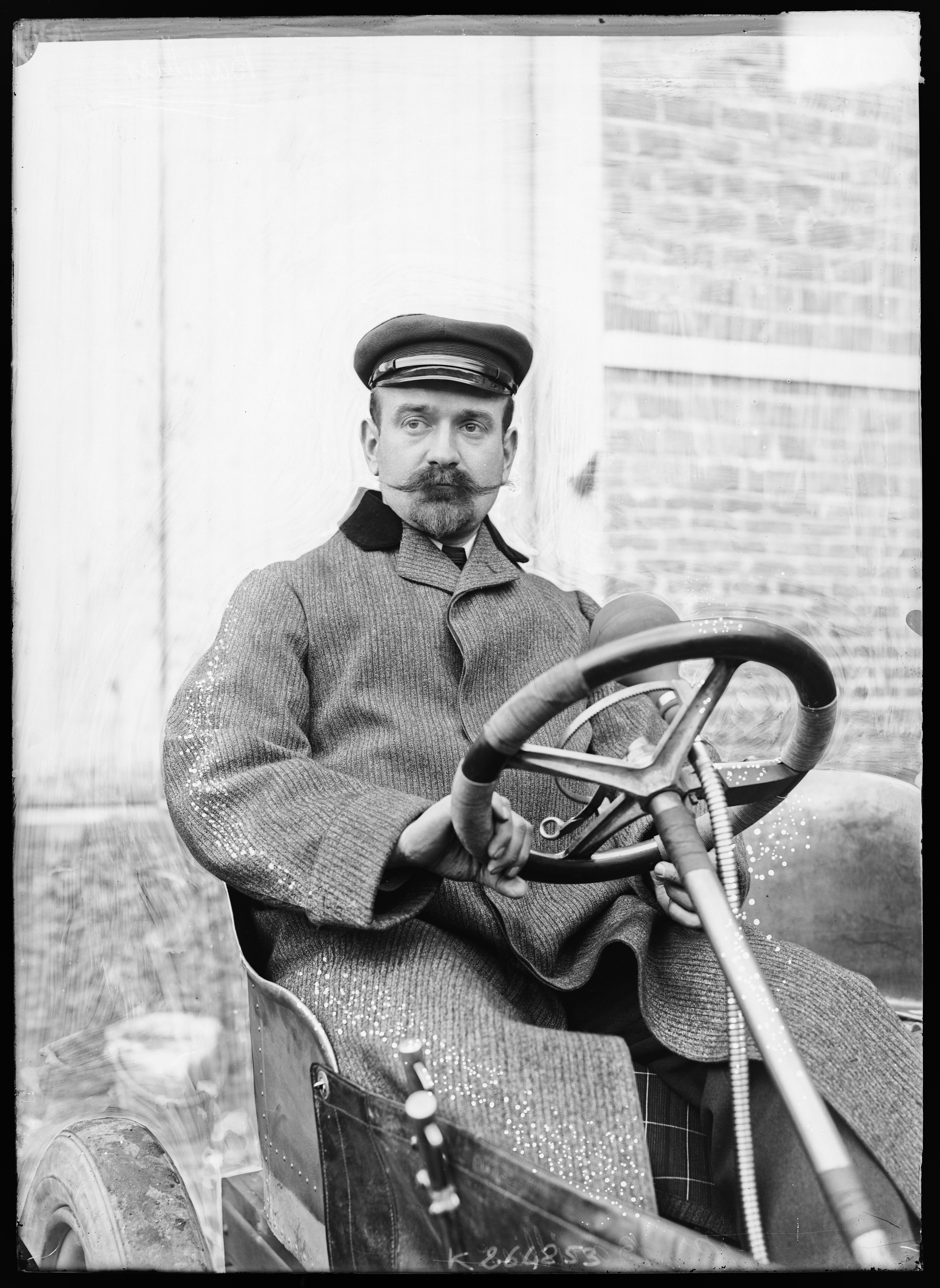
- Barillier in March 1906
- Born: Jules César Etienne Barillier; 17 September 1880 Marchais, Aisne, France
- Died: 6 November 1914 (aged 34) Saint-Hubert, Marne

Jules Barillier was a French racing driver, who came fourth in the first-ever Grand Prix.

== Career ==
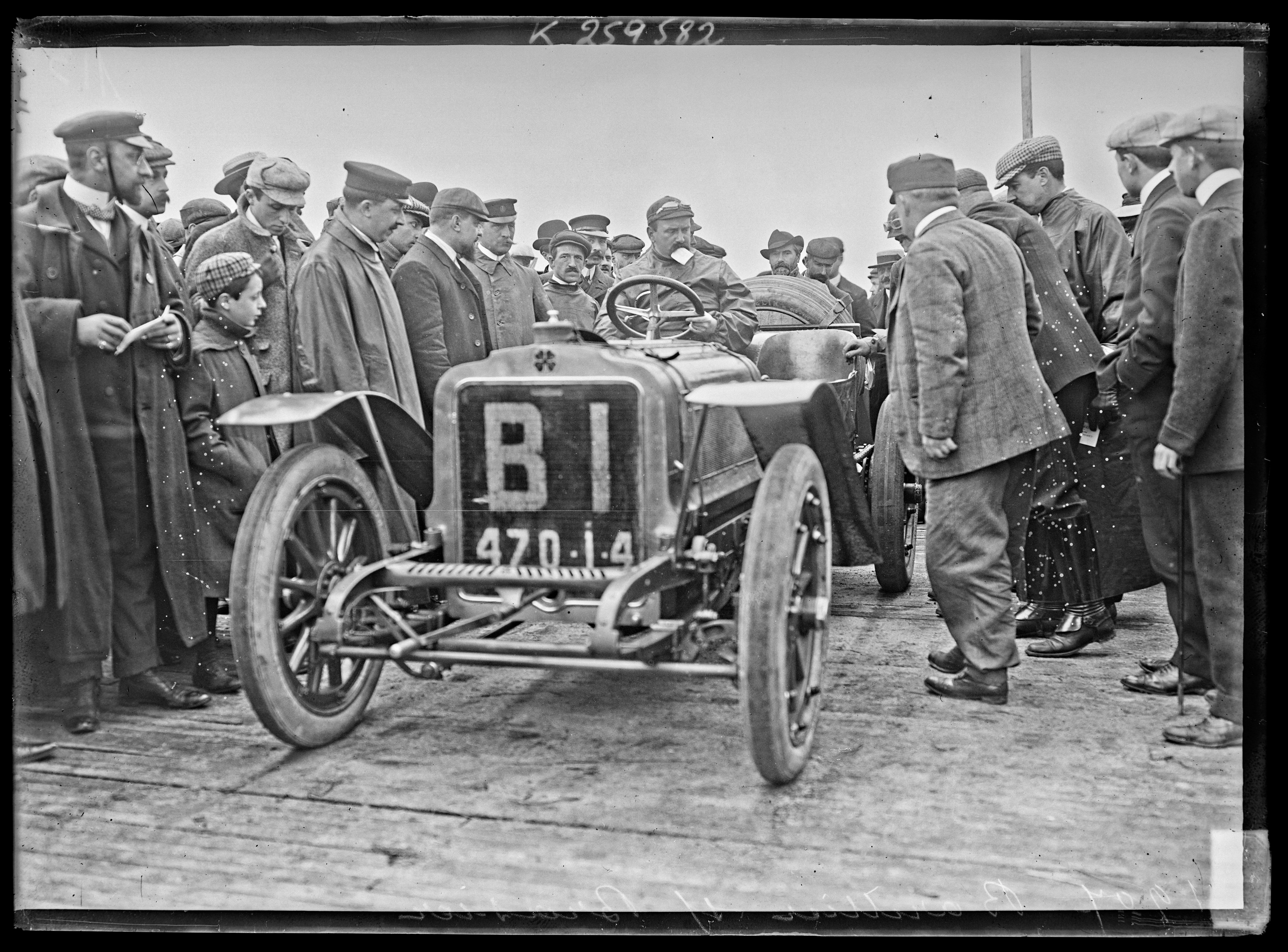
Barillier on his Brasier at the 1907 Grand Prix

An employee of the Georges Richard marque, Barillier first came to attention by running 2nd in the voiturette class of the 1903 Paris-Madrid race (behind Masson's Clément, driving a 2.3 litre model designed by Richard Brasier, when it was stopped at Bordeaux. At the end of the year, he took part for the marque in a speed trial at Chateau-Thierry, finishing 6th in the Light Car category (400–600kg).

After the split between Richard and Brasier, Barillier remained with the latter, and finished 4th in the 1906 Grand Prix - the first of the Brasiers to finish. Barillier also took part in the 1906 Circuit des Ardennes (finishing 4th, fewer than 20 seconds behind Henri Rougier in 3rd) and in the 1907 French Grand Prix, in which he had the honour of leading the Brasier team. He finished 7th, but this time well beaten by team-mate Paul Baras, and does not seem to have raced again.
