= Robert Brazier =

Robert Brazier may refer to:

- Robert Boyd Brazier (1916–1942), U.S. Navy sailor
  - USS Robert Brazier, a 1944 John C. Butler-class destroyer escort
- Robert H. B. Brazier (died 1837), English surveyor

== See also ==
- Bobby Brazier (born 2003), English actor and model
