= Vivinus =

Range of cars

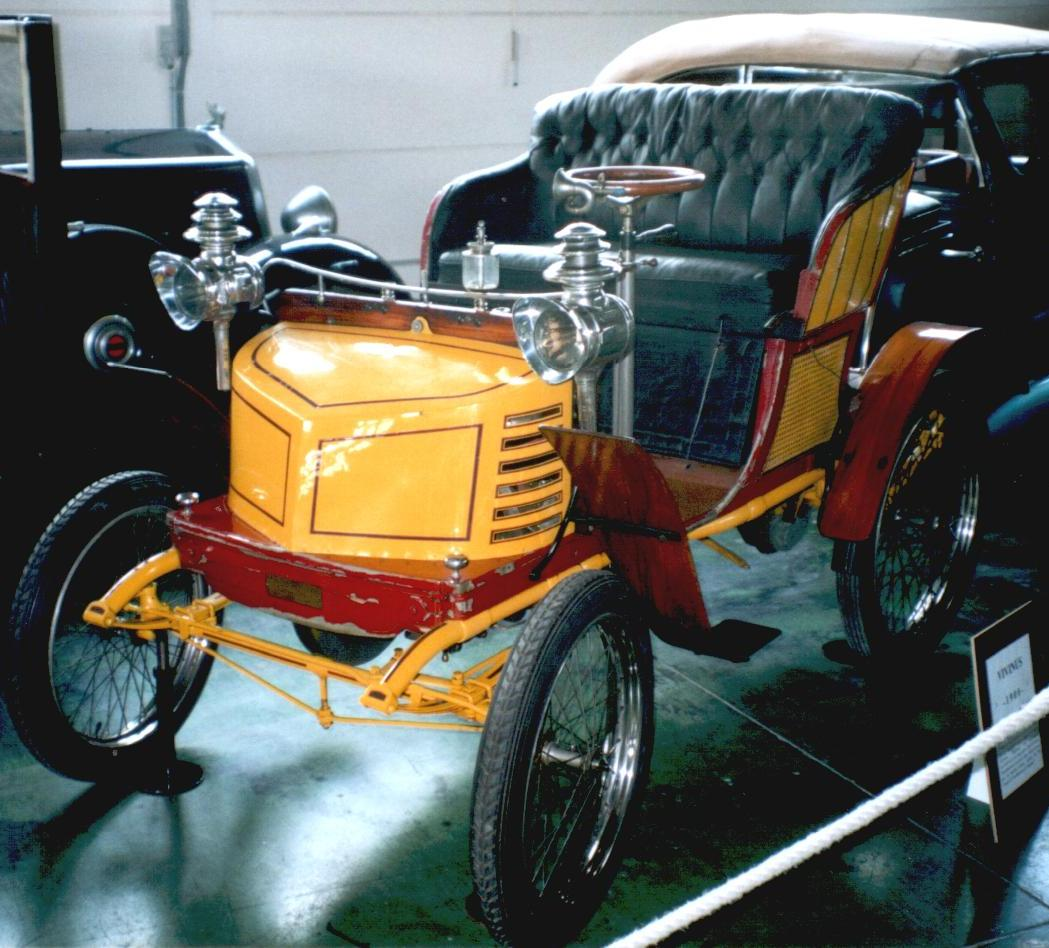
Vivinus 1900

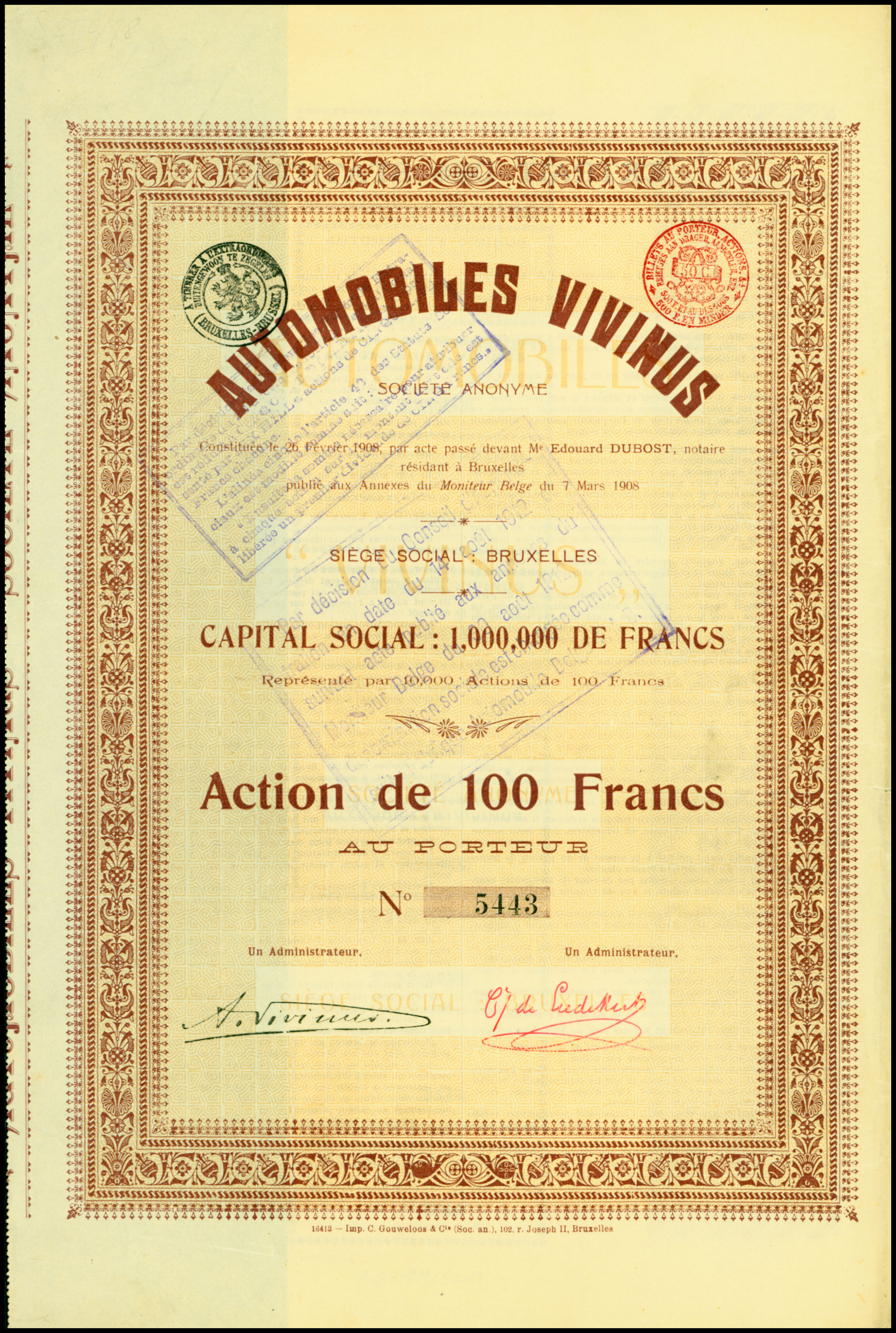
Share of the Automobiles Vivinus SA, issued 1908

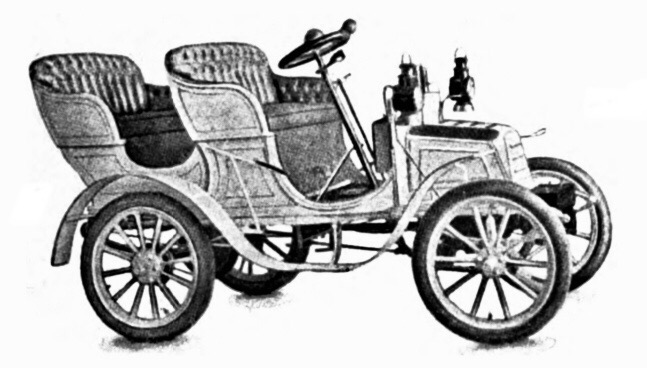
Vivinus phaeton (1902)

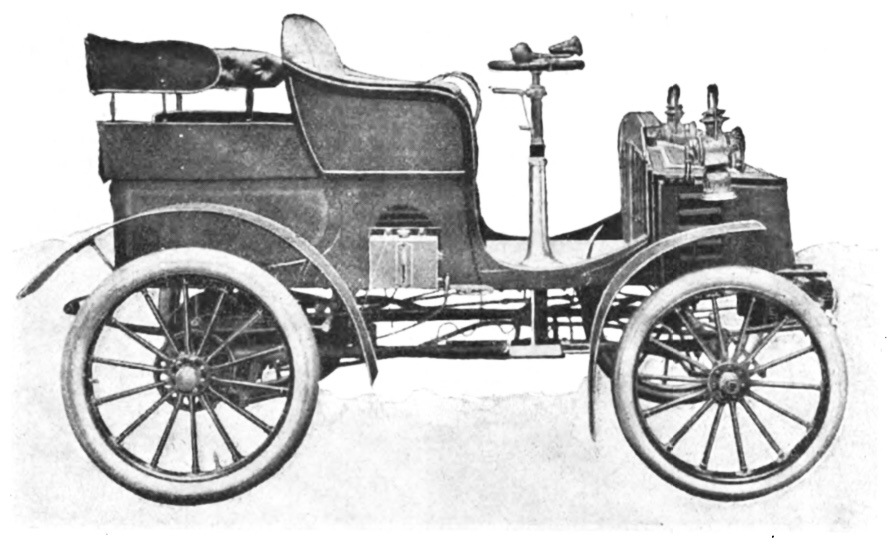
Vivinus duc tonneau (1902)

Vivinus cars were made by Ateliers Vivinus S.A., a company founded in 1899 in Schaerbeek, Brussels. The company was renamed Automobiles Vivinus S.A. in 1908.

The owner, Alexis Vivinus (1860-1929), had made bicycles in the 1890s and become an importer of Benz. From 1895 he started to make his own range of cars. These were belt-driven voiturette models with a 785 cc single-cylinder engine and 2-speed transmission by belt drive. Licences to make his designs were sold to firms such as New Orleans of England, Georges Richard of France and De Dietrich in Germany.

From 1907 a range of more conventional 4-cylinder cars were made with shaft drive, along with motorcycles and aero engines.

The company went into liquidation in 1912. The workshop was taken over by Fabrique d'automobile belge. Vivinus himself later joined Minerva.
