= Unic =

French manufacturer of cars etc.

Unic (société anonyme des automobiles Unic)
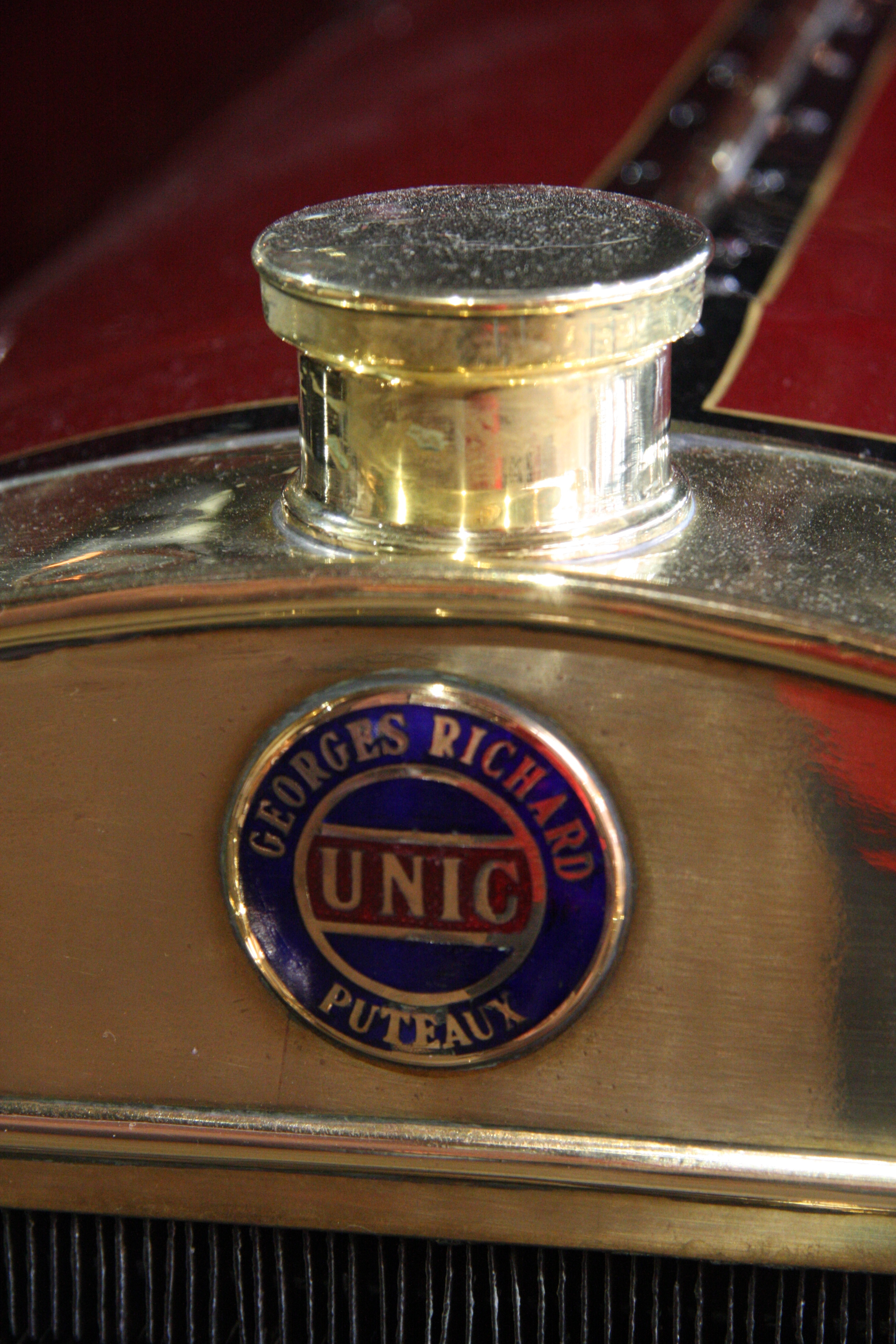

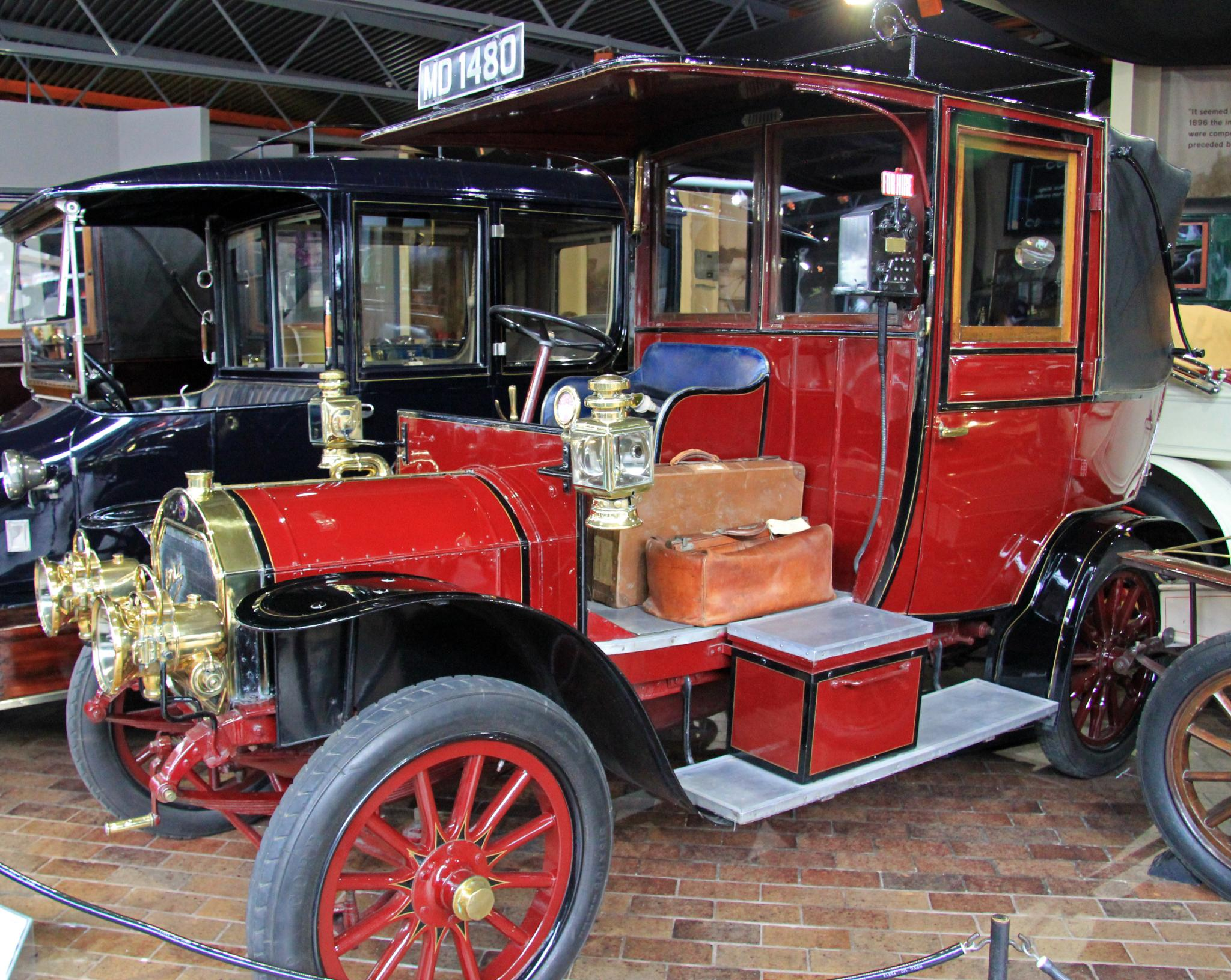
- Unic Taxicab (1908)
- Founded: 1905
- Defunct: 1938 (last automobiles manufactured: continued as a manufacturer of commercial vehicles); 1952 (sold to Simca)
- Headquarters: Puteaux, France
- Key people: Georges Richard (founder); Baron Henri de Rothschild (main investor)
- Products: Automobiles commercial vehicles

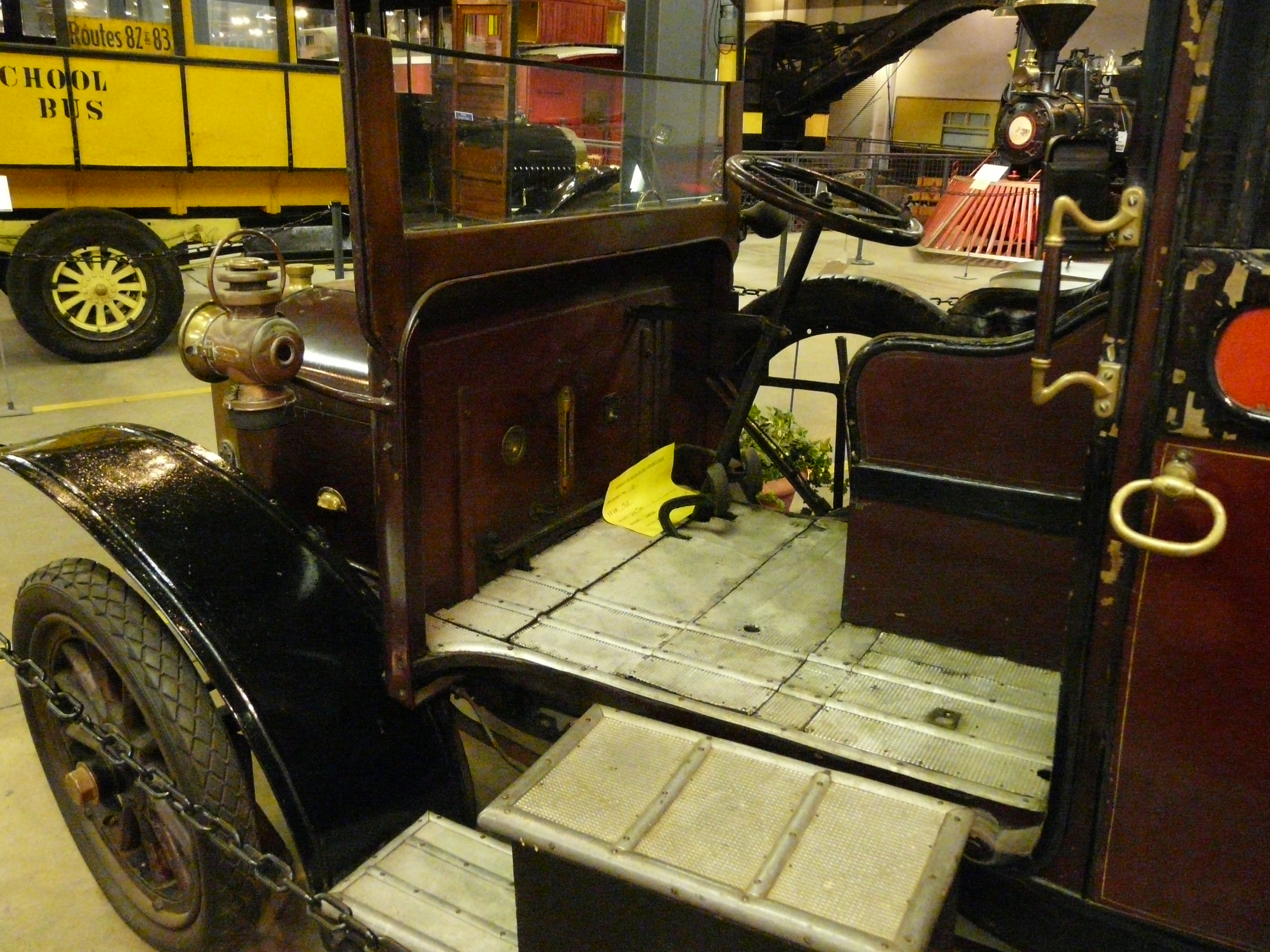
Taxicab 1909

Unic was a French manufacturer, founded in 1905 and active as an automobile producer until July 1938. After this the company continued to produce commercial vehicles, retaining its independence for a further fourteen years before being purchased in 1952 by Henri Pigozzi, who was keen to develop Unic as a commercial vehicle arm of the then flourishing Simca business.

== Origins ==
Unic was founded by Georges Richard after he left Richard-Brasier. In 1905 Richard had a meeting with the entrepreneur-financier Baron Henri de Rothschild and obtained funding for the creation of the "société anonyme des automobiles Unic", based at Puteaux. The objective was to manufacture "unique" (rather than mainstream) vehicles, and at the start the company made only light cars and taxis with two-cylinder and four-cylinder engines.

The taxi business would remain important to Unic for more than three decades, while Rothschild's steady financial support through good times and bad, provided stability which sustained the business, critically during the immediate post-war years.

== Growth and diversification ==
Although the manufacturer's initial range was restricted to light cars, their popularity as taxis led to the production of delivery vans and other small utility style vehicles. The 1943 cc 12 CV (9 kW) four-cylinder model (used mainly as a taxi) was extremely successful and survived in production for nearly 20 years. (The engine was enlarged later to 2120 cc.) During World War I, taxis made by the company participated in the Marne operation. After World War I, a new four-cylinder (1847 cc) was offered, along with the taxis.

== First truck and founder's death ==
In 1922 the firm introduced a three-ton truck, called the Unic MSC, which marked the start of a switch towards production of larger commercial vehicles. 1922 was also the year when the founder of Unic, Georges Richard, died while awaiting transfer to a Paris clinic, following a motor accident en route to Rouen. Georges Dubois, hitherto in charge of vehicle testing, took on responsibility for the business.

== Passenger cars in the 1920s ==
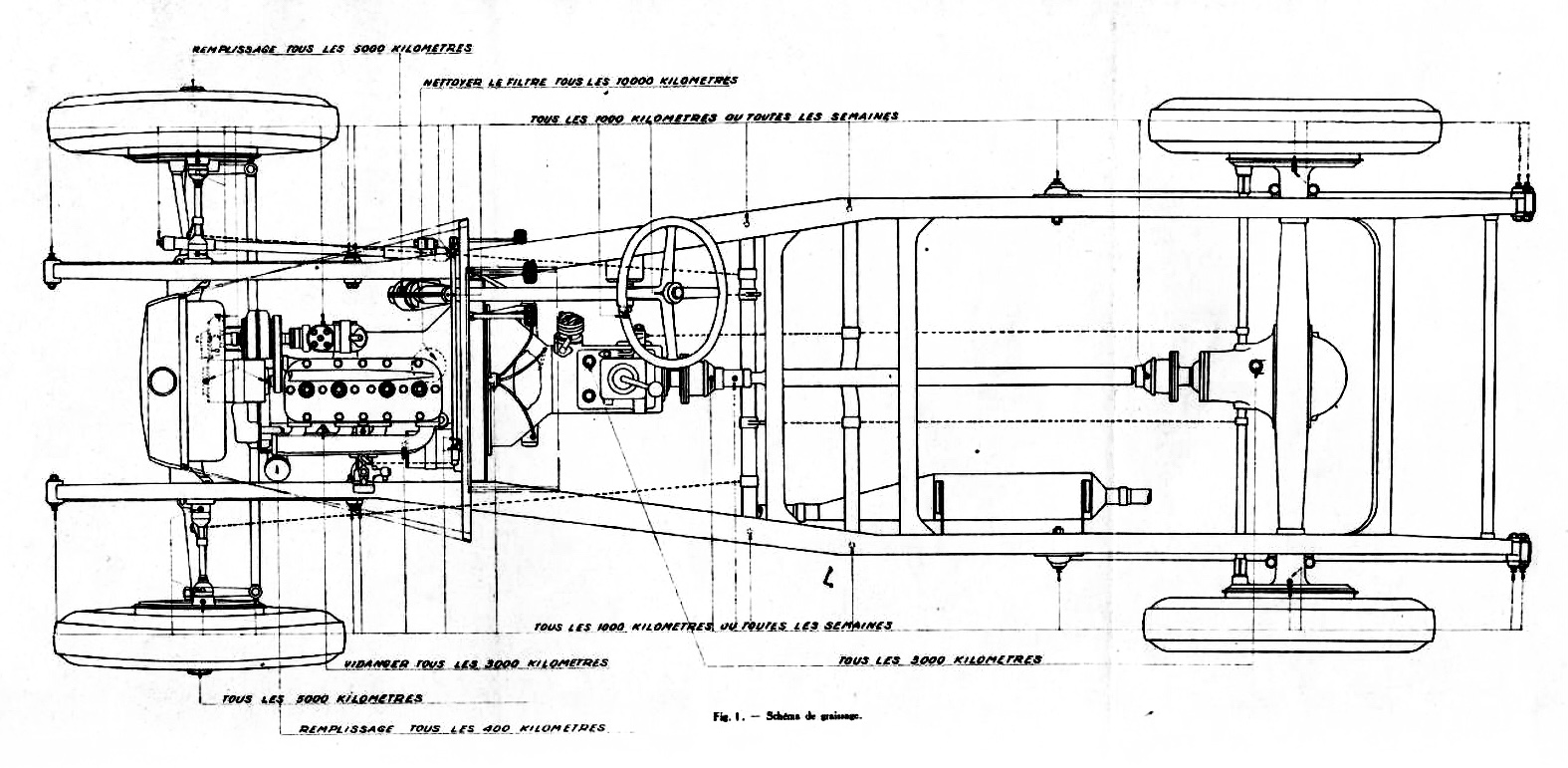
Unic "Type L3T" (1925–1934)

During the 1920s, a 1997 cc sports model was marketed and in some models sleeve valve engines were used.

By the time of the 19th Paris Motor Show, in October 1924, Unic were exhibiting three passenger cars. All had four cylinder engines, although large four-cylinder engines such as that fitted in the 16HP model were by now seen as rather old fashioned:

- Unic "Type L1T" 10 CV/HP: 4-cylinder 1843 cc: wheelbase 3,050 mm (120.1 in)
- Unic "Type L3T" 11 CV/HP: 4-cylinder 2000 cc: wheelbase 3,050 mm (120.1 in)
- Unic 16 CV/HP: 4-cylinder 3450 cc: wheelbase 3,450 mm (135.8 in)

Four years later, at the 22nd Paris Motor Show, only one of the two cars on show was fitted with a four-cylinder engine. This was an evolution of the two-litre model exhibited in 1924, now branded as the Unic "Type L9", with a 3,150 mm (124.0 in) wheelbase and usually fitted with "Torpedo" or "Berline" (saloon/sedan) bodies. However, for the 1929 model year attention was now focused on the company's first eight-cylinder model. The new Unic 14 CV/HP "Type H1" featured a 2 1/2-litre straight-eight power unit and sat on a substantial 3,460 mm (136.2 in) wheelbase. It was priced at 55,000 francs in bare chassis form.

== Passenger cars in the 1930s ==
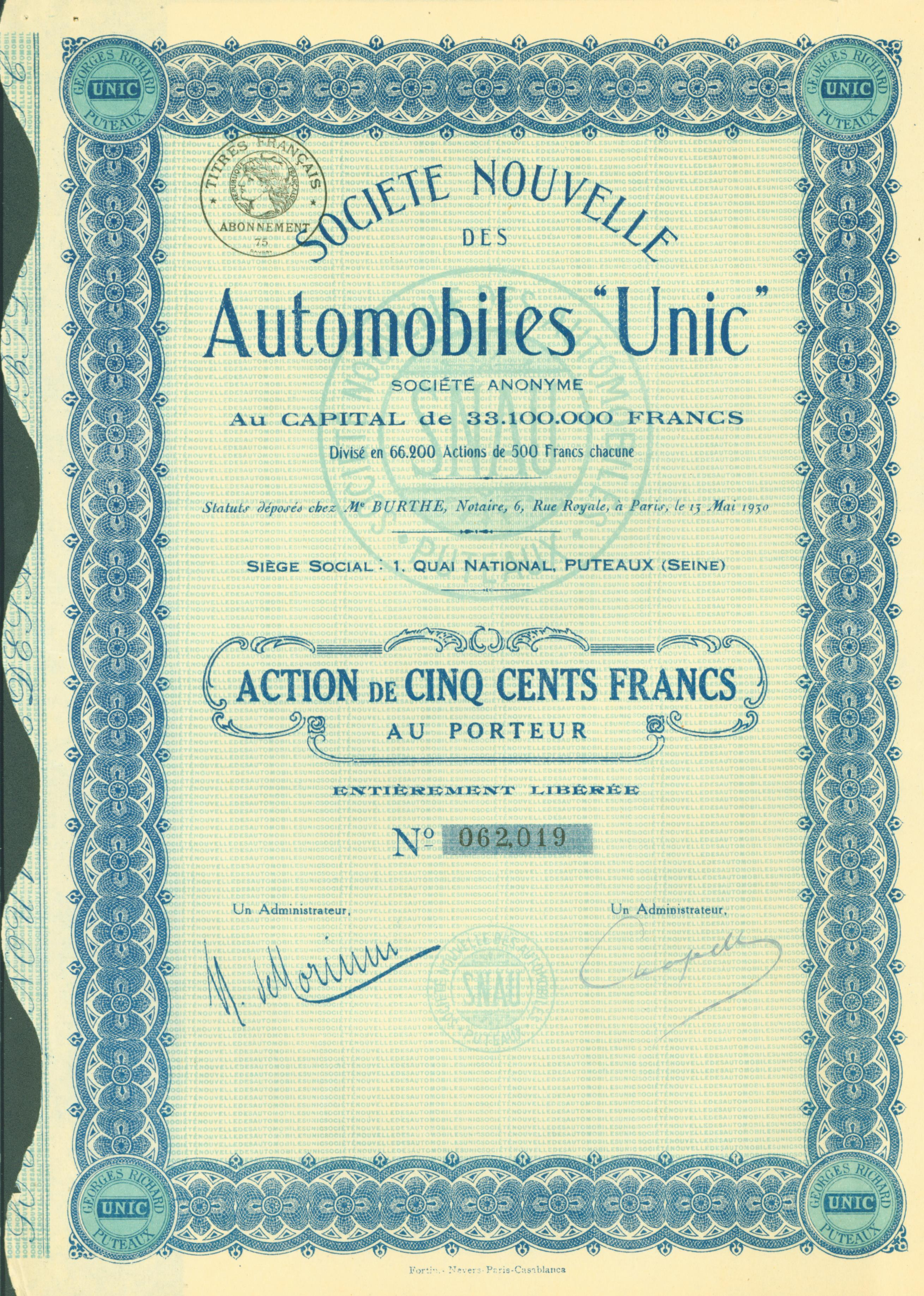
Share of the Societe Nouvelle des Automobiles "Unic", issued 13 May 1930

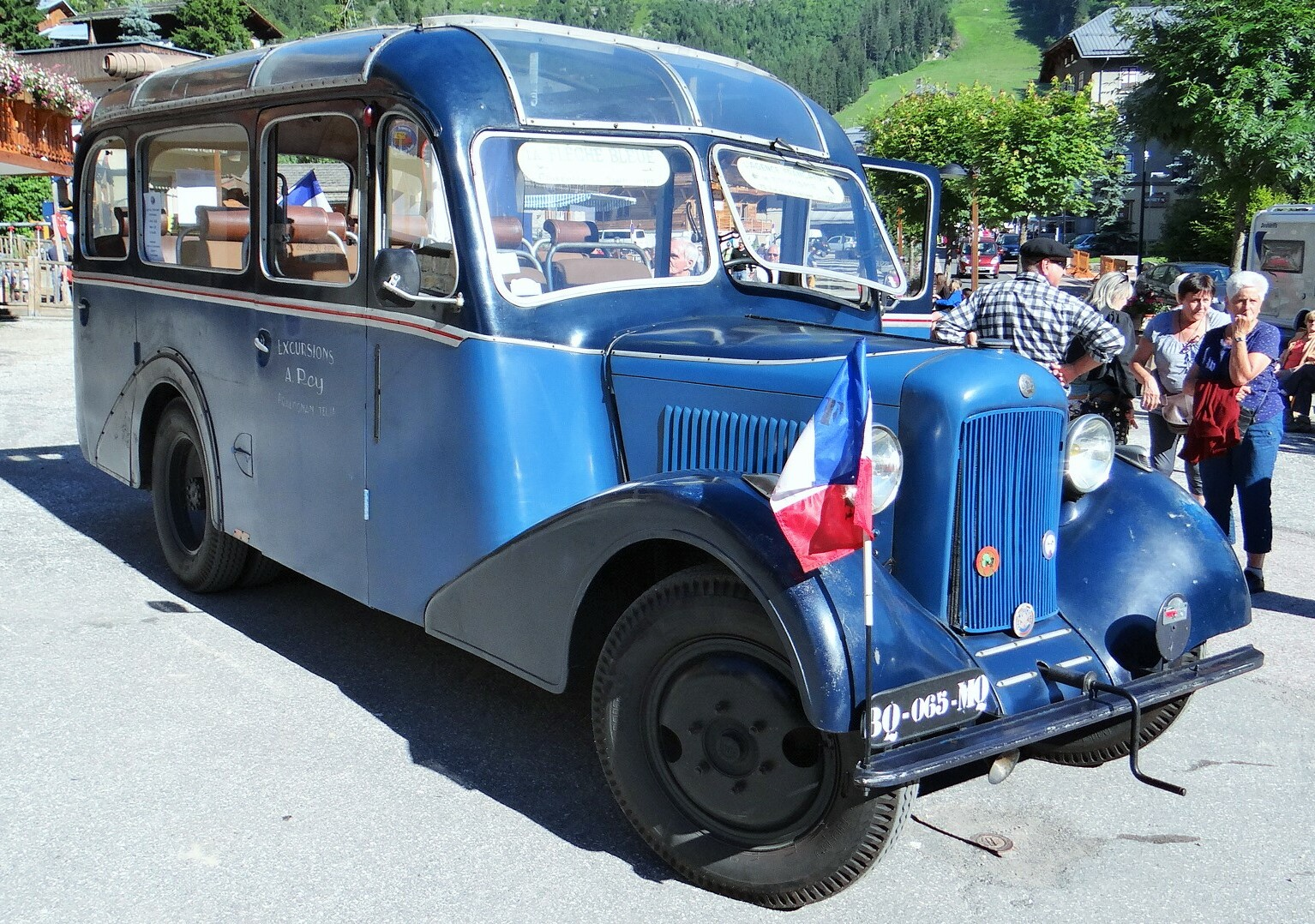
Tour bus UNIC 1937 L20

The eight-cylinder Unic "Type H1" introduced in 1928 was progressively updated in accordance with the changing tastes of the time: by 1933 car had evolved into the Unic "Type H3" and the engine size had grown from 2 1/2 litres to 2646 cc. October 1933 was nevertheless the last time an eight-cylinder passenger car would appear on the Unic show stand.

For the next few years the company focused on four-cylinder cars in the 11 CV/HP tax band, just as they had through the mid-1920s. For 1934 Unic announced their new "Type U4" model, featuring a two-litre side-valve engine and now also employing a four-speed transmission. The body-work of the standard five-seater "berline" (sedan/saloon) was no longer completely flat-backed, but the proportions of the car may have drawn criticism, since between the car's October 1933 launch and May 1934, the rear overhang was slightly increased, while at the front a slightly raked grill replaced the flat one, and the overall profile became a little more streamlined. In addition to this passenger car, Unic continued to produce through 1934 a similarly sized taxi of "great robustness".

== Final year of car production ==
In March 1937 Unic updated their four-cylinder passenger car model for the last time, and for the 1937 October Motor Show the six-cylinder model was also given a more streamlined look, in line with the fashion of the time. By this time the passenger car range was down to just these two models. The Unic Type U4D was a four-cylinder 2,150 (12CV) car which featured overhead valves and offered a maximum output of 55 hp (41 kW), supported by a robust, rather traditional chassis with a 3,160 mm (124.4 in) wheelbase. The imposing six-cylinder Unic Type U6C provided 85 hp (63 kW) from a 3,000 cc engine (17CV), transmitted via an electromagnetic "Cotal" preselector gear box, with a choice of wheelbase lengths between 3,200 mm (126.0 in) and 3,370 mm (132.7 in).

The appeal of Unic passenger cars by this time derived not from technical brilliance nor from stunning originality. Those who appreciated the cars were impressed by excellent reliability resulting from a meticulous approach taken during the production process. Also admired were their elegant spacious bodies, most of which came from the coach builder Letourneur et Marchand or from their subsidiary, Autobineau. Unic cars by now were not being sold in large numbers and this was reflected in the price. At the 1937 Motor Show the standard steel-bodied Unic Type U-4 D with its 12CV engine was priced at 53,750 francs (or 35,500 francs in bare chassis form). The slightly more powerful 13CV Talbot Type T4 "Minor" was listed at 42,500 Francs (or 35,000 Francs in bare chassis form), while from the top end of the Citroën range a long wheel base "familiale" version of the Traction 11CV Longue could be had for 28,900 francs including the body, while prototype testing was already well under way of a 2867 cc (15/16CV) version of the aggressively priced and marketed Citroën Traction. Few customers in this class were willing to pay the price for the Unic's virtues of dependability, style and space, and Unic passenger car production ceased in July 1938.

After 1938 Unic concentrated in the truck business, being one of the leading French makes. In 1966 it was taken over by the Italian company Fiat and eventually merged into Iveco in 1975.

Passenger cars

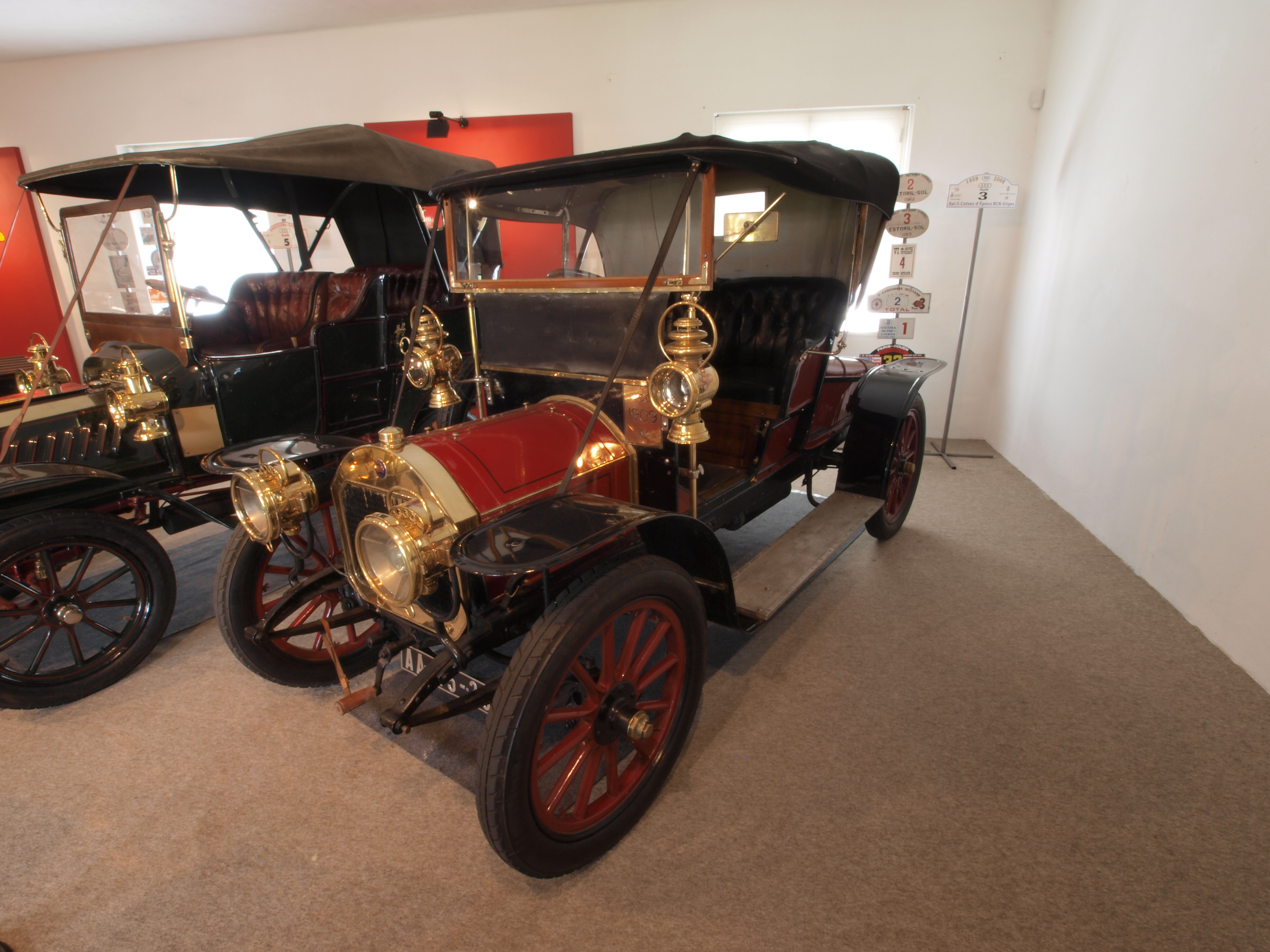
1909

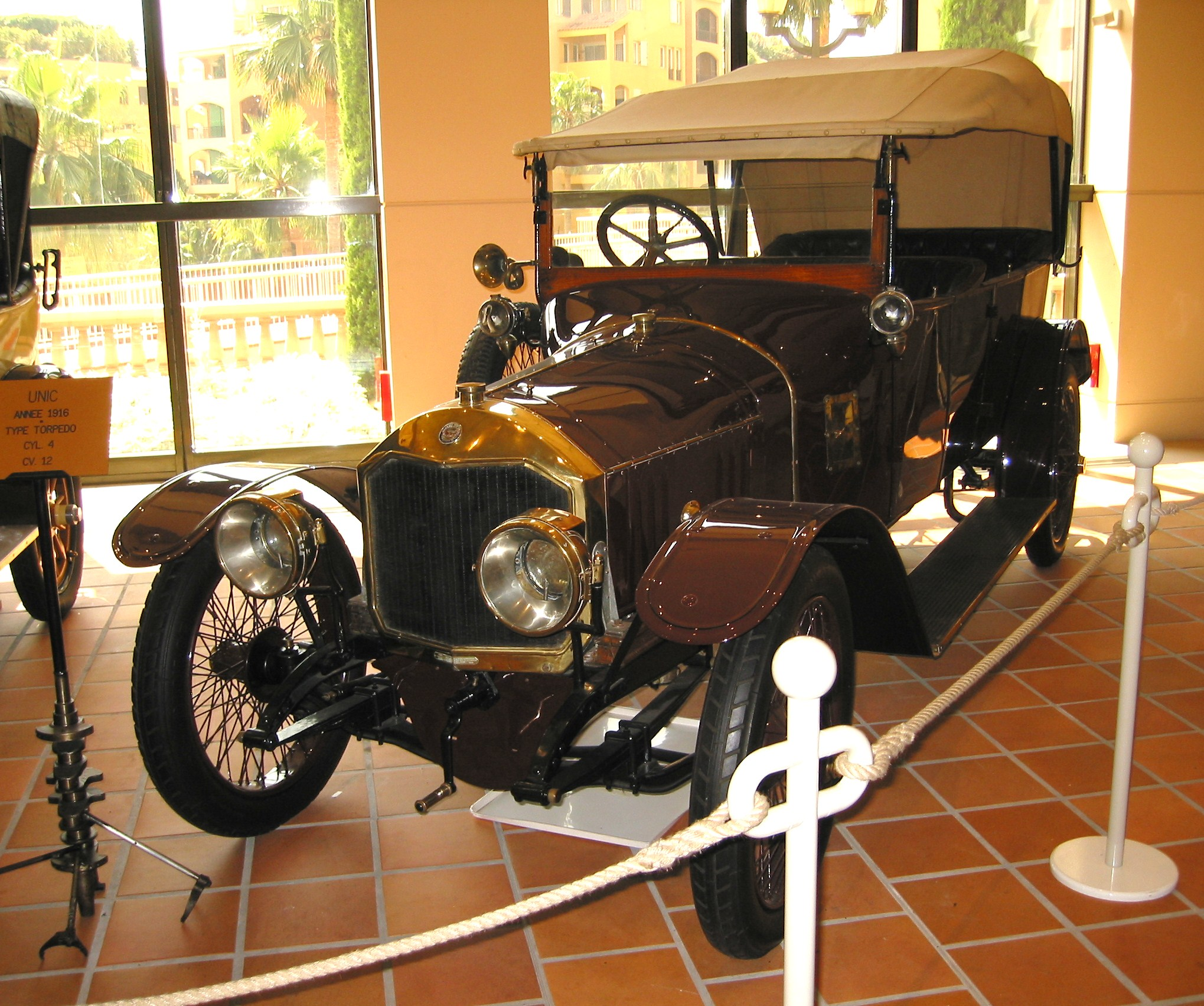
1916

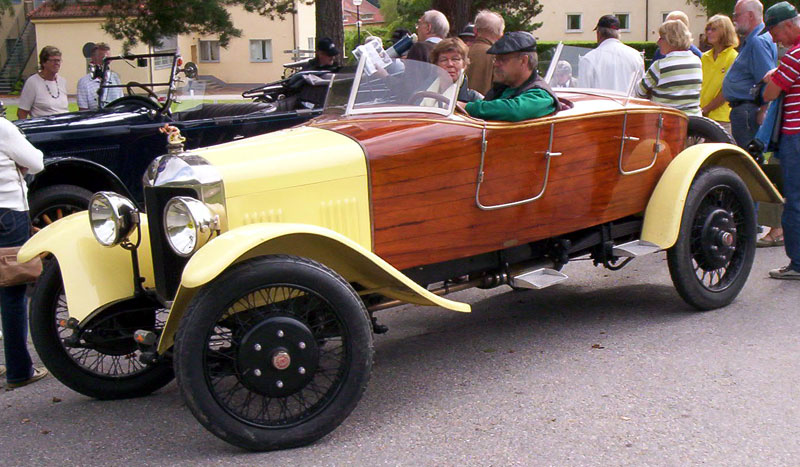
1924

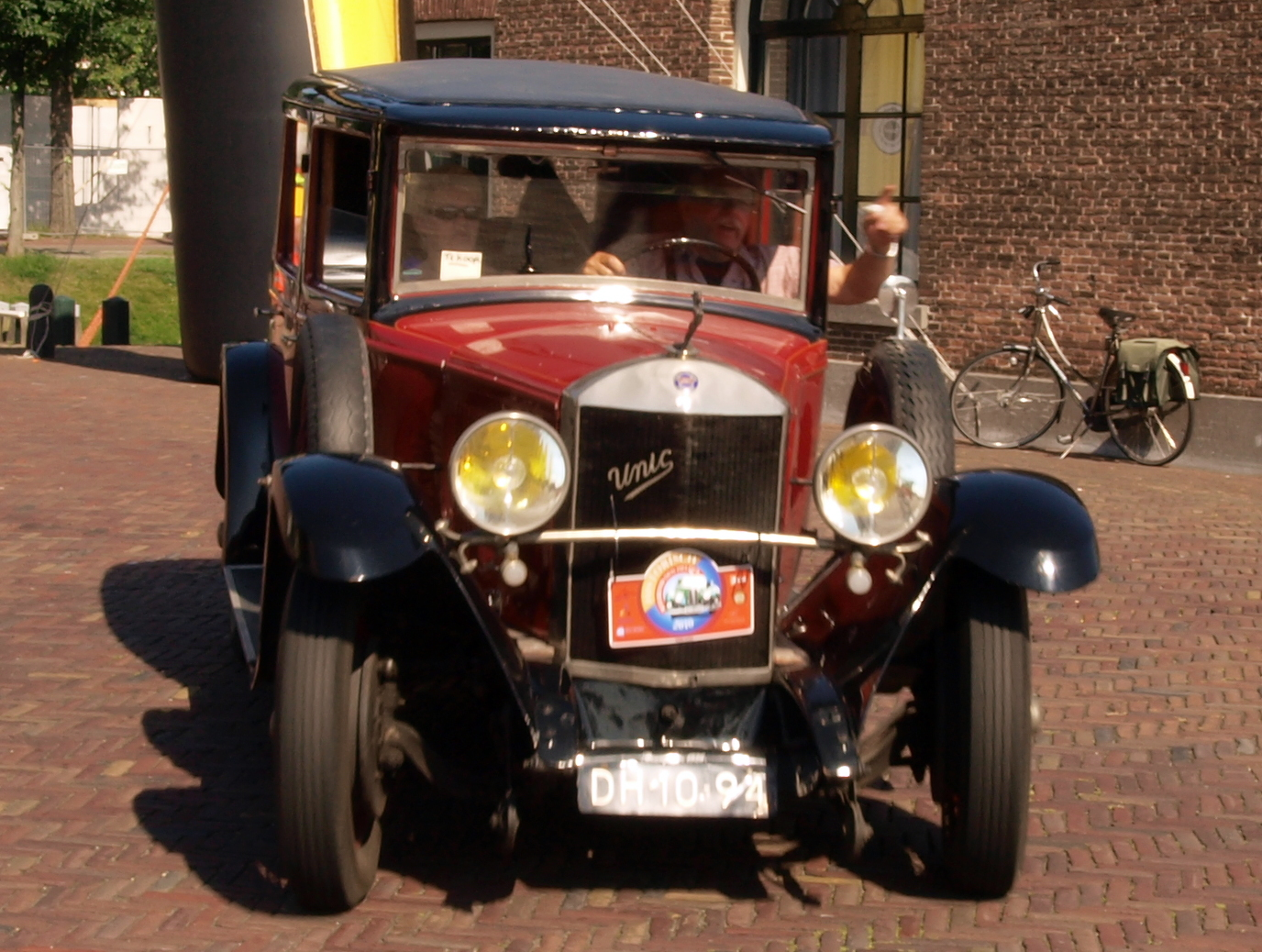
1926
Trucks

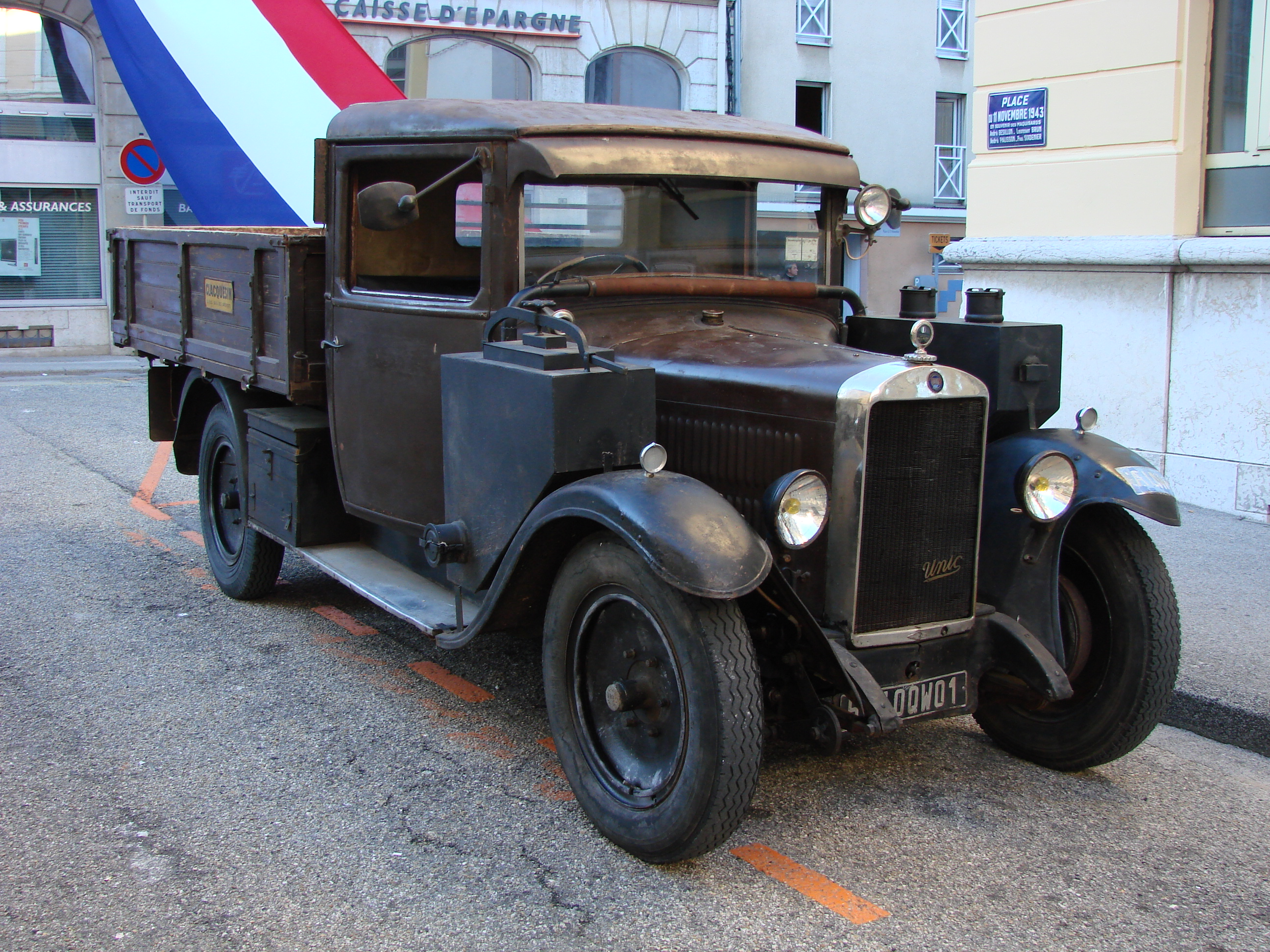

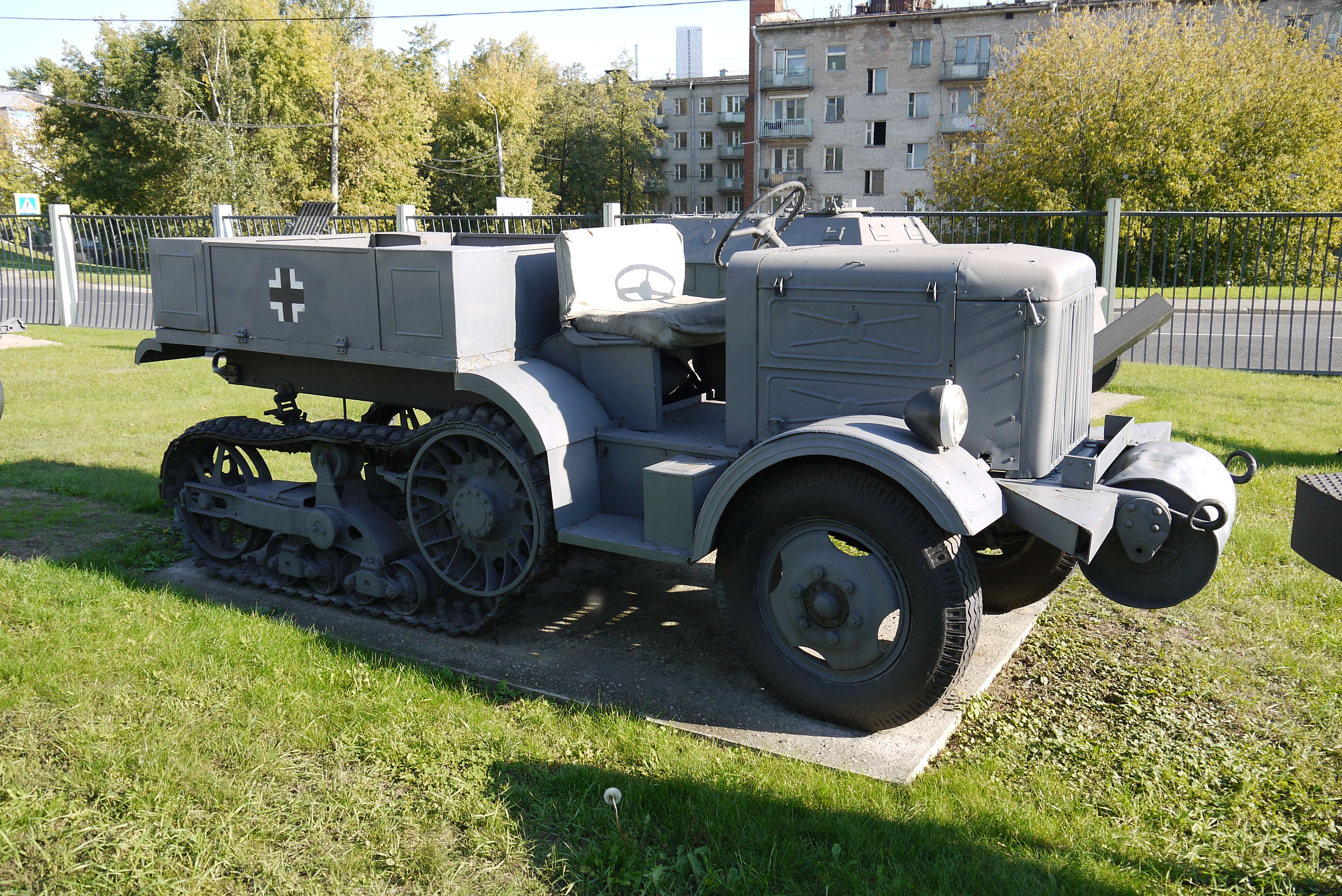
A Unic-Kegresse P107 halftrack that was captured and used by the Wehrmacht, displayed in the Museum of the Great Patriotic War, Moscow, Poklonnaya Hill Victory Park

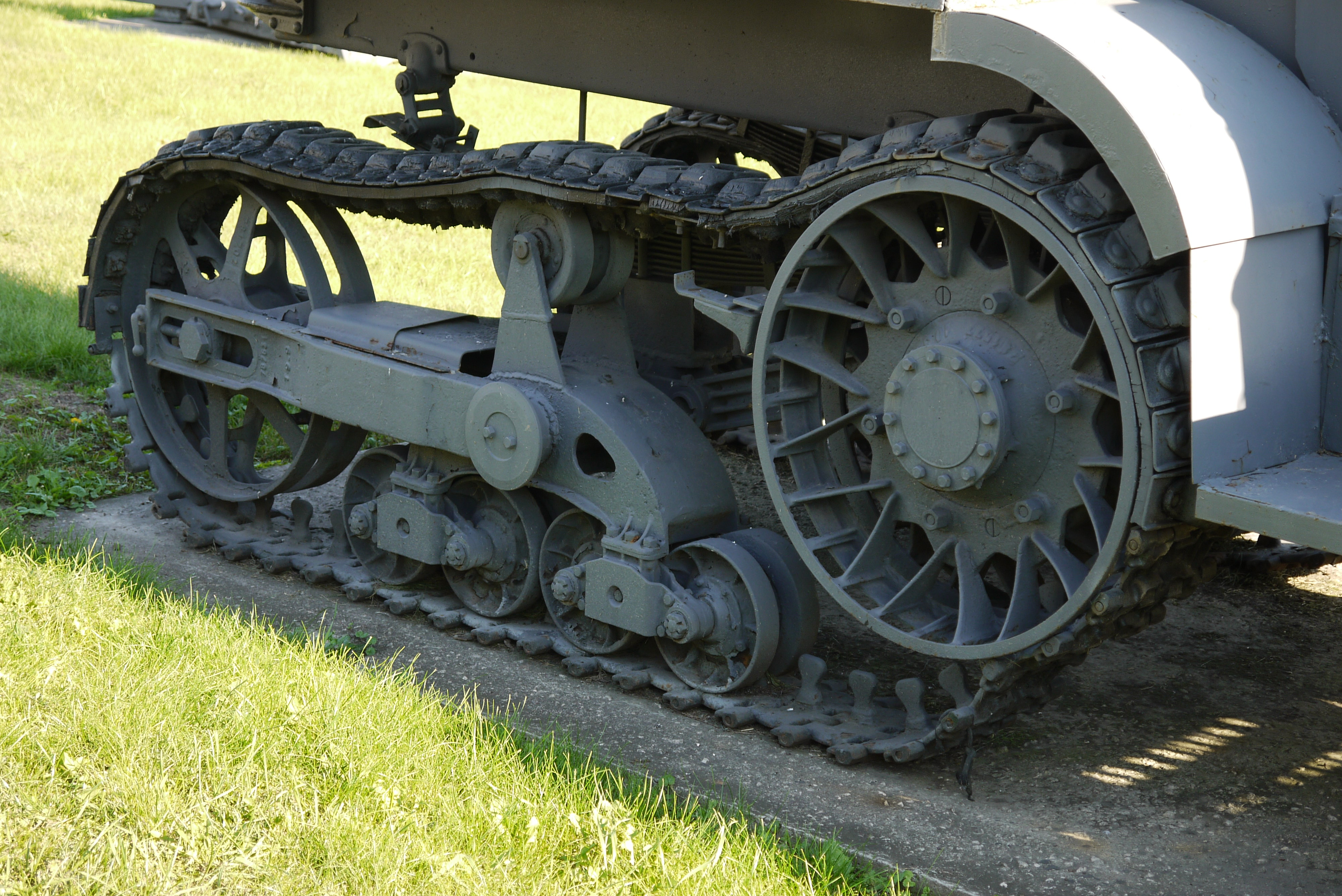
Tracks of a Unic-Kegresse P107 halftrack that was captured and used by the Wehrmacht, displayed in the Museum of the Great Patriotic War, Moscow, Poklonnaya Hill Victory Park

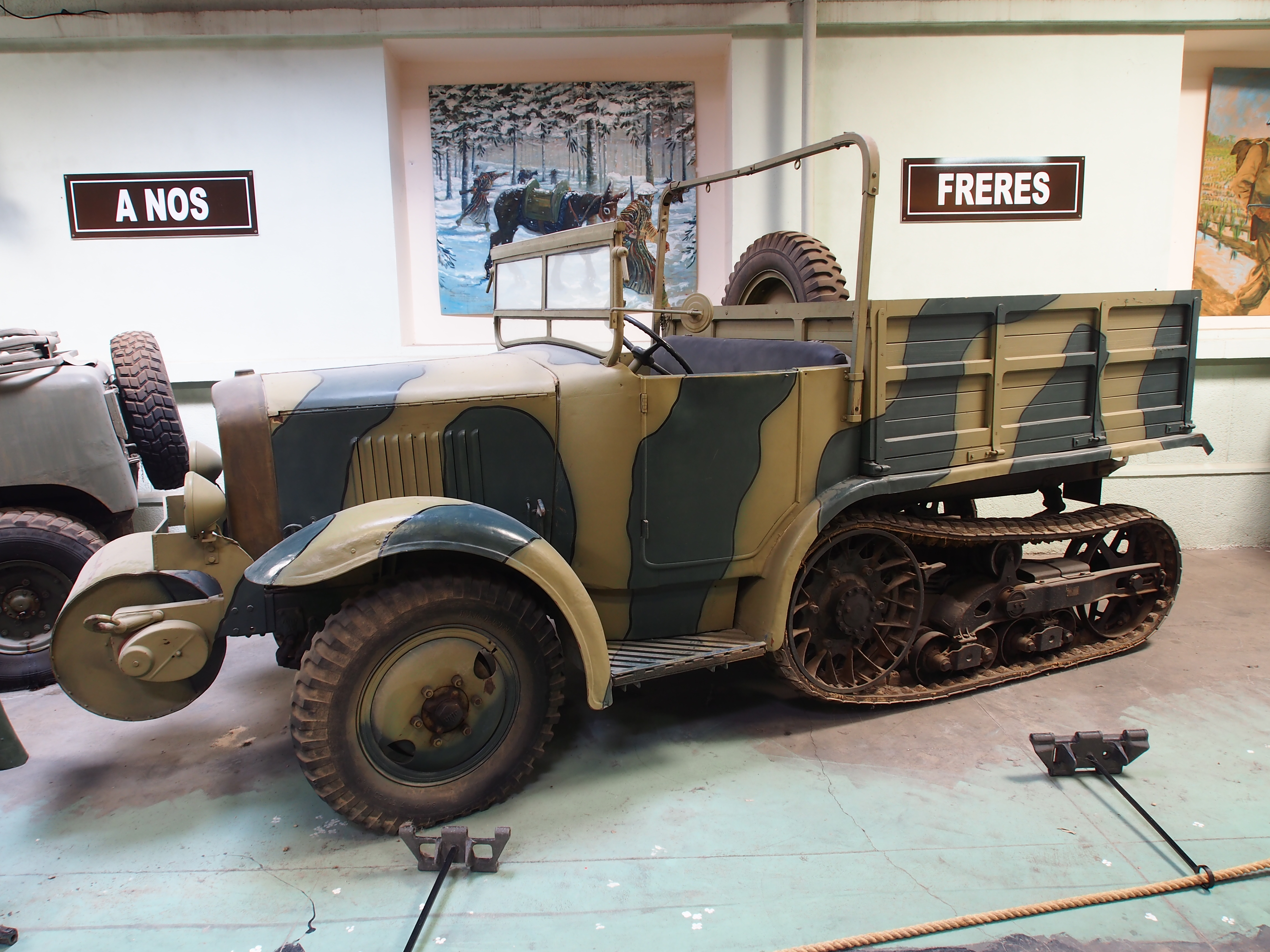
A Unic-Kegresse P107 at the Musée des Blindés, France.

== Post–World War II timeline ==
In 1952, the firm was taken over by Simca, headed by Henri Pigozzi, who wanted a commercial vehicle production unit. Trucks of this period are commonly referred to as Unic-Simca trucks. In 1956 the French arm of the Swiss truck manufacturer Saurer was taken over.

In 1966 Unic joined Fiat. In 1975 a holding company named Iveco was established covering truck and bus brands such as Fiat, OM, Lancia, UNIC and Magirus.

In 1976 Unic-Fiat S.A. became UNIC S.A. In 1992 Iveco Unic S.A. changed its name to Iveco France S.A.

In 2003, the company's headquarters moved from Villejuif to Boissy St Léger, where a second facility was established in 1995.
