= Georges Richard =

French racing driver and automobile industry pioneer

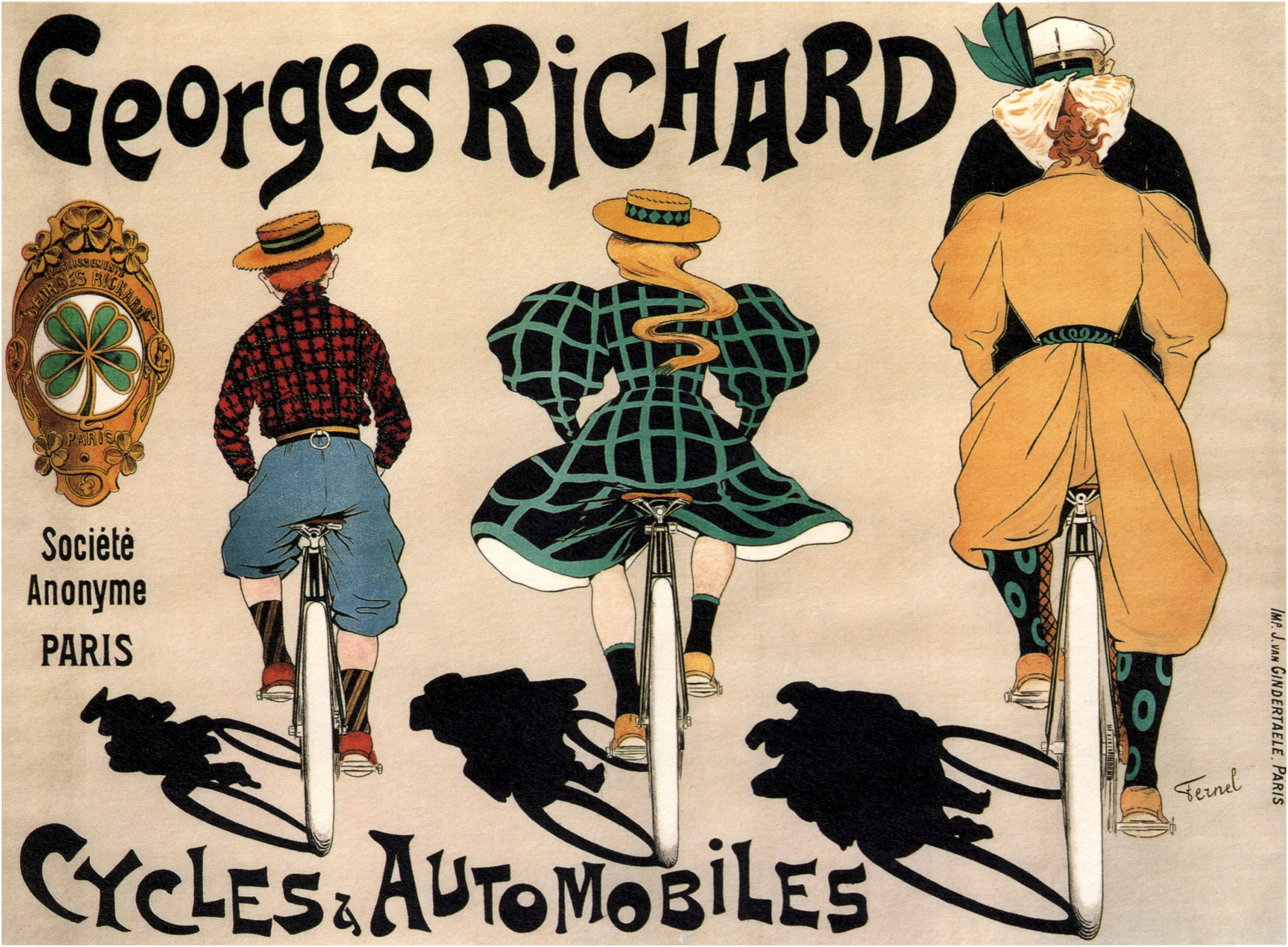
The Georges Richard automobile business originated with the cycling boom of the 1890s

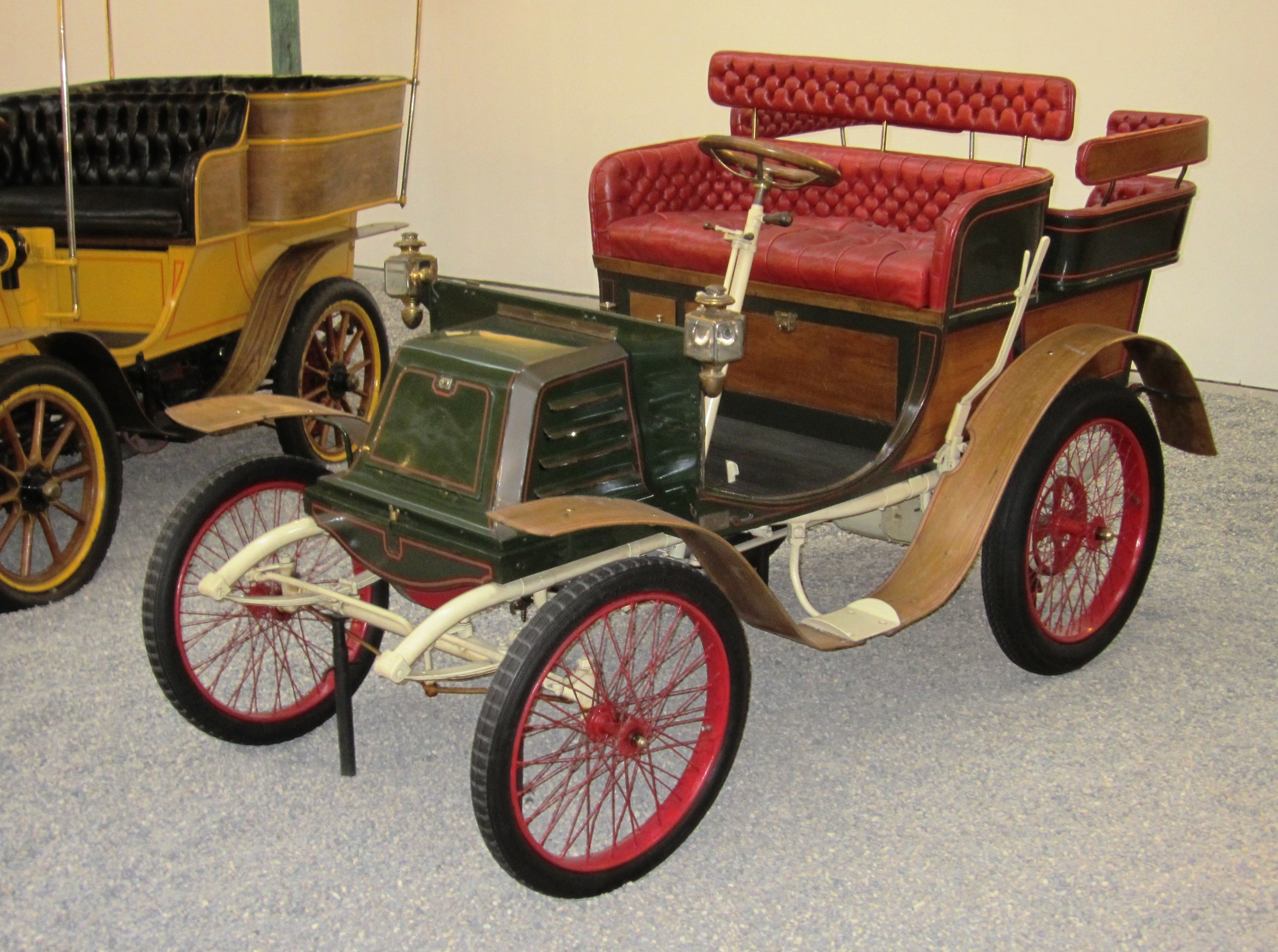
Georges Richard Tonneau Pony Type 1 (1900)

Georges Richard (1863–1922) was a French racing driver and automobile industry pioneer.

His first automobile manufacturing business, "Société des Anciens Établissements Georges Richard", was founded in the North-Paris suburb of "Ivry-Port" in 1897 by Georges Richard and his brother Maxime Richard. Originally copying Benz cars of the era, Richard bought a licence, in 1900, from the Belgian Vivinus to build voiturettes. By 1905, however, there had been a parting of the ways with Henri Brasier (who had become Richard's business partner in 1901). Georges Richard moved on to create in 1905 or 1906 a new automobile company called Société anonyme des automobiles Unic

== Origins ==
During the 1890s George Richard and his elder brother, Félix-Maxime worked in a bicycle repair and manufacturing business. The business flourished and the brothers created a company which they called "Société des Cycles Georges Richard". It is here, as far back as 1893, that we find the first reference to Richard producing and selling motor cars.

== From bicycles to cars ==
The brothers' belief in the quality of their bicycles enabled them to include a life-time guarantee against manufacturing defects when selling the machines. This enhanced the reputation of Georges-Richard bicycles and sales boomed. New customers included large-scale users of bicycles such as the health services and the military, along with the postal and telegraph services. Expansion led to a name change, and the business became the "Société de Construction de cycles et d'Automobiles Georges Richard". The first formally presented "motor car" was a two-seater propelled by a single cylinder 708cc power unit producing a claimed maximum output of 3.5 hp. This "voiturette" was presented at the first national bicycle show to admit motorised vehicles, and would be constructed between 1896 and 1902, being sold under the name "Pony".

== Henri Brasier moves in ==
The brothers took on another partner, Charles-Henri Brasier, in 1901. Brasier's influence within the business grew to the point where, in 1902 the name "Georges-Richard" disappeared from the auto-market. However, in 1903 cars continued to emerge from the little factory at 2 rue de Galilée in Ivry, now carrying the Richard-Brasier name.

== Business success and management rivalry ==
In 1904 and again in 1905, the prestigious Gordon Bennett Cup was won by Richard-Brasier cars, driven by Léon Théry. This did much to build a strong reputation for the cars. Relations deteriorated, however, between Brasier and Richard, Richard being repeatedly away from his desk due to his motor racing activities and, it was reported, injuries sustained as a result. In 1904 Brasier had himself appointed (sole or senior) executive director (dirigeant et administrateur), and gave notice to Richard terminating the agreement between them while purporting to retain both the factory at Ivry-Port and the "four-leaf clover" trade mark which Richard had recently registered for the business. There followed a bitter litigation between the partners whereby Brasier sought to prevent Richard from using the name "Richard" in connection with any future automobile manufacturing activity. In fact, Richard won the legal tussle, but he never would, in the future, use the trade name "Richard" in connection with automobile manufacture. After 1905 Georges Richard was no longer associated with the cars that till then had carried his name. Richard-Brasier automobiles, produced at the same factory as before, were from 1905 badged simply as Brasiers, and retained that name as the business faded from prominence, until the now renamed "Société des Automobiles Brasier" folded in 1930.

Georges Richard himself nevertheless continued to play a leading role in the French auto industry, establishing in 1905 the Unic automobile business which half a century later, having switched its focus from passenger cars to commercial vehicles, had evolved into a leading French truck manufacturer.

== Société anonyme des automobiles Unic ==
In 1905, following a meeting with the polymath entrepreneur Baron Henri de Rothschild, Georges Richard obtained sufficient funding to establish the Société anonyme des automobiles UNIC, and to construct a first factory for the new enterprise in the north-Paris suburb of Puteaux, in order to manufacture "unique" motor vehicles tailored to various sets of customer requirements. Initially the company manufactured only light passenger cars and taxis.

In 1922, paving the way for a future in which the company would be known as a truck manufacturer, Unic introduced a 3-ton truck, the Unic M5C. This was also the year in which Georges Richard died, on 22 June, following a motor accident, while on the way to Rouen. For the Unic business, however, the best years still lay ahead.

== Gallery ==
Company logo

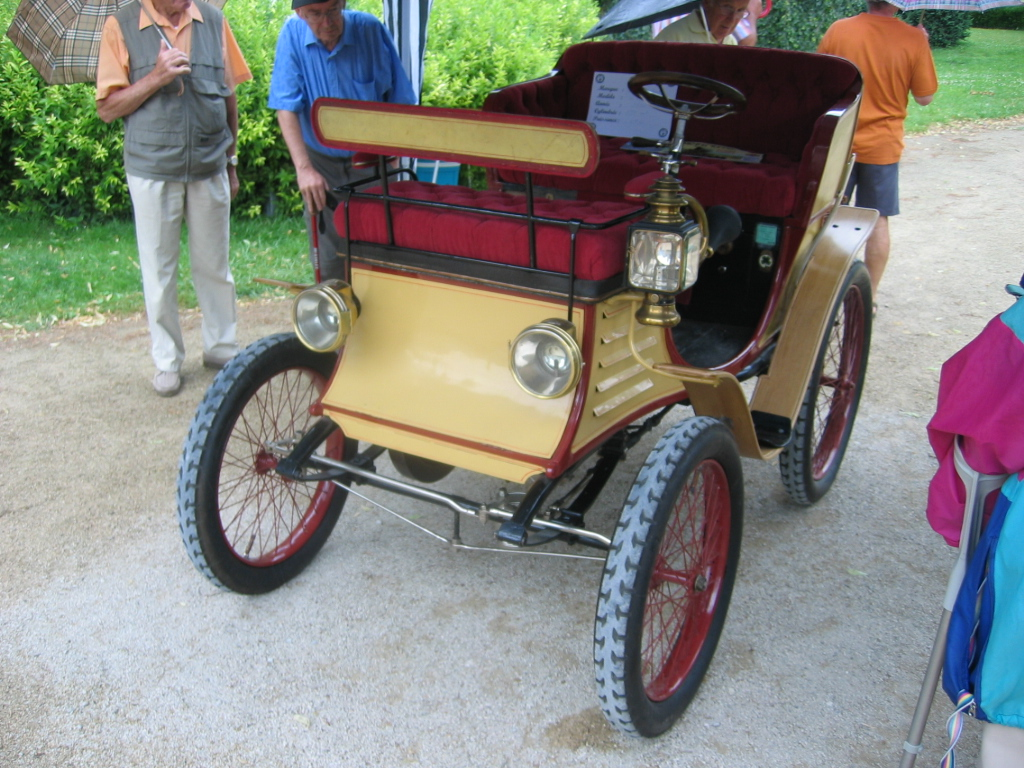
Georges Richard 1901 – 850cc

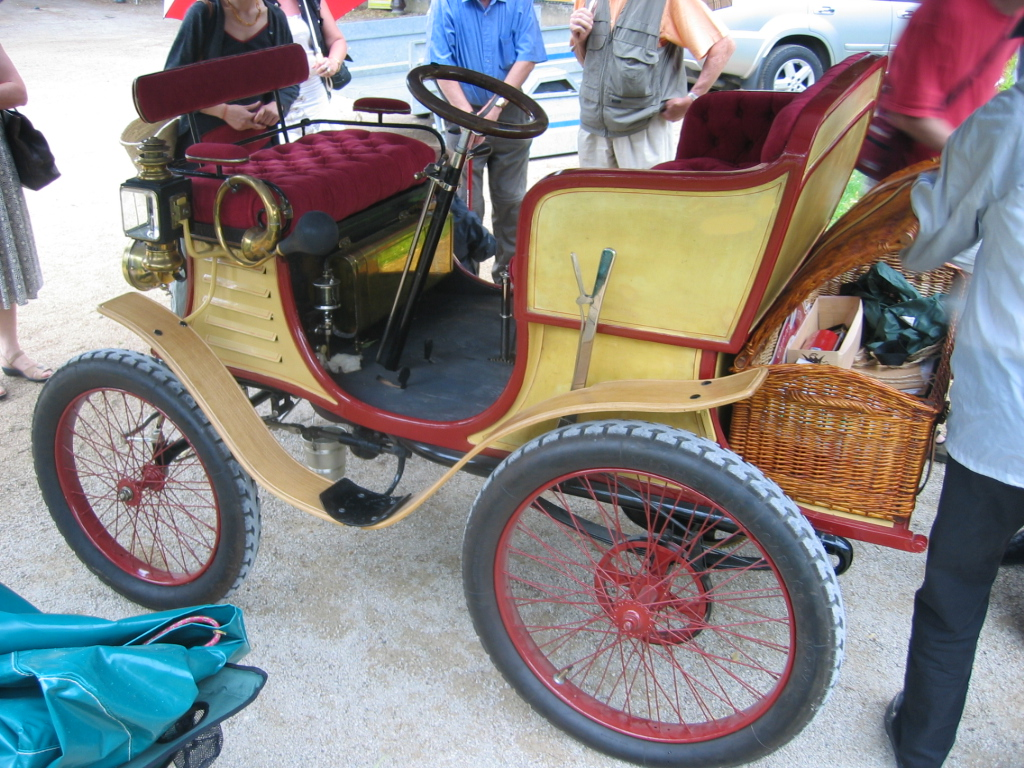

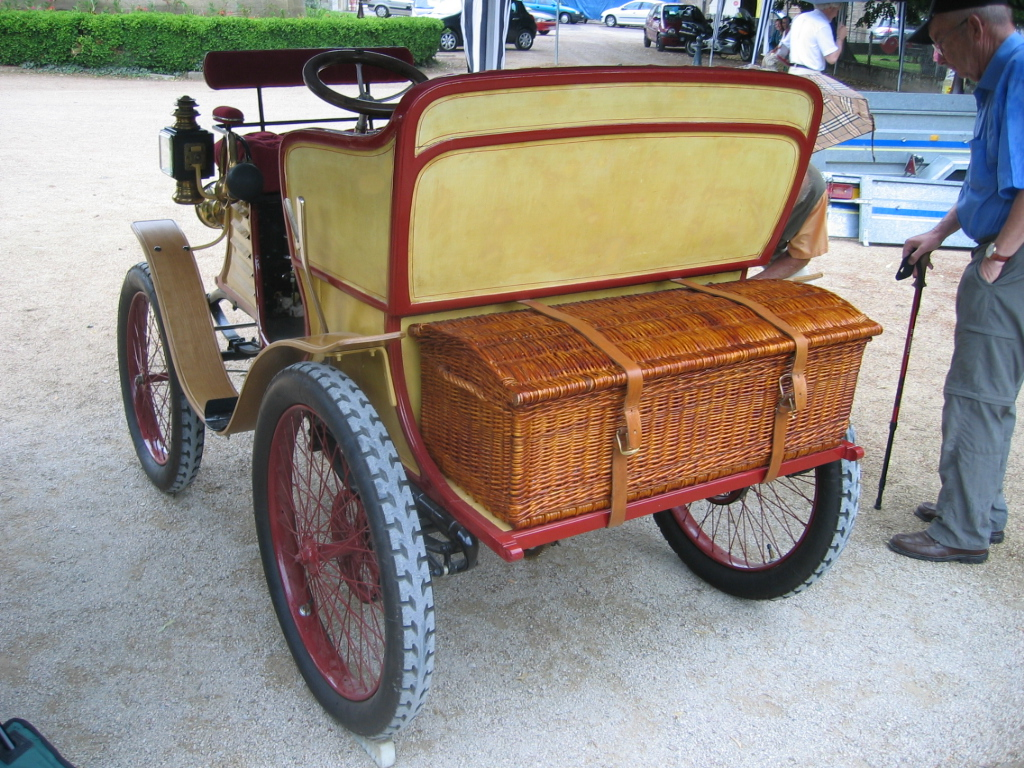

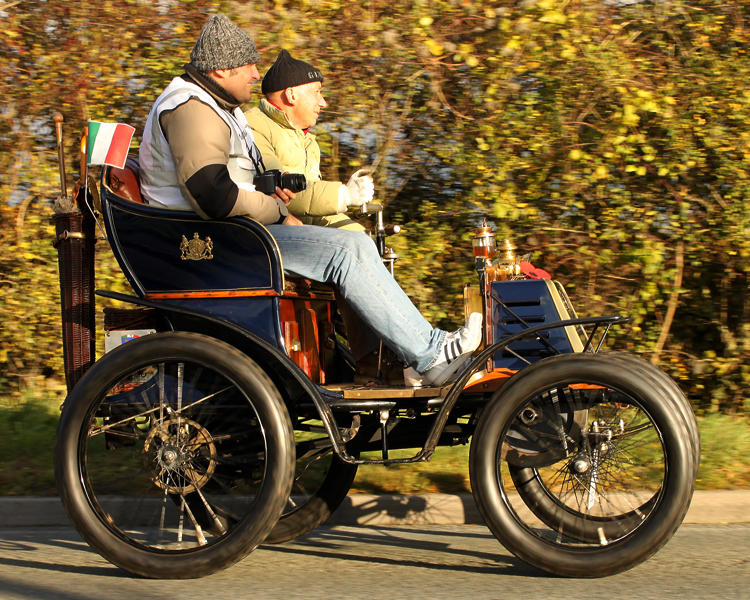
1900 Georges Richard 3 1/2HP Two-seater

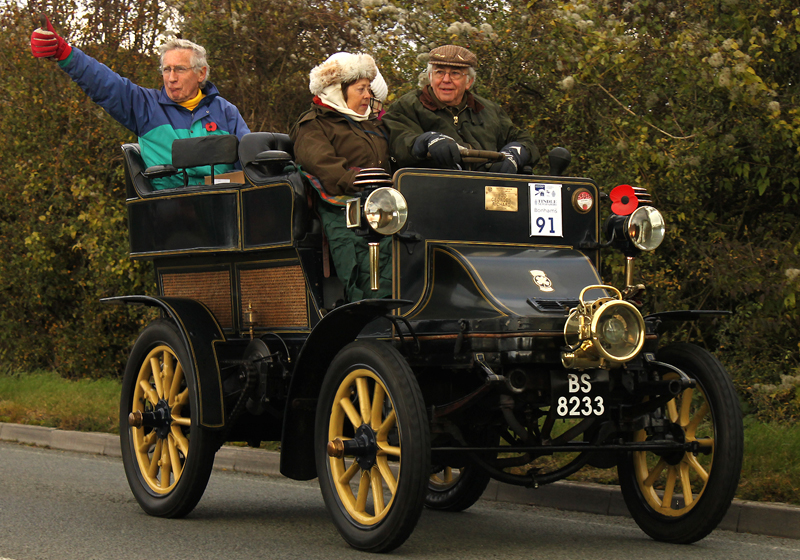
1900 Georges Richard 7HP Rear-entrance tonneau

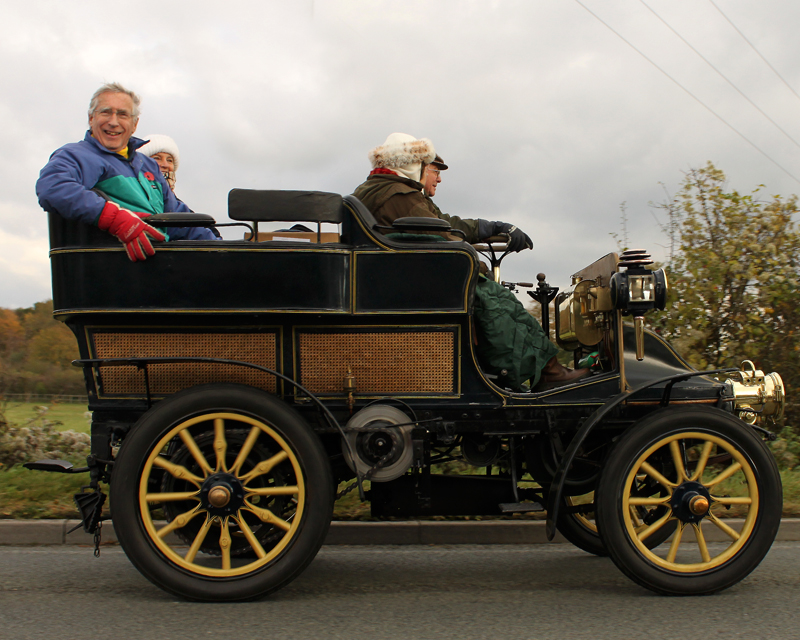
1900 Georges Richard 7HP Rear-entrance tonneau

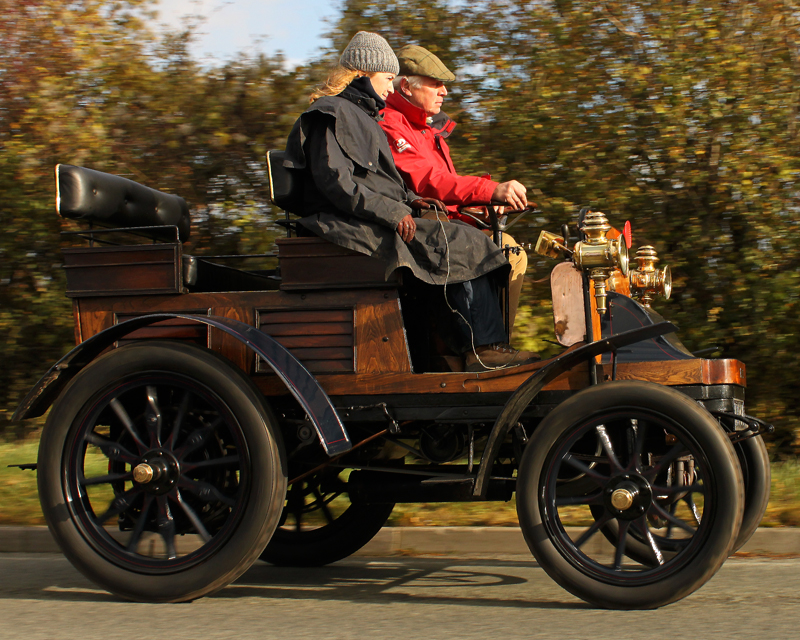
1900 Georges Richard 9HP Dogcart

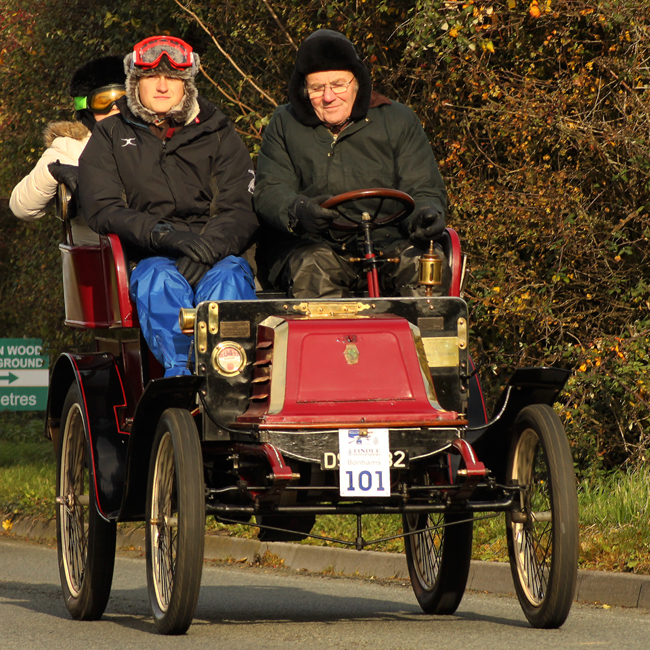
1901 Georges Richard 3 1/2HP Tonneau

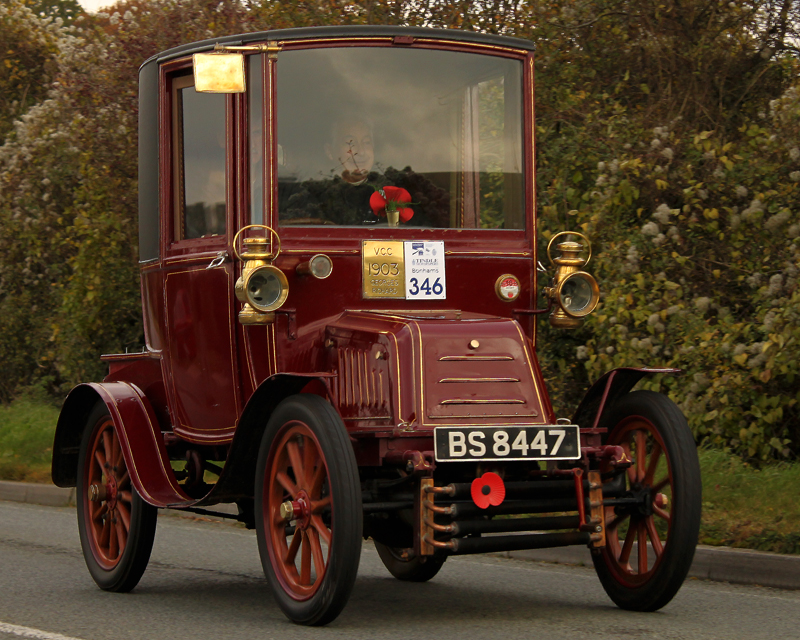
1903 Georges Richard 10HP Brougham

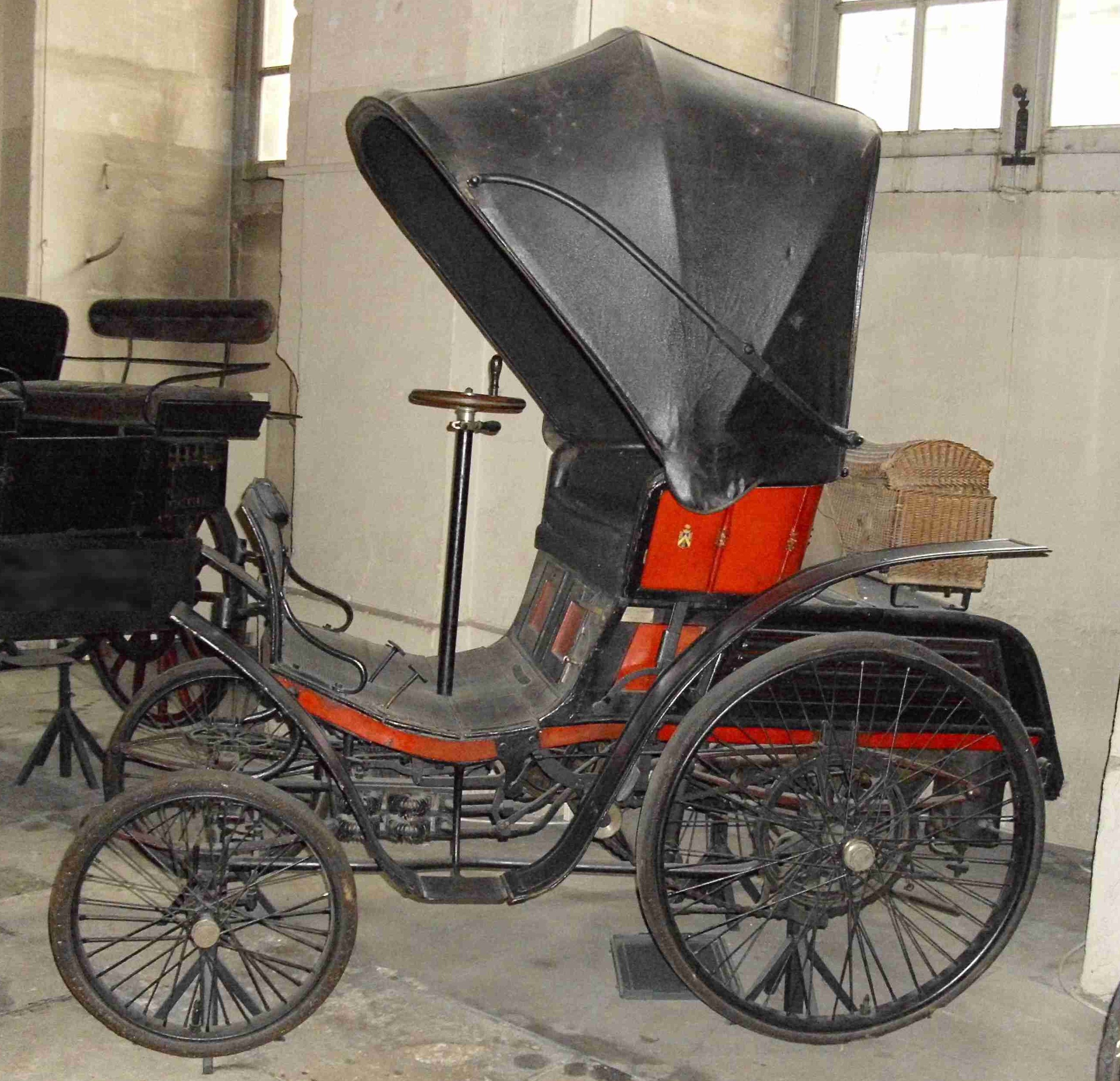
At the National Car and Tourism Museum in France
