= Joseph Brazier =

- Company type: Private
- Industry: firearms
- Founded: Circa 1700
- Defunct: 13 January 2015
- Headquarters: Arundel, U.K
- Area served: Worldwide
- Products: firearms, manufacturer of locking mechanisms
- Owner: Karl C. Lippard
- Website: www.josephbrazier.com

Joseph Brazier was originally a gun-locksmith firm, based in Wolverhampton, England, having begun as a family business around 1700 in London. The firm was very active in the 19th century, and was well known as a manufacturer of precision locks for rifles – including some used in the American Civil War – and the American Hawken plains rifle.

Today Joseph Brazier manufactures precision interchangeable parts, components, and one solid piece over/under shotgun barrels as well as side by side and double rifle barrels. The company maintains offices in Arundel, UK and Colorado Springs, Colorado, USA. Karl C. Lippard is the current Managing Director.
