= Alan Brazier =

English cricketer

Personal information
- Full name: Alan Frederick Brazier
- Born: 7 December 1924; Paddington, London
- Died: 18 April 1999 (aged 74); Droxford, Hampshire
- Batting: Right-handed
- Bowling: Right-arm medium

Domestic team information
- Years: Team
- 1948–1954: Surrey
- 1955–1956: Kent

Career statistics
Competition	First-class
Matches	58
Runs scored	1,366
Batting average	17.07
100s/50s	0/6
Top score	92
Balls bowled	346
Wickets	4
Bowling average	39.50
5 wickets in innings	0
10 wickets in match	0
Best bowling	2/45
Catches/stumpings	20/–
- Source: CricInfo, 5 April 2017

Alan Frederick Brazier (7 December 1924 – 18 April 1999) was an English cricketer who played first-class cricket for Surrey County Cricket Club and Kent County Cricket Club between 1948 and 1956.

Brazier was born at Paddington in London. He went to Southall Technical School in the London Borough of Ealing and played club cricket for Ealing Dean Cricket Club. He served in the Royal Air Force during World War II

Brazier was a right-handed batsman and occasional right-arm medium-pace bowler. He was extremely successful for Surrey's second eleven in the Minor Counties Championship, scoring 1,212 runs in 1949 to establish a new record for the competition. He was unable to break into the very strong Surrey side of the time on a consistent basis, and made only 36 appearances for the county between 1948 and 1954. He moved to Kent for the 1955 season and played 20 times over the next two seasons before retiring at the end of the 1956 season.

During his career Brazier had coached the young Henry Blofeld at Blofeld's Norfolk home. After his retirement from first-class cricket, Brazier was the professional coach at St George's College, Weybridge. He died at Droxford in Hampshire in 1999 aged 74.
