= Donald H. Brazier Jr. =

American politician

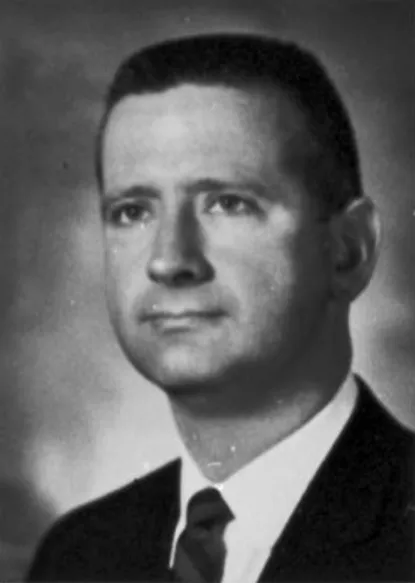
- Brazier in 1967

Member of the Washington House of Representatives from the 14th district
- In office 1967–1969

Personal details
- Born: March 14, 1931 (age 95) Seattle, Washington, U.S.
- Party: Republican
- Education: Whitman College; University of Washington

Donald H. Brazier Jr. (born March 14, 1931) is an American politician. He served as a Republican member for the 14th district of the Washington House of Representatives.

== Life and career ==
Brazier was born in Seattle, Washington. He attended Whitman College and the University of Washington.

Brazier served in the Washington House of Representatives from 1967 to 1969.
