= Robert H. B. Brazier =

Robert H. B. Brazier (died 1837) was an English surveyor who emigrated to the United States in July 1819.

Brazier emigrated as an assistant to Hamilton Fulton who had been hired as Principal Engineer by the North Carolina Board of Internal Improvements. Brazier had received his professional training under John Rennie, the Scottish Civil Engineer who is remembered as the designer of several bridges, including London Bridge, the Plymouth Breakwater and the London and East India docks. Brazier’s contract with the State was not confirmed until February 1820, although he had been engaged with his duties under Fulton since their arrival.

There were those in the Legislature were opposed to any program of tax supported internal improvements. These were mostly Easterners, who attempted to manipulate the program to obtain major benefits to the Eastern region. These efforts were opposed by those from the Central and Western parts of the State. With this political infighting the continued existence of the Board of Internal Improvements itself was in doubt. Brazier applied to the State of Virginia for the post of Principal Engineer to the State of Virginia, which post had recently become vacant. He was endorsed for the position by Governor Gabriel Holmes, William Nichols, Architect, and William Ruffin, but was unsuccessful and continued at his post in North Carolina.

From 1820 through 1823, Brazier completed surveys and drew maps, plans, profiles and sections of the principal water courses in the State from the Yadkin to Roanoke Inlet. Late in 1823, he became involved with a dispute with the Board of Internal Improvements regarding his account of expenses. Brazier resigned, effective February 19, 1823 and wrote the Board what they characterized as a “disrespectful” letter, demanding settlement of his account. The requested settlement not forthcoming, Brazier entered suit against the State. The Wake County Superior Court found for Brazier and he was awarded damages in 1825.

For several years, Brazier worked privately, making a handsome map of Fayetteville, making patent drawings and surveying. Among his surveys during that time was the Buncombe Turnpike from Greenville, South Carolina to Greeneville, Tennessee which was actually funded and completed by the State in 1827.

In early 1827, Brazier entered into a contractual relationship with the Board of Internal Improvement to survey swamp lands in Eastern North Carolina. His report was presented to the General Assembly in the late fall of 1827 and his expenses to the Board in early 1828, after which, his connection with the Board came to an end.

Again, Brazier worked privately. Among his work during this period was the surveying a route from Raleigh to Cobb’s Mill (now Wiggin’s Mill on Contentnea Creek at US 117 in Wilson Co.?) and laying out the Town of Rolesville.

In 1826, John McRae of Fayetteville convinced the General Assembly to fund a new map of the State. McRae first attempted to secure the services of one W. H. Hanford of the Corps of Engineers, but this did not avail, and McRae turned to Brazier. By July, 1831, he had completed most of his surveys and the drawing was ready for the engraver in 1832.

In 1831, the post of Principal Engineer in Virginia again became vacant. Brazier again applied for the position and was endorsed by the Governor, Montfort Stokes, Senator James Iredell, Jr., state Attorney General Romulus M. Saunders and others, attesting to his skill as a surveyor and expressing the opinion that “as a Draughtsman, it is believed that (Brazier) has no superior in the Country.” This application again failed of success, but he was employed for various surveys in southeastern Virginia.

After his arrival in Raleigh, Brazier built a residence in a newly subdivided area just east of the originally laid out city. This house survives today with what is said by the present owner to be the original roof. It is in the south east quadrant of the intersection of Jones and East Streets, presently owned and occupied by W. E. Hutchins.

Brazier’s fortunes declined during the late 1820s. The mortgage on his residence was foreclosed in May 1830, and both real and personal property were lost. By 1833, it became necessary for the Christ Church (Episcopal) charitable fund to come to the aid of his family. His wife, Rachel and his son, James Henderson were Episcopalians. Brazier was, presumably, Anglican. In an effort to recoup his fortunes, in 1834, Brazier, with eleven associates, developed lots in Fayetteville. The venture was not as successful as hoped, and by 1836, Christ Church once again had to come to his aid.

Following an ice storm during the Christmas season in 1836, Brazier fell from some steps and died some two weeks later as a result of injuries. The Rector of Christ Church wrote that Brazier had come to his death “by his own folly and wickedness,” though he acknowledged that he was a most excellent draughtsman, “with the talents of an angel”. Presumably, Brazier was buried in the old City Cemetery.

Many maps and surveys by Brazier survive, among which are:

- “Plan of the Neuse River from Stone’s Mill to Major Turner’s Ferry showing the proposed situation of the Locks and Dams...” 1819
- “Plan of Croatan and Roanoke Sounds Shewing the Proposed Situations of the Embankment and Inlet”. 1820
- “Plan and Sections of a Line of Canal from the Tar River to Tossnot (sic) Creek...” 1820
- “Plan of the Tar River from Louisburg to the Little Falls, Showing the Proposed Situation of the Locks and Dams” 1821
- “Longitudinal Section of the Catawba River from the Devil’s Shoals to the Mouth of the Little Catawba River” 1824
- “Plan of the Catawba River from the Devil’s Shoal to near Sherrill’s Ford” 1824

There are more maps and surveys in the Map Collection of the State Archives.
