= Brasier =

1905–1926 French automotive brand manufacturer

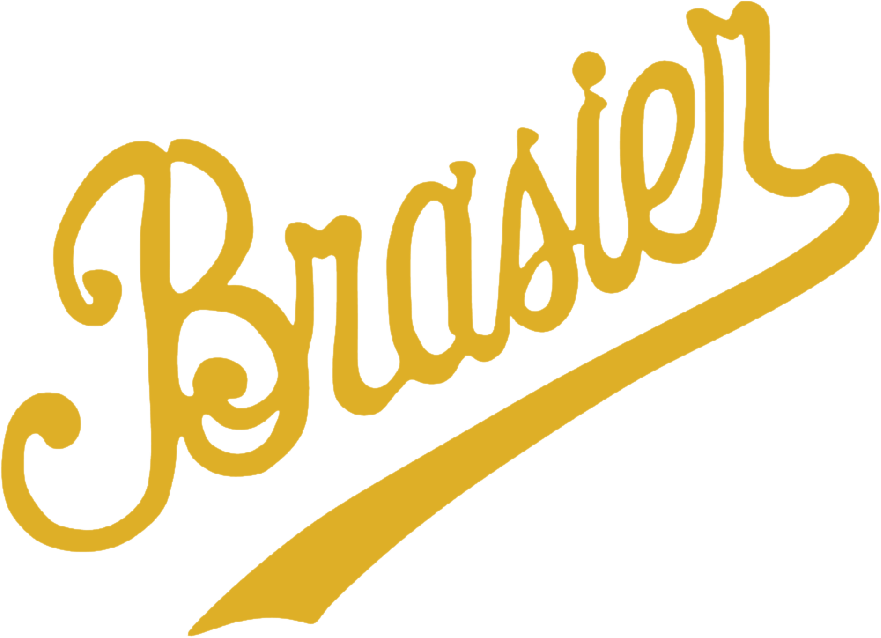
- Founded: 1905 as Société des Automobiles Brasier
- Defunct: 1931
- Fate: Bankruptcy
- Headquarters: Ivry, France (factory)
- Key people: Charles-Henri Brasier
- Products: Automobiles

Brasier was a French automobile manufacturer, based in the Paris conurbation, and active between 1905 and 1930. The firm began as Richard-Brasier in 1902, and became known as Chaigneau-Brasier in 1926.

== Origins ==
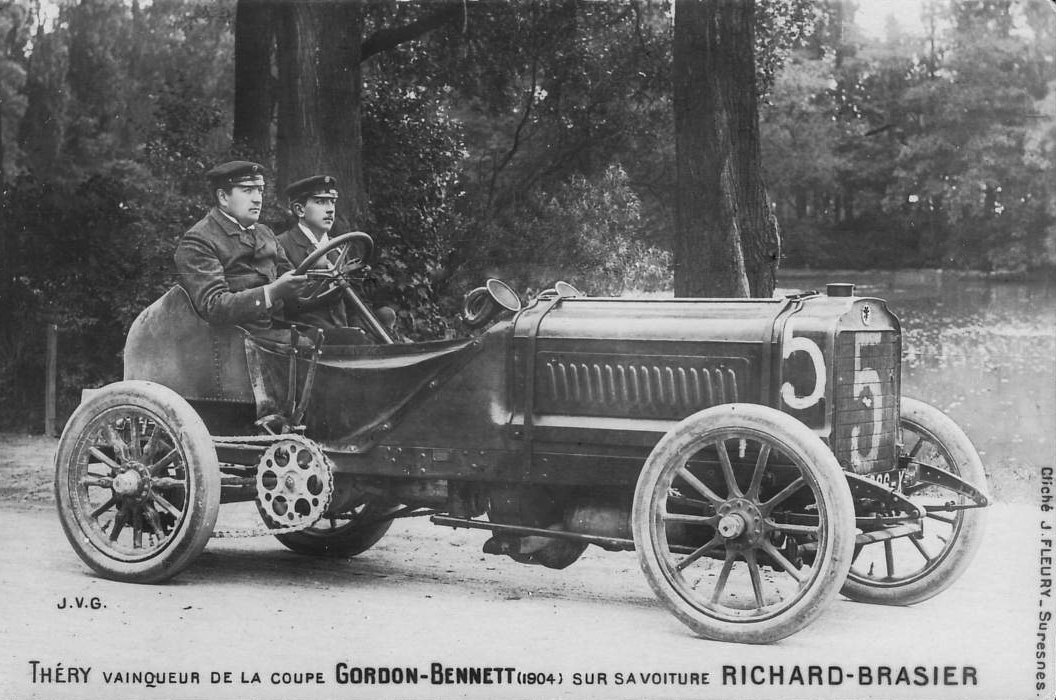
Leon Thery, winner of the 1904 Gordon Bennett competition, driving a Richard-Brasier

Charles-Henri Brasier worked briefly with Panhard and then for some years with Émile Mors before, at the age of 35, he set himself up as an automobile manufacturer on his own account. He did this in partnership with Georges Richard, the two of them establishing the Richard-Brasier business in 1902.

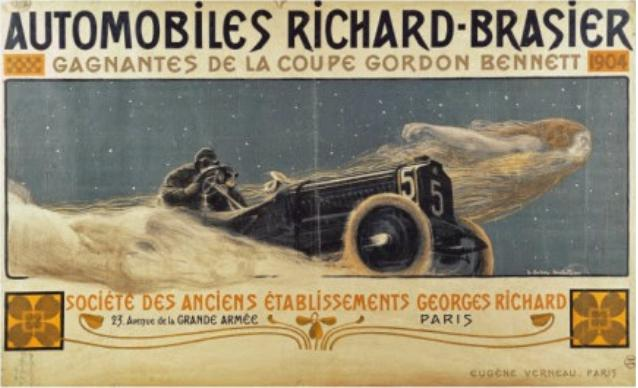
Poster for Richard-Brasier automobiles by Henri Bellery-Desfontaines, 1905

By 1905, relations had broken down between the partners due to Richard being frequently away from his desk due to his motor racing activities and, it was reported, injuries he sustained as a result. The strained relations prompted Richard to leave the company that year to found Unic. The newly renamed Brasier firm was therefore born into an atmosphere of recrimination and litigation. Nevertheless, Brasier retained the premises originally acquired by the Richard-Brasier company in Ivry, just outside the ring formed by the old city walls (today followed by the "Périphérique" motor-way) on the southern edge of central Paris.

== Early Brasiers ==
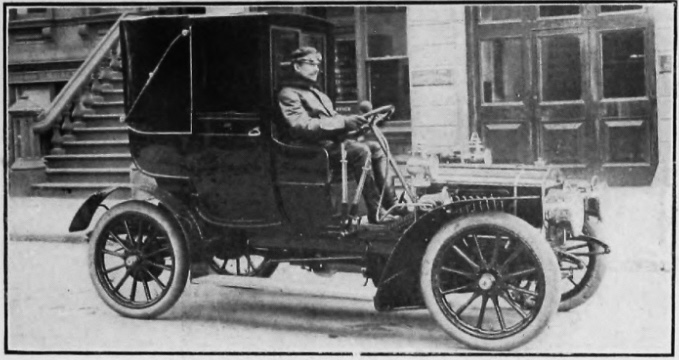
Richard-Brasier Landaulette 16-20 hp (1905)

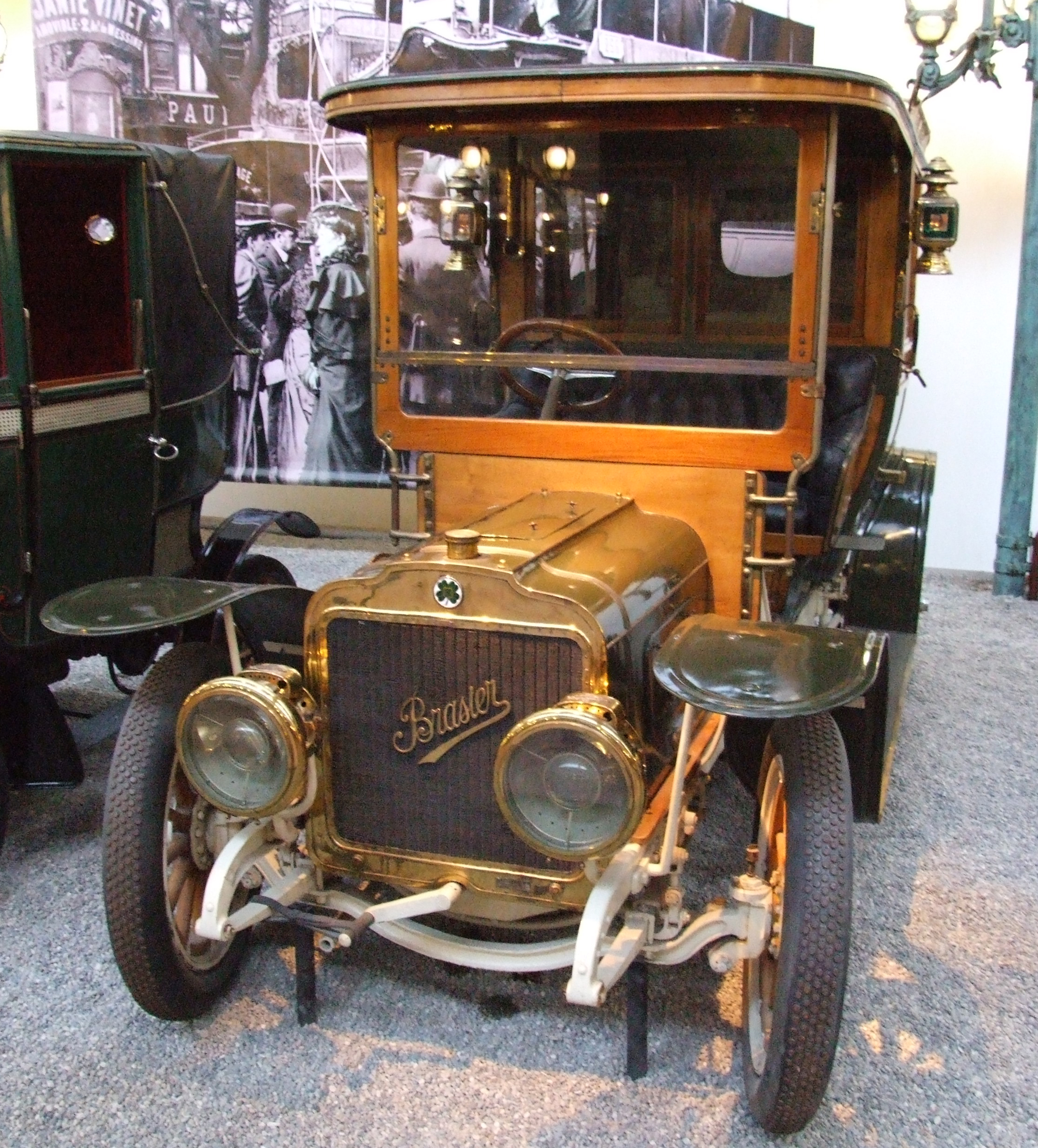
Brasier Coupe Chauffeur KD, 1908, 4 cylinder, 24 HP, 3397 cc, Cité de l’Automobile – Musée National – Collection Schlumpf, Mulhouse, France

Before World War I, several twin, four and six-cylinder models were offered. During this period the company was selling around 1,000 cars annually.

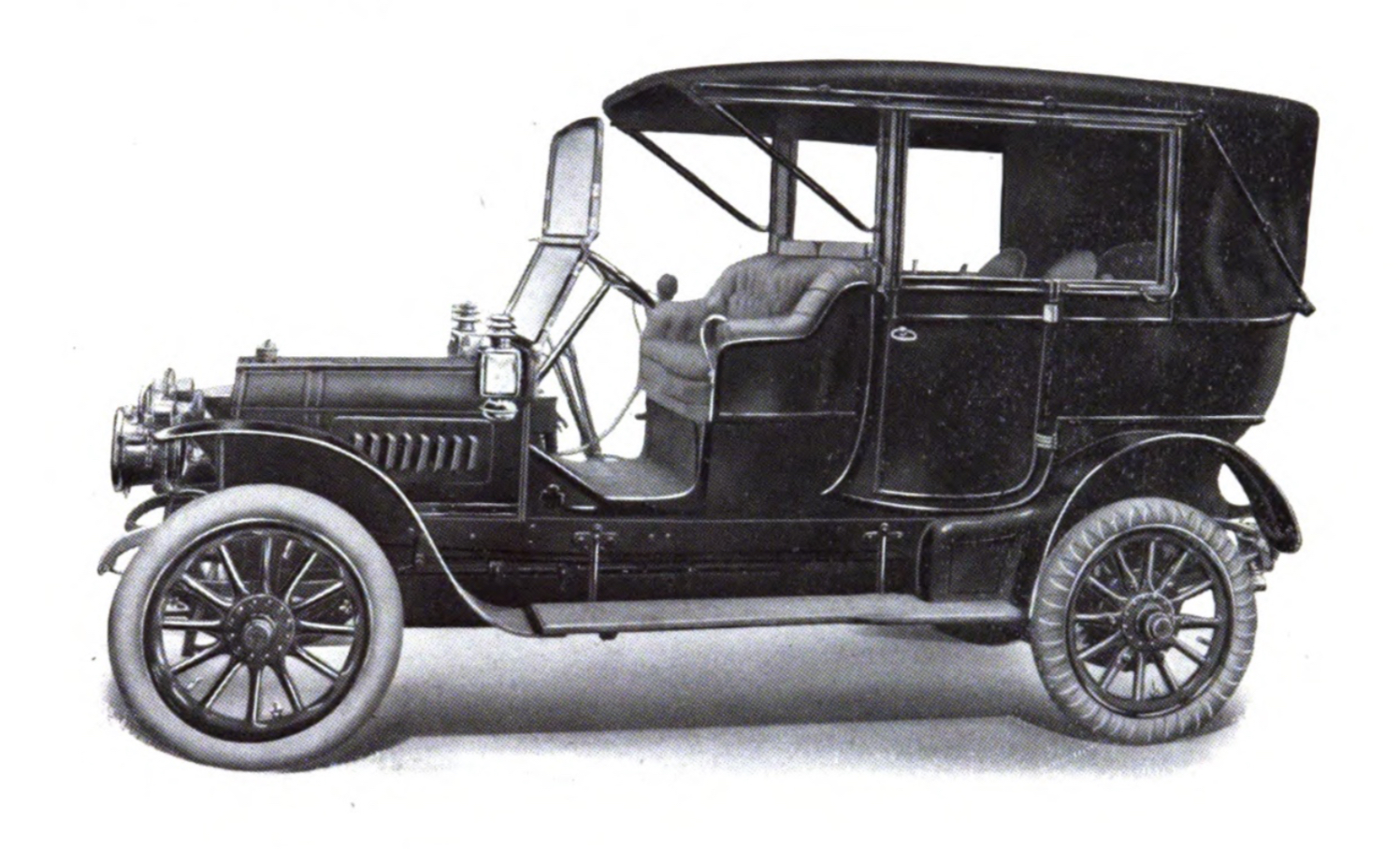
Brasier 35/50 CV (1911–1912)

== World War I ==
Brasier was one of several companies to be contracted to produce the innovative Hispano-Suiza V8 aero engine for use in such scouts as the SPAD S.VII, S.E.5a and Sopwith Dolphin. However, Brasier engines were of such poor quality that the RFC's Quartermaster General, Brig.-Gen. Robert Brooke-Popham had to write: "When 1,170 [rpm] SE.5s are allotted, please issue any other 1,170 SE.5 in preference to a Brasier. Brasier engines will only be issued to squadrons when no other 1,170 is available."

== After WWI ==
Following the outbreak of peace, production was resumed in 1919 with a 3404 cc model.

By 1920 Brasier were displaying two models in their high-profile show room, not far from the Place de la Concorde at the prestigious eastern end of the Champs-Élysées The smaller of these was a 4-cylinder 3,392 cc (18 CV/HP) engined car with a choice between two wheelbase lengths of either 3,300 mm (129.9 in) or 3,420 mm (134.6 in). The larger car was fitted with a 6-cylinder 5,325 cc (30 CV/HP) and sat on an impressive 3,650 mm (143.7 in) chassis. The cars were priced by the manufacturer respectively at 22,500 francs and 40,000 francs in bare chassis form, with tires included.

In October 1924 the Brasier stand at the 19th Paris Motor Show was, as in earlier years, prominently positioned in the central part of the display area, but by now Henri Brasier had switched away from the very large cars he had produced in the immediate post-war years, and was offering the "Brasier Type TB4", launched in 1923 and powered by a 4-cylinder 2,062 cc (12 CV/HP) engine, set on a wheelbase of only 3,100 mm (122.0 in). The currency had continued to lose value following the end of the war and this model was listed at 40,000 francs for a "Torpedo" bodied car and 45,000 francs for a "Conduite interieure" (two-box sedan/saloon/berline) version. By this time, however, the company's market-place presence was being progressively eaten into by other, more focused and forward thinking auto-makers.

The cars made after 1926 are known under the name of Chaigneau-Brasier, after the company was bought by the Chaigneau family who had been bicycle makers. The first car made by the new company was the TD-4, a 9 CV 4-cylinder model available as a tourer or saloon. The company appears to have sought a return to its "luxury car" strategy of ten years earlier, now combined with elements of technical innovation for which its traditional customers had not been prepared, introducing a 3-litre OHC-engined front-wheel drive car, described by one commentator as "Utopian", in 1928 An even larger model followed in 1930. In view of the severe economic downturn crystallised by the Wall Street crash of October 1929, the timing of this venture was unfortunate. The new large Chaigneau-Brasiers attracted plenty of interest at the annual Paris Motor Shows. A journalist described the 3-litre car of 1928 as sitting on "le châssis le plus moderne du salon [1928]" ("the most modern chassis at the 1928 Paris motor show") but it turned out that the car displayed was only a prototype, and it is not clear if any were actually produced for sale. The company fell into acute financial difficulties. With production capacity at the Ivry plant now badly under used, nemesis was postponed by a major investment from Delahaye who were at this time still short of capacity themselves, and were able to transfer some truck production to the Chaigneau-Brasier plant. Chaigneau-Brasier were therefore able to survive, but only until 1930 or 1931. Sources differ.

== Racing ==
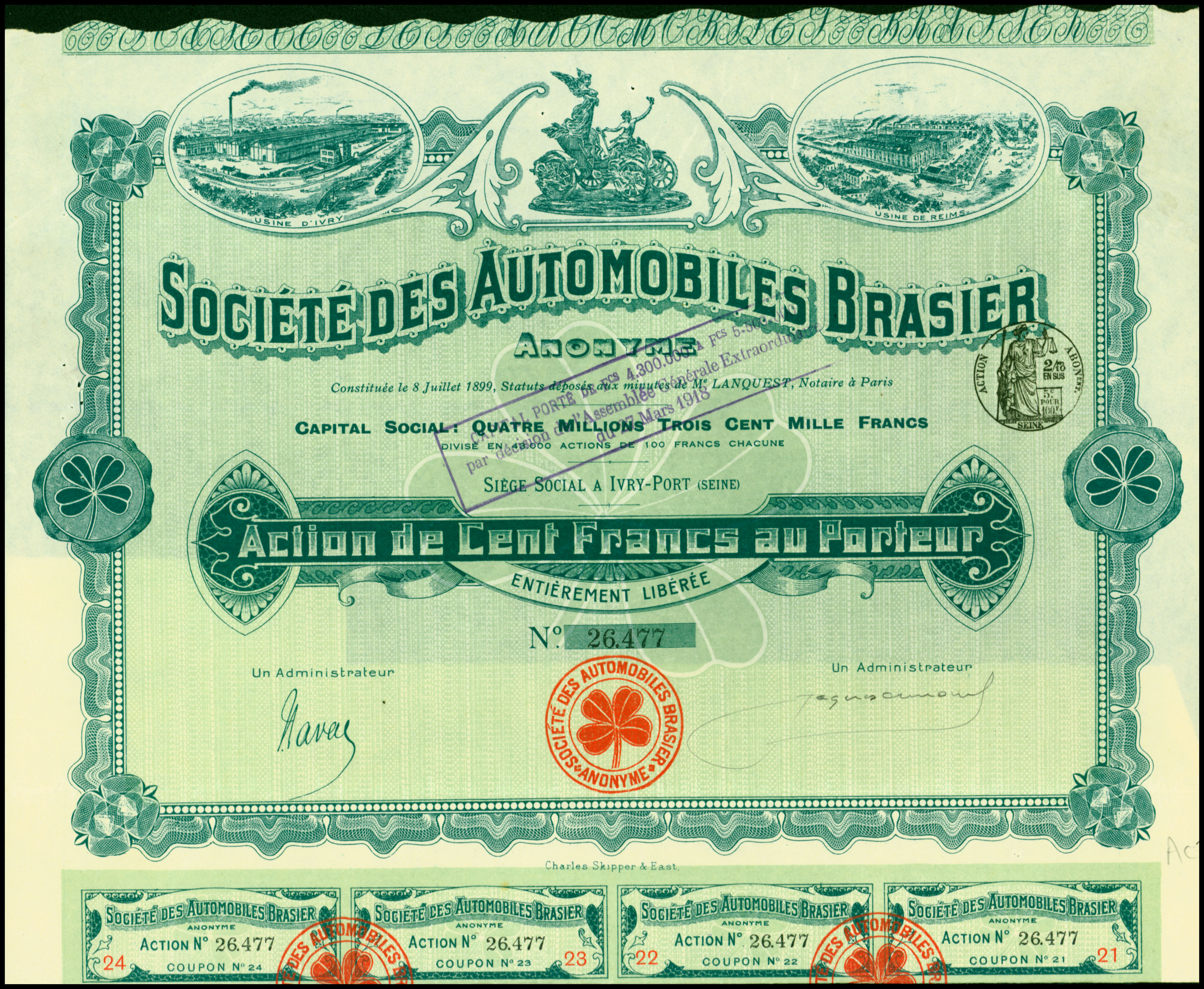
Share of the Société des Automobiles Brasier

Léon Théry entered a Brasier in the 1908 French Grand Prix, but surrendered after 9 laps of the 10 lap race.
