= USS Robert Brazier =

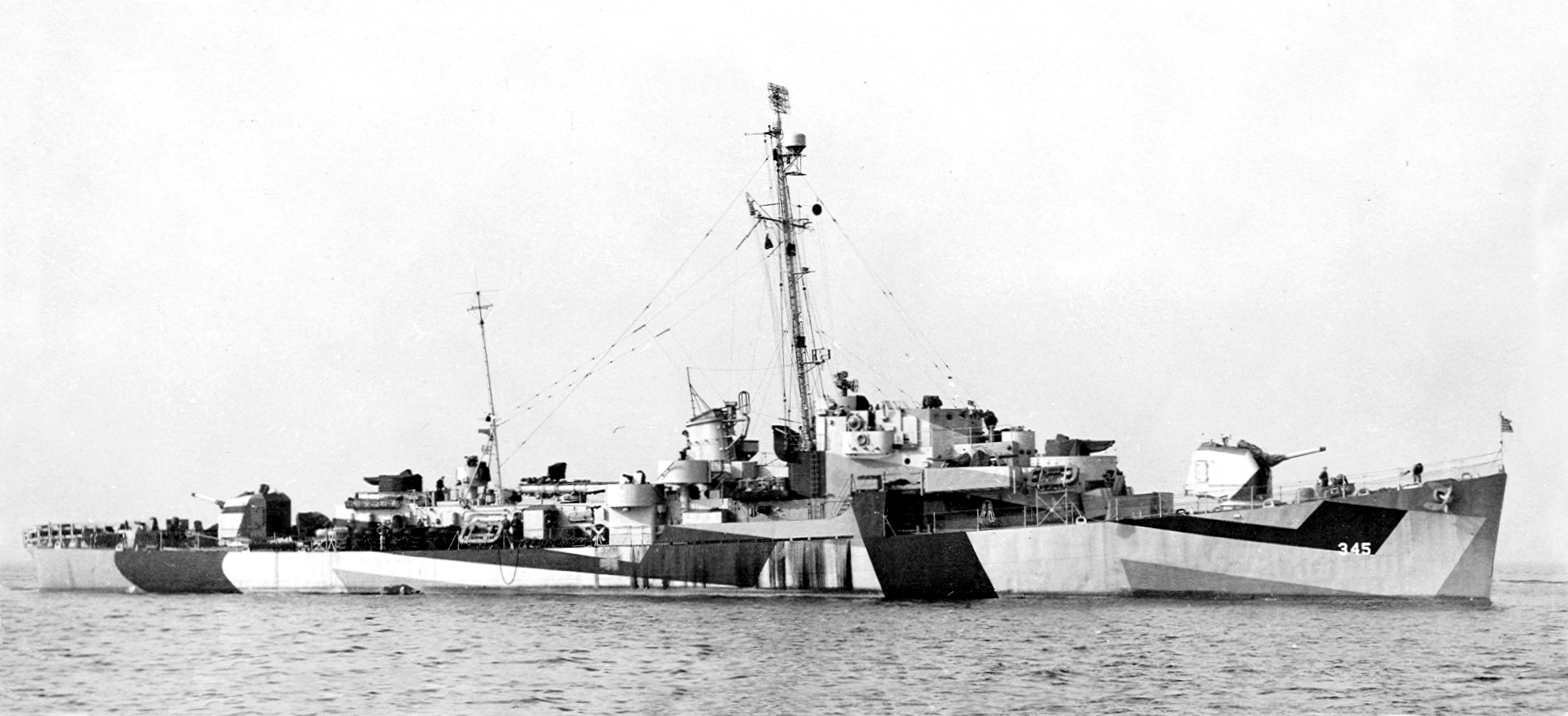
- USS Robert Brazier (DE-345) underway on 18 November 1944

History

United States
- Name: Robert Brazier
- Namesake: Robert Boyd Brazier
- Builder: Consolidated Steel Corporation, Orange, Texas
- Laid down: 16 November 1943
- Launched: 22 January 1944
- Commissioned: 18 May 1944
- Decommissioned: 16 September 1946
- Stricken: 1 January 1968
- Identification: DE-345
- Honours and awards: 1 Battle star for World War II
- Fate: Sunk as target off California 9 January 1969

General characteristics
- Class & type: John C. Butler-class destroyer escort
- Displacement: 1,350 long tons (1,372 t)
- Length: 306 ft (93 m)
- Beam: 36 ft 8 in (11.18 m)
- Draft: 9 ft 5 in (2.87 m)
- Propulsion: 2 boilers, 2 geared turbine engines, 12,000 shp (8,900 kW); 2 propellers
- Speed: 24 knots (44 km/h; 28 mph)
- Range: 6,000 nmi (11,000 km; 6,900 mi) at 12 kn (22 km/h; 14 mph)
- Complement: 14 officers, 201 enlisted
- Armament: 2 × single 5 in (127 mm) guns; 2 × twin 40 mm (1.6 in) AA guns; 10 × single 20 mm (0.79 in) AA guns; 1 × triple 21 in (533 mm) torpedo tubes; 8 × depth charge throwers; 1 × Hedgehog ASW mortar; 2 × depth charge racks

USS Robert Brazier (DE-345) was a John C. Butler-class destroyer escort in service with the United States Navy from 1944 to 1946. She was sunk as a target in 1969.

== Namesake ==
Robert Boyd Brazier was born on 13 June 1916 in Tooele, Utah. He enlisted in the United States Navy on 6 October 1939.

On 4 June 1942 during the Battle of Midway Aviation Radioman Brazier served as a gunner of a Torpedo Squadron Three (VT-3) Douglas TBD Devastator during that battle. Brazier "defended his plane by continuous gunfire against overwhelming fighter opposition until mortally wounded. After reporting his condition, he courageously performed essential radio operations which enabled the pilot to return to his own force." For his actions, Brazier was posthumously awarded the Distinguished Flying Cross.

== History ==
=== Construction and commissioning ===
The ship's keel was laid down 16 November 1943 by the Consolidated Steel Corp., Ltd. at their yard in Orange, Texas. The ship was launched on 22 January 1944; sponsored by Mrs. Celia Brazier, mother of Aviation Radioman Brazier; and commissioned on 18 May 1944.

=== North Atlantic operations ===
Following shakedown off Bermuda, Robert Brazier arrived at New York, 19 August 1944, and the next day commenced escort work with a convoy run to Norfolk, Virginia. There for a week, she served as a school ship for the Destroyer Training School, conducted tests for the Bureau of Ordnance, and assumed duties as flagship, CortDiv 76 which she kept throughout World War II. Between 27 August and 7 September, she participated in a hunt for a German submarine reported off the coast. Later that month, she joined task force TF 69 to escort a fast convoy of tankers and transports to Italy. Completing that run at New York 23 October, she sailed again 10 November, heading south, then west.

Forty-one days later she anchored in Seeadler Harbor, Manus. On 26 December she sailed for Hollandia, whence she escorted tankers to Leyte, arriving 6 January 1945. Continuing escort duty, she plied the sea lanes between Leyte, Kossol Roads, and Hollandia until 19 February when she sailed for Mindoro and duty with the local defense force there. For the next 2 weeks she patrolled the approaches to Mangarin Bay and the convoy lanes to Subic Bay. Then, on 6 March, the destroyer resumed duties as an ocean escort.

=== Supporting the invasion of the Philippines ===
Assigned to the 7th Amphibious Force in late April, Robert Brazier departed Leyte for Panay on 29 April and remained at Iloilo until 4 May. Then ordered back to Leyte, she prepared for the invasion of Mindanao. On 10 May, she screened to the seaward of the landing forces in Macajalar Bay. From 11 to 13 May, the destroyer escort patrolled in the Bay. On 14 May, she departed Mindanao for Cebu, whence she escorted supply ships back to the beachhead and from then, with few interruptions, she remained anchored in Maeajalar Bay until 9 August. Six days later, at Subic Bay, she received news of the Japanese acceptance of surrender terms.

=== End-of-war activity ===
For the remainder of August and into September, she escorted ships between Subic Bay and Okinawa. Then, toward the end of the month, the destroyer extended her escort duty to Tokyo Bay on 21 and 22 September. She returned to Luzon on 27 September and for the next month operated in Philippine waters. On 28 November she got underway for the United States, arriving at San Pedro, Los Angeles, 17 December.

=== Post-war decommissioning ===
Later shifted to San Diego, California, she joined the 19th Fleet and commenced inactivation. Decommissioned on 16 September 1946, she remained in the Pacific Reserve Fleet, berthed initially at San Diego, California, then at Bremerton, Washington, until struck from the Navy list, 1 January 1968. She was subsequently destroyed as a target.

== Awards ==
Robert Brazier (DE-345) earned one battle star during World War II.
