= Edmond (racing driver) =

French Grand Prix driver and aviator (1880–?)

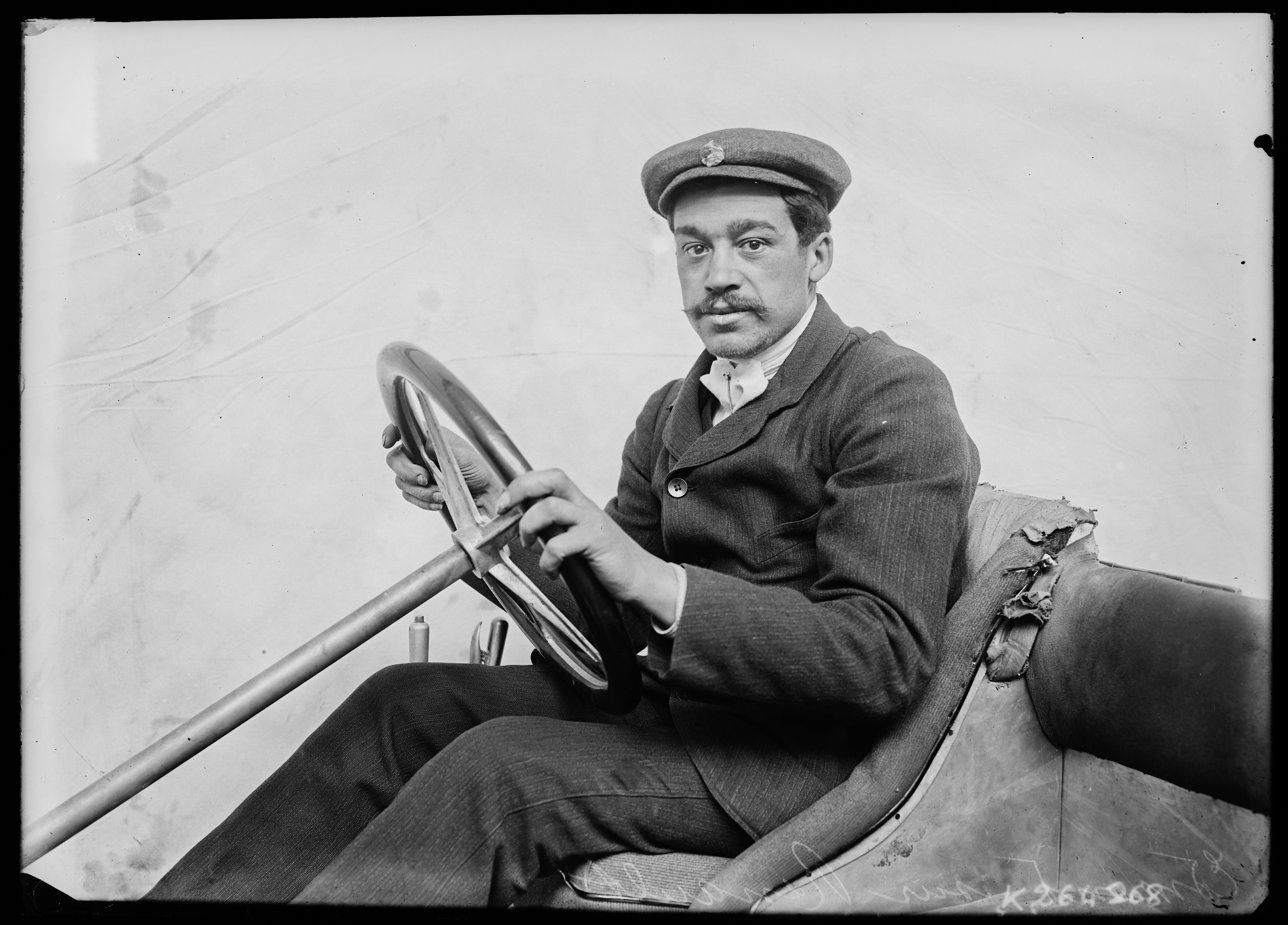
- At the 1907 French Grand Prix
- Born: Edmond Morelle; 3 July 1880 Paris, France
- Died: ?

Edmond Morelle (3 July 1880, Paris - ?) was a pre-First World War racing driver and aviator, using the mononym Edmond.

== Motor racing ==
Edmond's first appearance of note was at the 1902 Paris–Vienna race in June, driving a Darracq in the Light Car class, and he caused a sensation by coming close to winning. He was fifth overall (and leading light car) after the first day's run (to Belfort) where the race was neutralized until leaving Switzerland, but he lost half-an-hour between Innsbruck and Vienna, and finished 23 minutes behind the winner Marcel Renault.

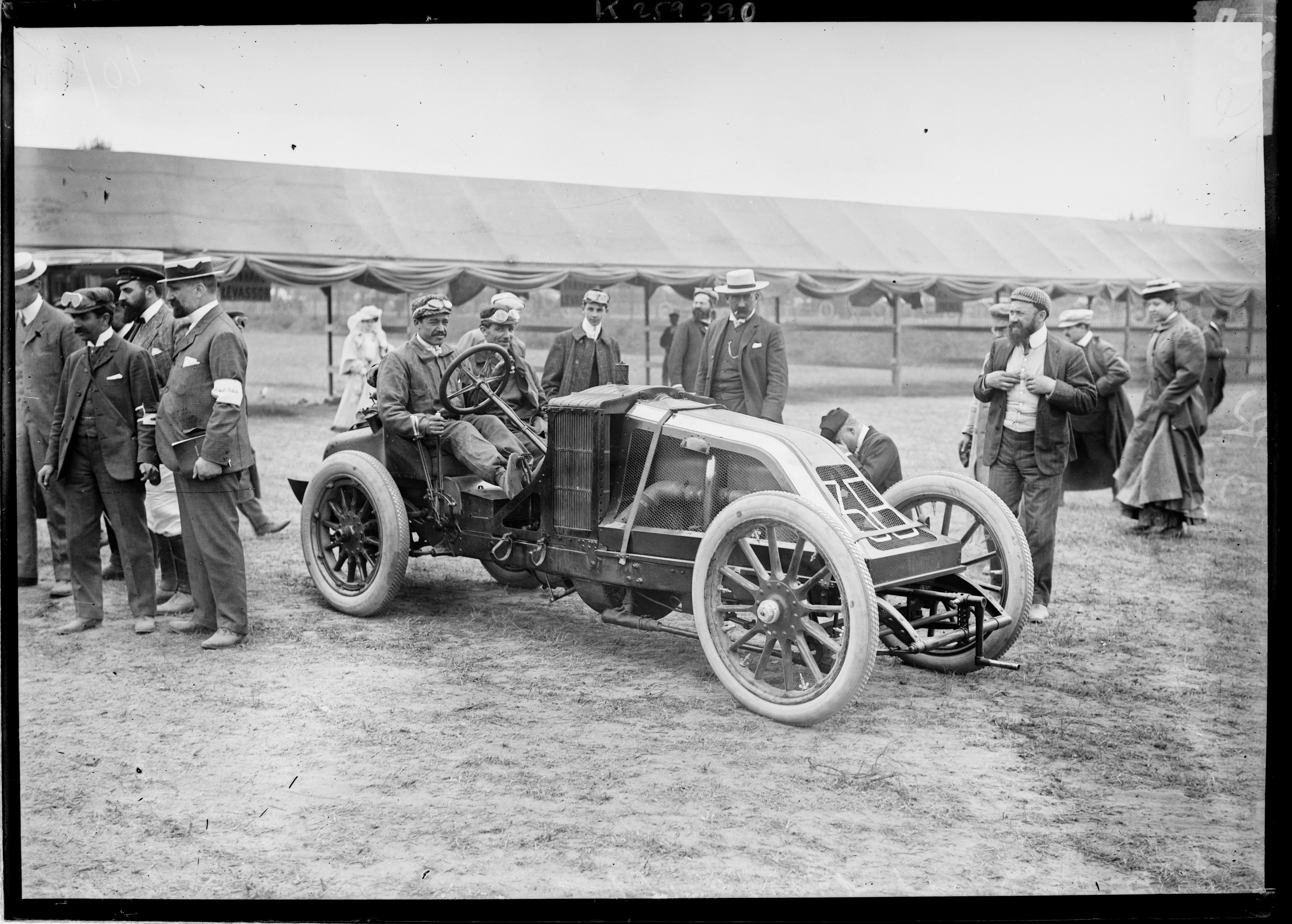
At the 1906 French Grand Prix

The following month, he represented Darracq in the 1902 Circuit des Ardennes, again in the Light Car category; he finished 3rd in class and 9th overall. He also took part in the 1903 Paris–Madrid race which was stopped at Bordeaux due to a number of fatalities, running 31st (and 7th in the Light Car category) at the premature conclusion.

Edmond took part in the British 1904 Gordon Bennett Cup trials on the Isle of Man, driving a Weir, which was a re-branded Darracq (the firm now being under British ownership). The Weirs had been assembled at too short an order, and were unready, Edmond not finishing the race.

He moved to Renault in 1905, finishing 13th in the French eliminating trials for the 1905 Gordon Bennett Cup at Clermont-Ferrand after losing over an hour on the first lap. In 1906 he drove for Renault in the first-ever Grand Prix, but retired after his goggles shattered and his eye was injured by glass and dust. Renault entered him for the 1907 French Grand Prix but he fell ill before the race. and was replaced by Henri Farman.

== Aviation ==
After 1908, he switched from wheels to wings, and became an aviator; in 1910 he obtained pilot licence number 35 in France. At the start of the year, he won the Prix de Vitesse at a meeting in Cannes flying a Farman, and in July took part in an aviation week in St Petersburg, Russia, remaining there afterwards to train new Russian pilots. In August 1910 he took part in air races at Lanark in Scotland, before disappearing into obscurity.
