= 1907 French Grand Prix =

Race details
- Date: July 2, 1907
- Official name: Grand Prix de l'Automobile Club de France
- Location: Dieppe, France
- Course: Public roads
- Course length: 76.989 km (47.840 miles)
- Distance: 10 laps, 769.889 km (478.400 miles)

Fastest lap
Driver	(Belgium) Arthur Duray	Lorraine-Dietrich
- Time: 37:59.8

Podium
First	(Italy) Felice Nazzaro	FIAT
Second	(Hungary) Ferenc Szisz	Renault
Third	(France) Paul Baras	Brasier

The 1907 French Grand Prix was a Grand Prix motor race held at Dieppe on 2 July 1907.

== The Race ==
Thirty-eight cars set off at one-minute intervals to complete 10 laps of a 48-mile (77 km) circuit on a triangular circuit near the city of Dieppe. The field was led away by Vincenzo Lancia's Fiat. The race was run under a fuel consumption limit of 30 litres per 100 kilometres (7.84 miles per US gallon; 9.42 miles per imperial gallon). Louis Wagner led the race for the first three laps. After Wagner retired on lap four, Arthur Duray took the lead. Duray set the fastest lap, with an average speed of 75.40 mph (121.34 km/h), and led the race until his retirement on lap nine. Felice Nazzaro's Fiat led from this point until the finish, completing the race over six and a half minutes ahead of second placed Ferenc Szisz. Nazzaro's average speed was 70.6 mph (113.6 km/h) for the race.

=== Death ===
Albert Clément died in a crash during practice while driving his Clément-Bayard. His place in the race was taken by 'Alezy'.

== Classification ==
Pos	No	Driver	Car	Laps	Time/Retired	Image
1	F2	(Italy) Felice Nazzaro	Fiat 130 HP	10	6:46:33.0	
2	R1	(Hungary) Ferenc Szisz	Renault AK		+6:37.6	
3	B2	(France) Paul Baras	Brasier		+18:32.6	
4	LD3	(France) Fernand Gabriel	Lorraine-Dietrich		+25:06.0	
5	D3	(France) Victor Rigal	Darracq		+26:03.4	
6	D2	(France) Gustave Caillois	Darracq		+29:25.6	
7	B1	(France) Jules Barillier	Brasier		+41:21.0	
8	BC1	(France) Pierre Garcet	Clément-Bayard		+47:44.0	
9	BC3	(United States) Elliott Shepard	Clément-Bayard		+53:23.2	
10	M3	(France) Victor Hémery	Mercedes		+1:38:52.0	
11	MB3	(France) Courtade	Motobloc		+2:02:00.6	
12	B3	(France) Paul Bablot	Brasier		+2:26:26.6	
13	R3	(France) Claude Richez	Renault AK		+2:44:19.4	
14	GE2	(France) François Degrais	Germain		+3:04:03.4	
15	GE3	(Belgium) François-Marie Roch-Brault	Germain		+3:24:12.0	
16	C1	(France) Joseph Collomb	Corre		+3:38:23.7	
17	GE1	(Belgium) Perpère	Germain		+4:07:09.0	
Ret	F1	(Italy) Vincenzo Lancia	Fiat	9	Clutch	
Ret	M2	(Germany) Otto Salzer	Mercedes	9		
Ret	LD1	(Belgium) Arthur Duray	Lorraine-Dietrich	8		
Ret	PL3	(France) Dutemple	Panhard	8		
Ret	M1	(Belgium) Camille Jenatzy	Mercedes	7		
Ret	MB1	(France) Pierron	Motobloc	7		
Ret	DM1	(Switzerland) Frederic Dufaux	Marchand	7		
Ret	R2	(France) Henry Farman	Renault AK	7		
Ret	D1	(France) René Hanriot	Darracq	6	Engine	
Ret	LD2	(France) Henri Rougier	Lorraine-Dietrich	5		
Ret	GB1	(France) Louis Rigolly	Gobron-Brillié	5		
Ret	W2	(United Kingdom) Pryce Harrison	Weigel	5		
Ret	MB2	Page	Motobloc	5		
Ret	P1	(France) Emile Stricker	Porthos	4	Steering	
Ret	BC2	(France) Alezy	Clément-Bayard	4		
Ret	WC1	(United States) Walter Christie	Christie	4		
Ret	F3	(France) Louis Wagner	Fiat	3	Valve gear	
Ret	W1	(United Kingdom) Gregor Laxen	Weigel	3	Wheel	
Ret	PL2	(France) Hubert Le Blon	Panhard	3	Driver injury	
Ret	PL1	(United States) George Heath	Panhard	1	Engine	

Grand Prix Race
Previous race: None	1907 Grand Prix season Grandes Épreuves	Next race: None
Previous race: 1906 French Grand Prix	French Grand Prix	Next race: 1908 French Grand Prix
