= Albert Clément =

French racing driver (1883–1907)

- Born: Henri Albert Clément; 7 July 1883; France
- Died: 17 May 1907 (aged 23); Dieppe, France
- Occupation: Racing driver
- Parent(s): Adolphe Clément Bayard; Céleste Angèle Roguet

Henri Albert Clément (7 July 1883 – 17 May 1907, Dieppe, Seine-Maritime) was a French motor racing driver. In 1904 he won the II Ardennes Cup race and finished third in the III Ardennes Cup race at Bastogne. He also finished second in the Vanderbilt Cup on Long Island. In 1906 he finished third in the inaugural French Grand Prix and 4th in the Vanderbilt Cup. All his driving was in the Clément-Bayard factory team that was owned by his father Adolphe Clément-Bayard.

Albert Clément died during practice for the 1907 French Grand Prix at Dieppe whereupon his father lost interest in motor racing. The Clément-Bayard team was withdrawn at the end of 1908.

== Family life ==
Albert was the eldest of Adolphe Clément and Céleste Angèle Roguet's four children, Albert, Angèle, Jeanne and Maurice. Angèle (1880–1972) was widowed from Albert Dumont, a director at the family's factory, then remarried Numa Joseph Edouard "Petit" Sasias with whom she had one son. Jeanne divorced Fernand Charron, racing driver and manager of the plant at Levallois-Perret. Maurice married Renée Hammond and had three children Andrée, Jacqueline and Albert (who was nicknamed "Billy" to avoid confusion and memories of his uncle Albert).

In the year after Albert's death his father changed the family name to Clément-Bayard to emulate the Clément-Bayard automobile brand. It honoured the Chevalier Pierre Terrail, seigneur de Bayard who saved the town of Mézières from an Imperial army during the Siege of Mézières in 1521.

== Motor racing ==
Clément-Bayard started building automobiles in 1903 and then started building racing cars in 1904. The racing team included Albert Clément among others.

=== 1904 season ===
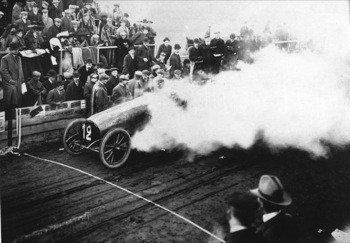
Albert Clement drives an 80-hp Clément-Bayard at the 1905 Vanderbilt Cup

Clément finished 10th at the I Eliminatoires Françaises de la Coupe Internationale, held at the Forest of Argonne on 20 May 1904. This was a qualifying contest for the French entry into the Coupe Internationale (Gordon Bennett Race) where only three cars were allowed per country. Clement finished the 6 lap, 532.79 km event in 7 hours 10 minutes 52.8 seconds.

Clément won the II Circuit des Ardennes des Voiturettes on 24 July 1904 at Bastogne. He completed the 5 lap 240.010 km race in 4h 26m 52.6seconds at an average speed of 53.91 km/h in an 18Hp Clement -(Bayard?) (car no 5). He also set the fastest lap of the race at 45 minutes 2 seconds (63.89 km/h).

Clément drove his Clement-Bayard into third place at the III Circuit des Ardennes race at Bastogne, on 25 July 1904. He completed the 5 lap, 591.255 km event in 6 hours 34 minutes 43.2 seconds.

Clément finished second at the 1904 I.W.K. Vanderbilt Cup Race on Long Island on 8 October 1904. He led during the eighth lap of the ten lap race and finished the 457.686 km event in 5 hours 28 minutes 13 seconds.

=== 1905 season ===
Clément retired his Clement-Bayard with overheating after 1 lap of the II Eliminatoires Françaises de la Coupe Internationale at the Auvergne on 16 June. This was a qualifier for the Coupe Internationale (Gordon Bennett Race).

At the 1905 Vanderbilt cup on Long Island Clément drove an 80-hp Clément-Bayard (France #12) but suffered reliability problems.

Clément retired his Clement-Bayard after the first 166 km lap of the II Coppa Florio at Brescia Italy on 4 September 1905.

=== 1906 season ===
Albert Clément driving a Clément-Bayard at the French Grand Prix 1906

Clément-Bayard entered 3 cars for the 1906 French Grand Prix at Le Mans where Clément finished third in his 100Hp machine. He completed the 1,238 km event in 12 hours 49 minutes 46.2seconds. Clément lead the race at the end of laps 2 and 5 on the second day. Punctures were common and tyre manufacturer Michelin introduced a detachable rim with a tyre already affixed, which could be swapped in about 4 minutes car after a puncture, saving 11 minutes over manually replacing the tyre. These wheels were used by Felice Nazzaro on his FIAT enabling him to wrest second place from Clément on the second day. His father Adolphe was the owner of Dunlop France.

Clément finished 6th in the V Circuit des Ardennes on 13 August 1906 at Bastogne. He completed the 7 lap 961 km race in 6 hours 2 minutes 55.2 seconds in a 100Hp Clement-Bayard.

At the 1906 Vanderbilt cup Clément finished 4th driving a 100 hp (75 kW) Clément-Bayard (France #15) and completing the ten laps averaging 59.0 mph (95.0 km/h).

=== 1907 season ===
Albert Clément died while practising for the 1907 French Grand Prix on 17 May. Of the 3 other Clément-Bayard entries, Pierre Garcet and Elliott Shepard, finished 7th and eighth respectively. Clément's car was entered by 'Alezy' who retired after 4 laps.
