= Motobloc =

French automobile manufacturer

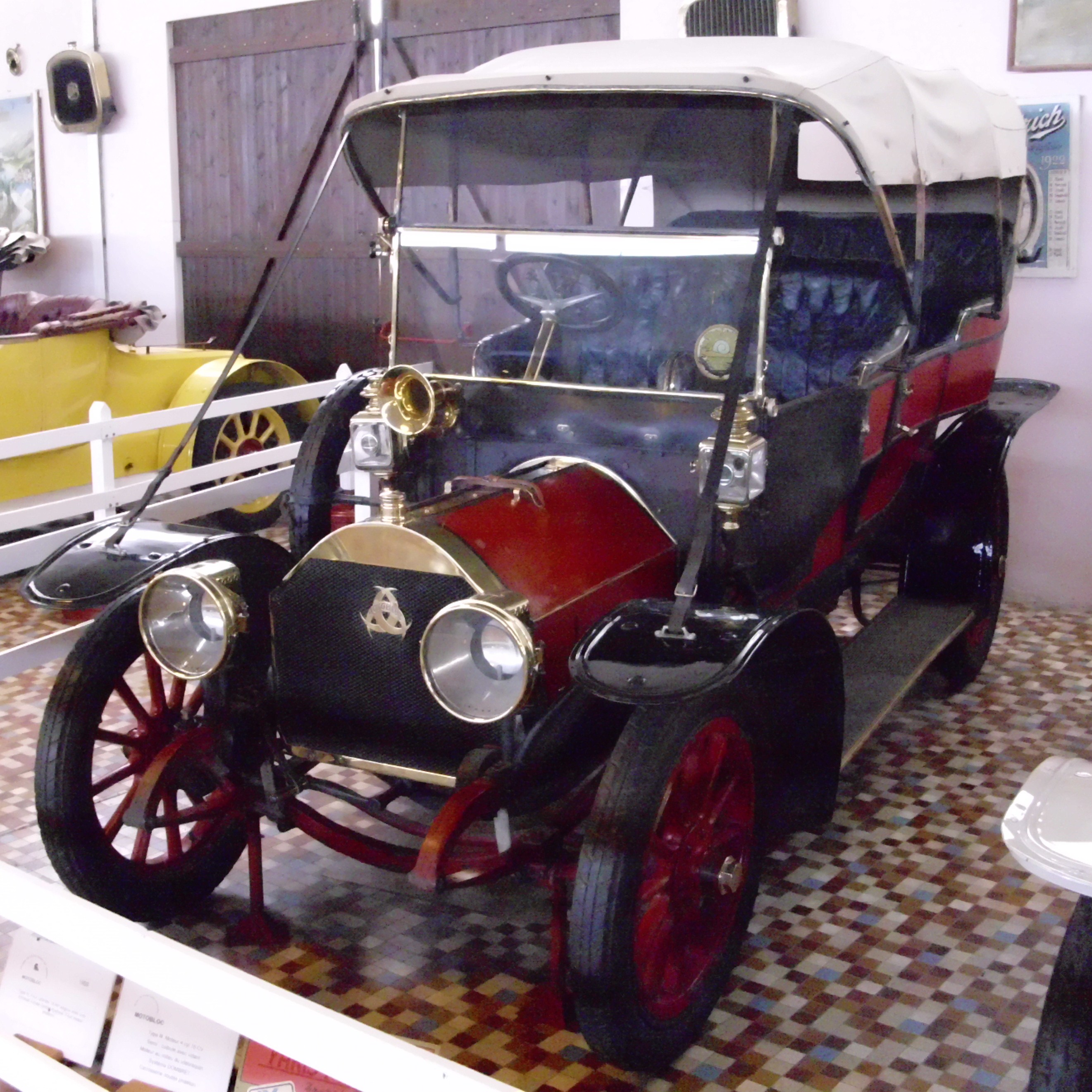
Motobloc (1908)

Motobloc was a French automobile manufacturer, building vehicles from 1902 to 1931 in a factory in Bordeaux.

== History ==
The company was a descendant of the earlier Schaudel marque, which was noted for the development of an innovative engine design which combined the engine, clutch and gearbox in a single main casing. Unfortunately, this made it so that engine oil would seep into the transmission. Schaudel constructed automobiles from 1900 to 1902, and in June 1902 "la Societe Anonyme des automobiles Motobloc" was established to continue vehicle production based on the Schaudel designs.

A 1908 model Motobloc was among the six entries in the 1908 New York to Paris Race. Motobloc entered the race at its start in New York but withdrew in Iowa due to breakdowns and a lack of funds. The name Motobloc is one of the car company names featured on a placard at the beginning of the movie Chitty Chitty Bang Bang
