= Automobiles Darracq France =

French motor vehicle manufacturer

A Darracq et Cie société en commandite
- Type: Société en commandite
- Industry: Cycle and Automotive
- Founded: February 1897
- Fate: sold to A.Darracq & Company Limited in 1902
- Headquarters: Suresnes, France
- Key people: Alexandre Darracq, founder
- Products: Automobiles

Darracq S.A. later Talbot S.A.
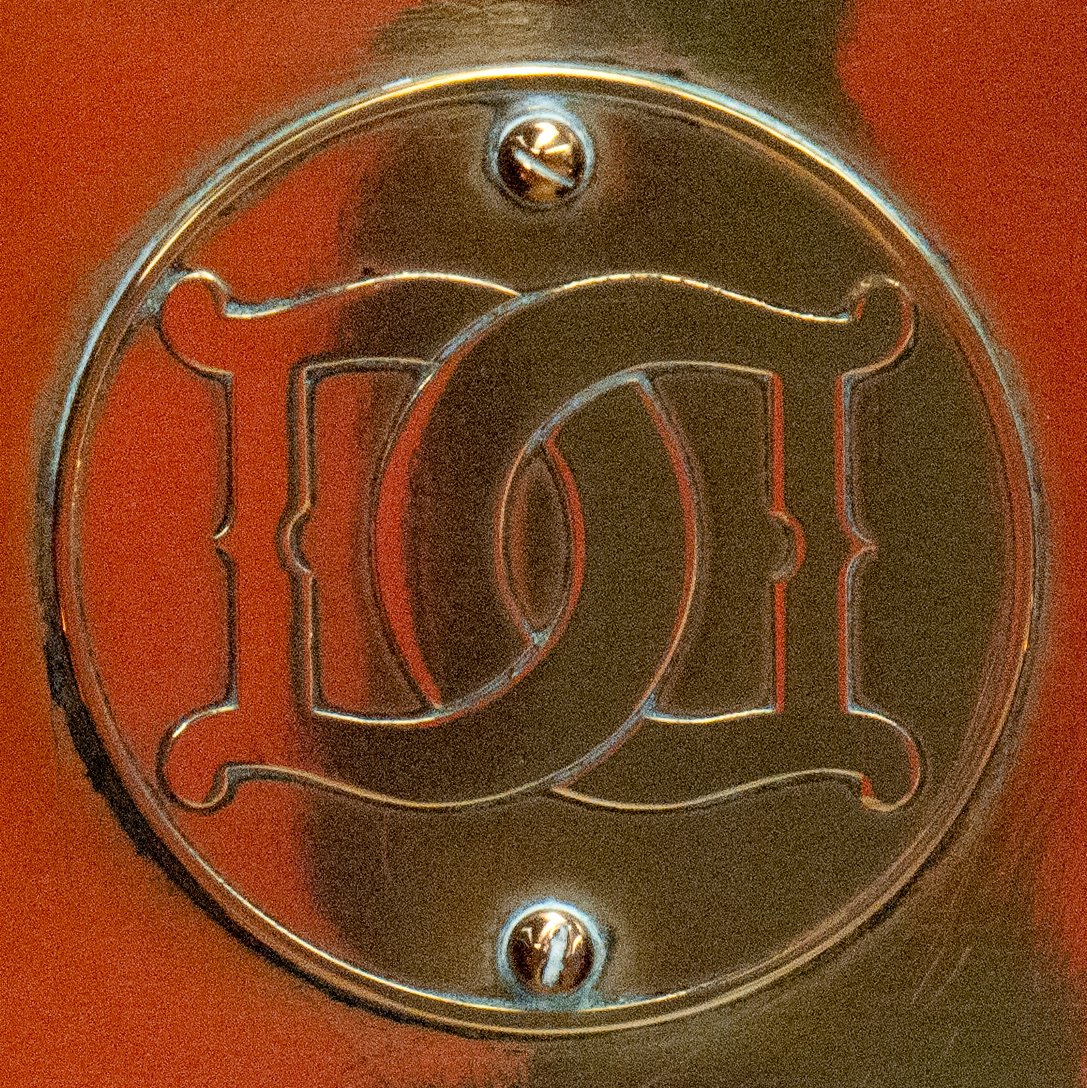
- Type: Société Anonyme
- Industry: Automotive
- Founded: 1916
- Founder: A Darracq and Company (1905) Limited (London)
- Defunct: 1959
- Headquarters: Suresnes, Paris, France
- Parent: A Darracq and Company (1905) Limited —renamed 1920 —S.T.D. Motors Limited

Automobiles Darracq France was a manufacturer of motor vehicles and aero engines in Suresnes, near Paris, France. The enterprise, known at first as A Darracq et Cie, was founded in 1896 by successful businessman Alexandre Darracq.

In 1902, he sold his new business to a privately held English company named A Darracq and Company Limited, retaining a substantial shareholding and a directorship. He continued to run the business from Paris but was obliged to retire to the Côte d'Azur in 1913, due to years of financial difficulties that brought his business into very hazardous circumstances. He had introduced an unproven unorthodox engine in 1911 which failed, yet he neglected Suresnes' popular conventional products. France entered the First World War shortly after.

In 1916, ownership of the Suresnes business was transferred to Darracq S.A. In 1922, Darracq's name was dropped from its products and the business was renamed Talbot S.A.. Initially, its products were branded Darracq-Talbot and then just Talbot. The London parent company suffered a financial collapse during the Great Depression and in 1935, Talbot S.A. was acquired by investors led by managing director Antonio Lago.

== History ==
=== Automobiles Darracq et Cie ===
A. Darracq et Cie was created in 1897 by Alexandre Darracq, who used a substantial part of the profit he had made from selling his Gladiator bicycle factory to build a new plant in Suresnes. Production began in January 1898 with bicycle parts, tricycles and quadricycles, and a Millet motorcycle powered by a five-cylinder rotary engine. An electric brougham shortly followed. Also in 1898, Darracq et Cie produced a Léon Bollée-designed voiturette tricar. The somewhat old-fashioned voiturette proved to be a debacle: its steering was problematic, the five-speed belt drive was described as "a masterpiece of bad design", and the crude hot tube ignition further compounded its flaws. In the end, the £10,000 Darracq et Cie had paid for the design turned out to be a costly mistake.

In 1900, Darracq et Cie produced a vehicle designed by Paul Ribeyrolles. (Note: Ribeyrolles (Paul), 3 rue de Jourdain, Paris — né à Paris en 1874 — Ingénieur des usines Darracq et cie — Diplomé de l'Ecole des Arts et Metiers de Châlons. Franchising opportunities, 1911) It was a 6.5 hp (4.8 kW; 6.6 PS) voiture legére with a 785 cc (47.9 cu in) single-cylinder engine. The car featured a shaft drive and a three-speed column gear change.

==== Accelerator ====
Though larger it was remarkably similar to a current Renault design. Its notable innovation was the provision of a system to vary engine speed between 100 rpm and 2,000 rpm. This was accomplished by regulating the engine's ignition and its inlet valves. By the end of September 1901 they had sold more than 1,000 of these cars but with only 300 employees Suresnes must have been essentially an assembly business.

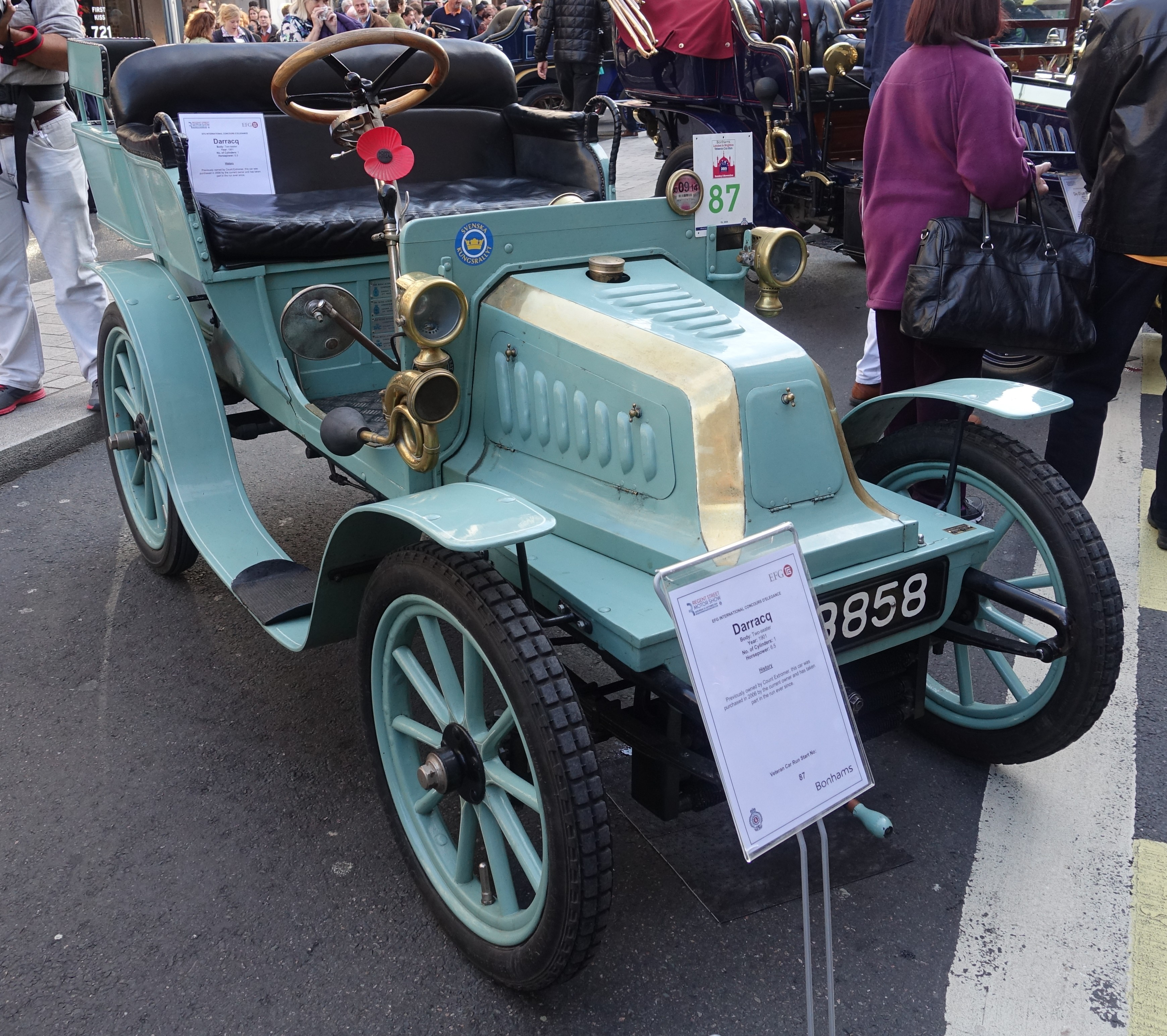
6.5 CV single cylinder two-seater this particular car was made in 1901

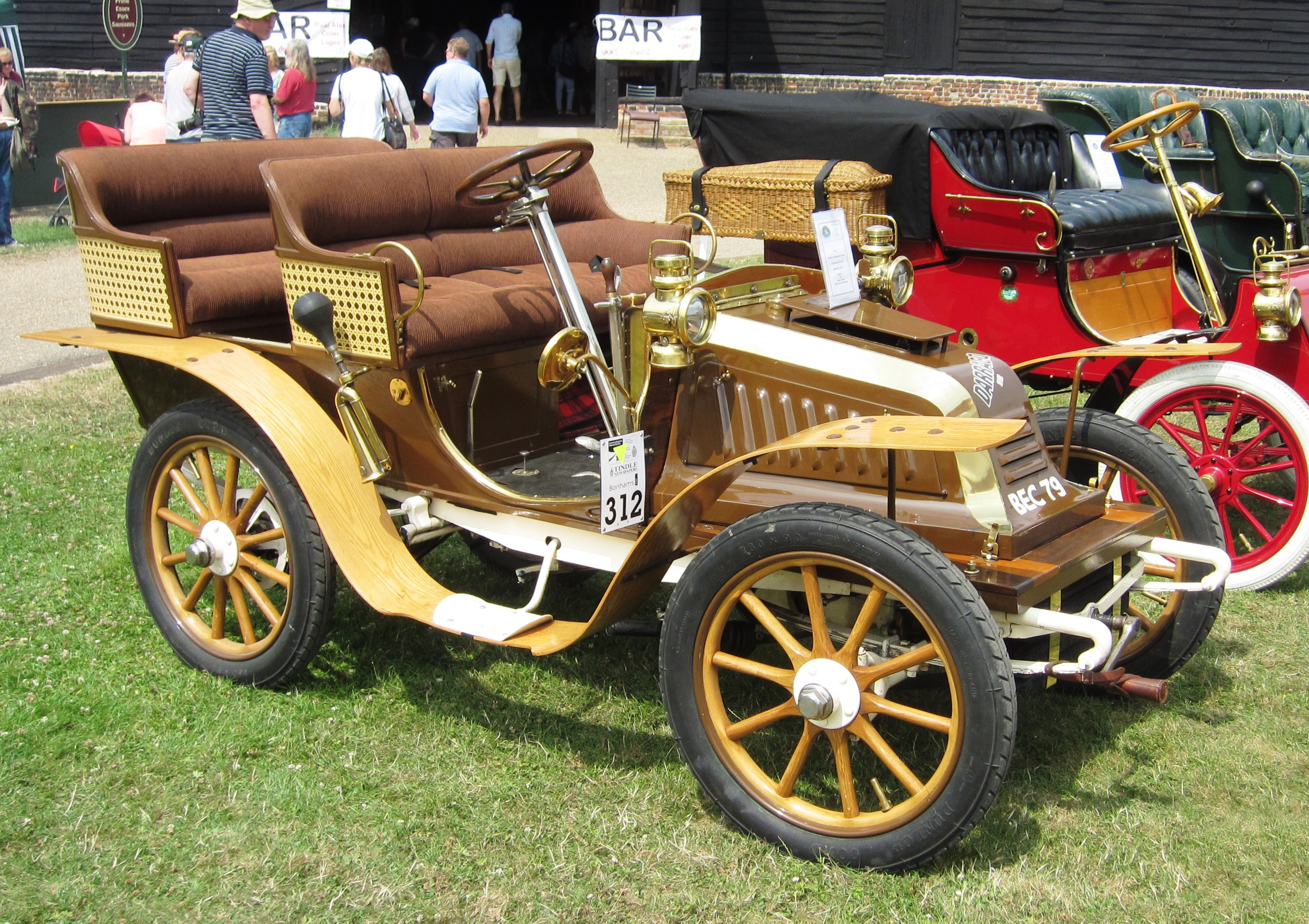
9 CV single cylinder tonneau 1902

==== Opel Darracq ====
In 1902, A. Darracq et Cie signed a contract with Adam Opel to produce vehicles in the German Empire under the licence, with the brand name "Opel Darracq". Opel soon moved on to building its own vehicles.

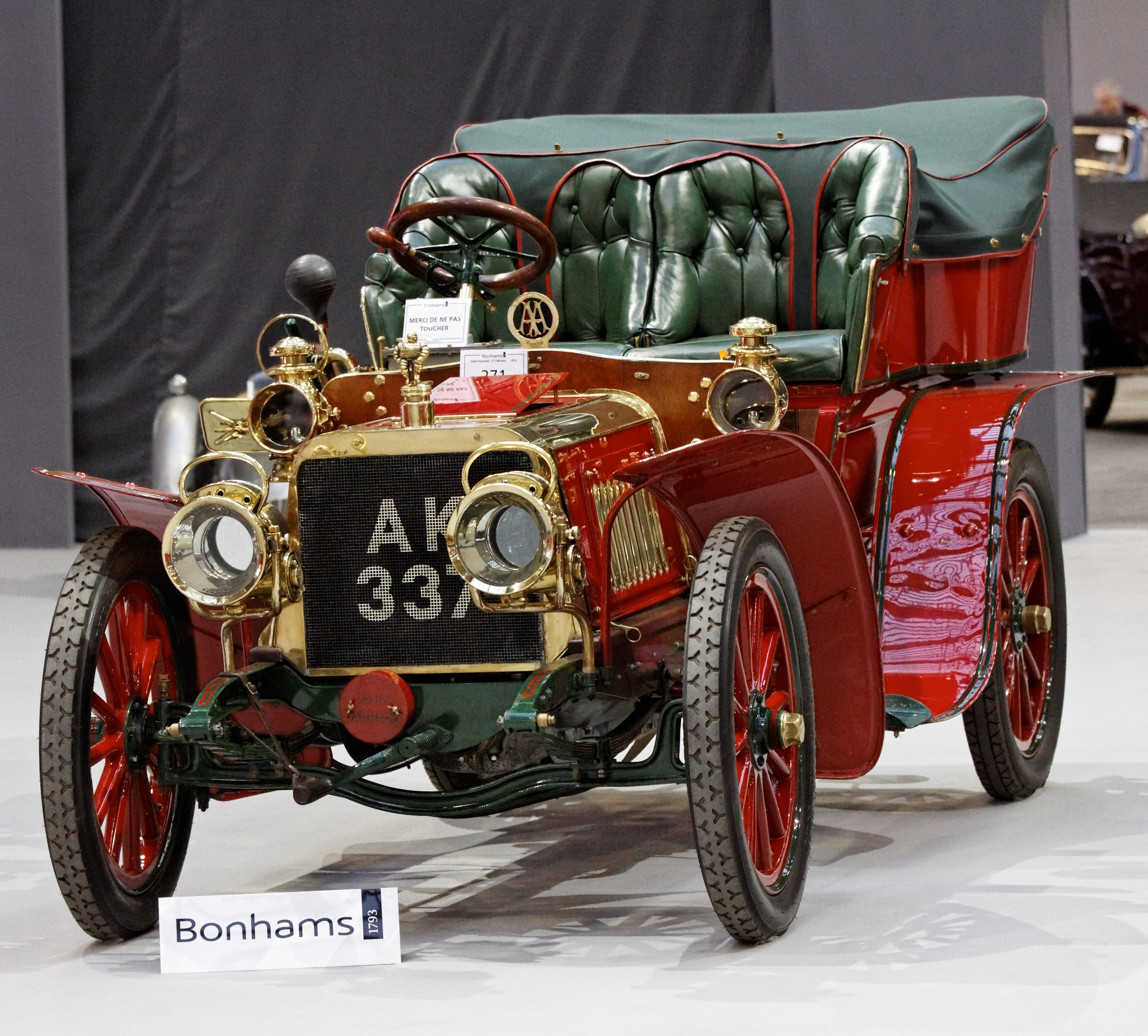
Darracq's famous "flying" Fifteen rear entrance tonneau body

=== A Darracq and Company Limited ===
A. Darracq et Cie was sold as of 30 September 1902 to A. Darracq and Company Limited, an English company. Alexandre Darracq had a substantial minority holding. J S Smith-Winby was appointed chairman. Further capital was raised and large sums were spent on factory expansion, the Suresnes site was expanded to some four acres in extent, and in England extensive premises were bought.

=== Darracq holder of six world speed records ===
A. Darracq and Company Limited prospered. By 1903, four models were offered: a 1.1-litre single, a 1.3 L and 1.9 L twin, and a 3.8 L four. For 1904 models, Darracq abandoned flitch-plated wood chassis for pressed steel. The new Flying Fifteen, powered by a 3-litre four, had its chassis made from a single sheet of steel. This car was Alexandre Darracq's chef d'oeuvre. There was nothing outstanding in its design but "every part was in such perfect balance and harmony" it became an outstanding model. Its exceptional quality helped the company capture a ten percent share of the French auto market.

In late 1904 the chairman reported sales were up by 20 per cent though increased costs meant the profit had risen more slowly. But what was more important was they had many more orders than they could fill and the only solution was to enlarge the factory by as much as 50 per cent. Twelve months later, the chairman was able to tell shareholders all the six speed records of the automobile world were held by Darracq cars and they had all been held more than twelve months and yet another had recently been added by K Lee Guinness.

=== Società Italiana Automobili Darracq ===
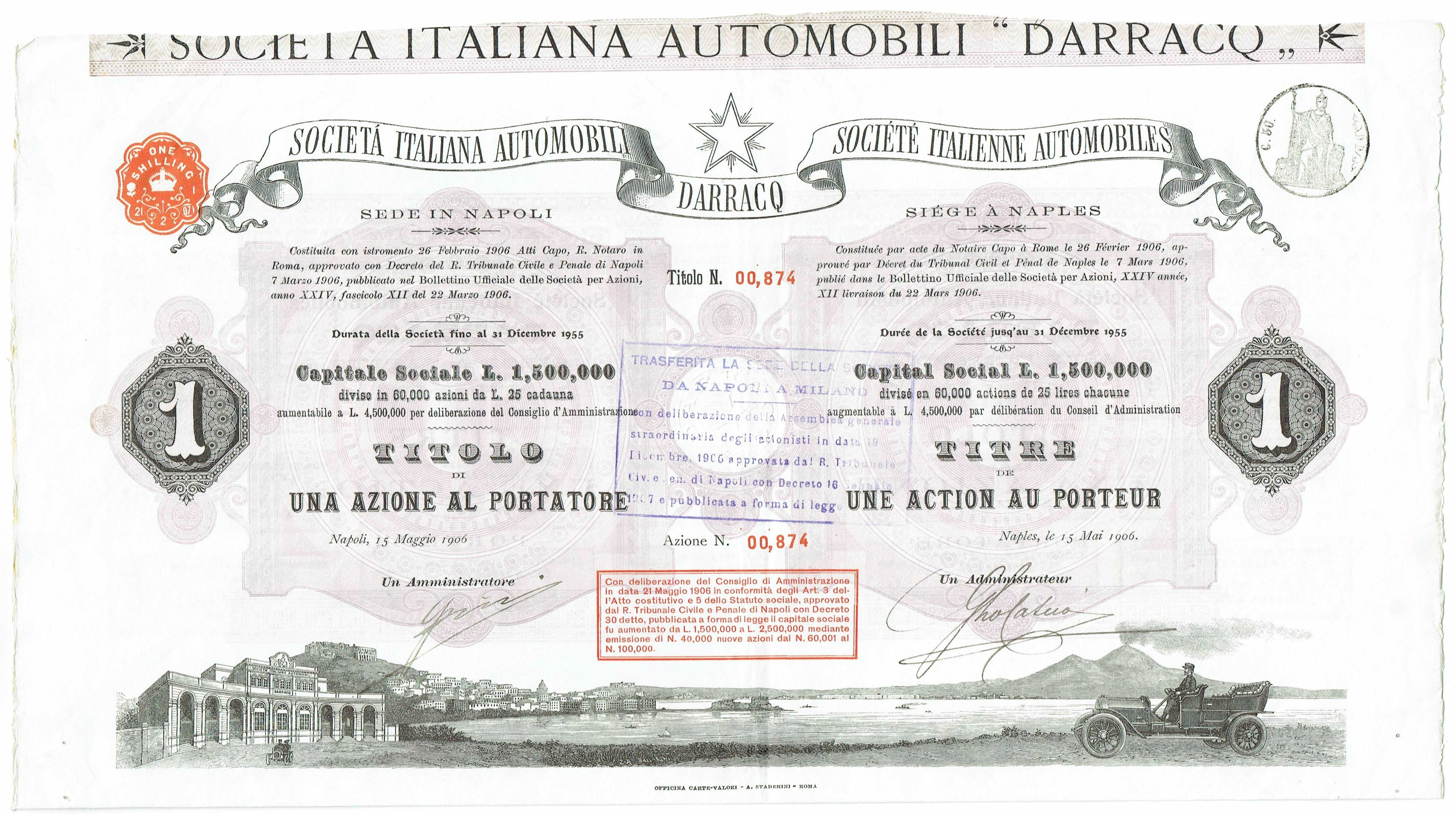
Share of the Società Italiana Automobili Darracq, issued 15. May 1906

As a separate venture from his role, as the head of A. Darracq and Company Limited, Alexandre Darracq established Società Italiana Automobili Darracq (SIAD) in Portello, a suburb of Milan in Italy in 1906, through a licensing arrangement with Cavaliere Ugo Stella, an aristocrat from Milan. The business did not perform well and Darracq shut it down in 1910. The business was subsequently acquired by a new partnership, Anonima Lombarda Fabbrica Automobili (ALFA), acquired the business, and in 1914 Nicola Romeo bought ALFA and later became known as Alfa Romeo.

=== Sociedad Anonima Espanola de Automoviles Darracq ===
Alexandre Darracq also formed Sociedad Anonima Espanola de Automoviles Darracq in Vitoria, Spain in 1912, with a capitalization of 1,000,000 pesetas.

=== Cabs ===
An order was accepted from a M. Charley for several thousand cabs to sell to franchised operators in major European and American cities. Darracq ordered 4,000 chassis frames and built a new factory beside the existing one, except in New York. However, the cabs were not as popular as the Renault and Unic competition. By 1907, one-third of New York's 1,800 cabs were Darracq vehicles. It was useful business during the recession of 1908 but Darracq turned his attention to heavy motor vehicles.

By the end of 1909, Compagnie Internationale des Wagons-Lits then known as International Sleeping Car Co Ltd got approval to run taxi service in major cities of India then British India for which they contracted Automobiles Darracq France then known Darracq Co to supply 3,000 units of 1910 models powered by 14-16 hp engines.

=== Steam buses ===
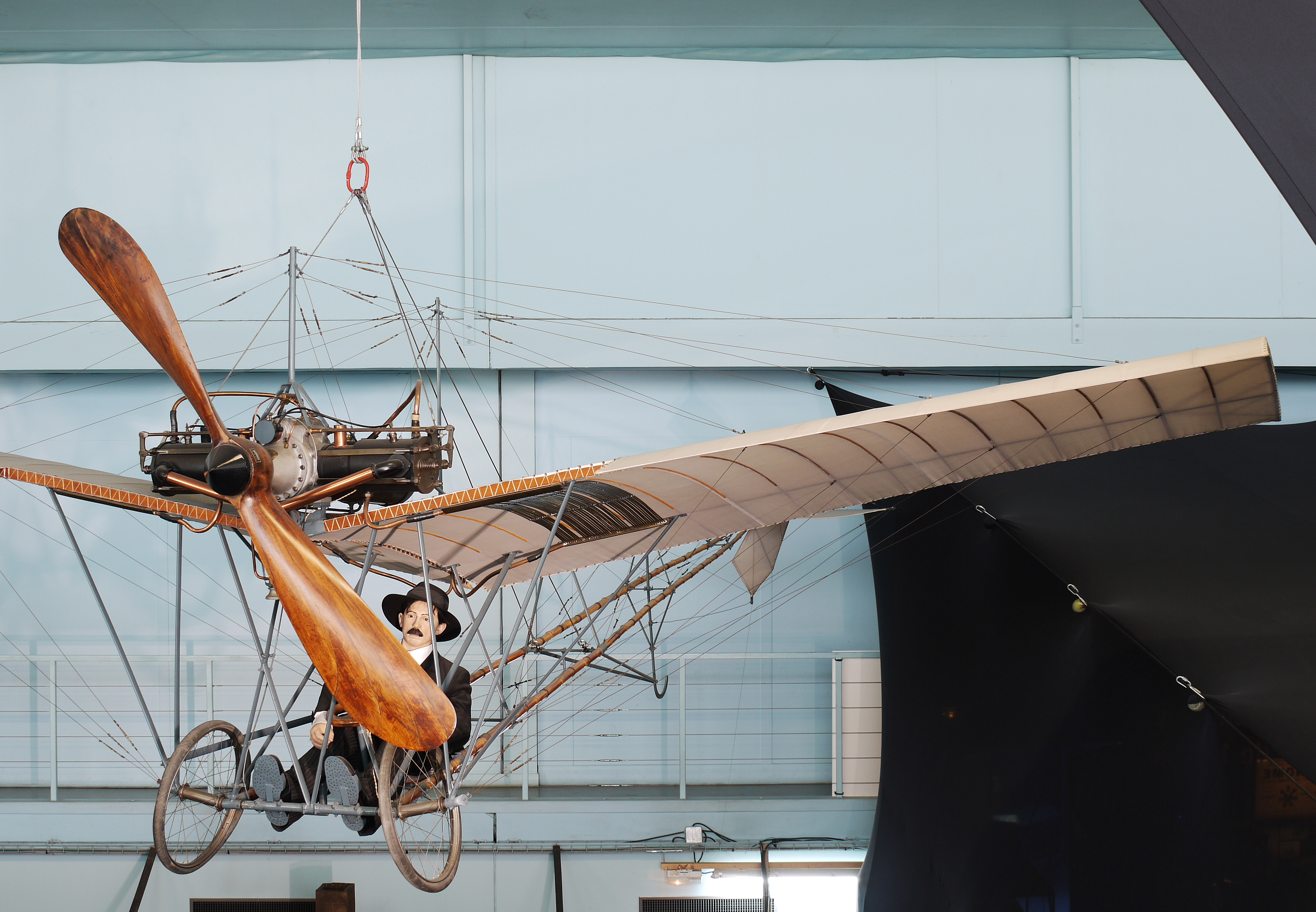
Darracq engined Demoiselle of Alberto Santos-Dumont

A joint venture into steam buses, designed by Leon Serpollet was not a success. Only twenty units were sold, and Darracq and Co lost money on the project. London's Darracq-Serpollet Omnibus Company incorporated in May 1906 was hampered by delays in building a new factory with the death of Léon Serpollet from cancer in early 1907 at the age of 48. The nurse of either Mr Nickols or Mr Karslake believed the steam buses would blow up and would not allow any of her patients travel on one. The unpopular buses proved to have a brief uneconomic service life and their manufacturer was liquidated in 1912. As a result, Darracq and Co had to write off an investment of £156,000, representing a substantial portion of their capital.

=== Aviation ===
In 1907, Alexandre Darracq became interested in aviation, and by 1909, Darracq S.A. started building light aero engines, used by Louis Blériot and Alberto Santos-Dumont. These engines were clearly based on their racing engines, and there may have been just two built.

=== Competition ===
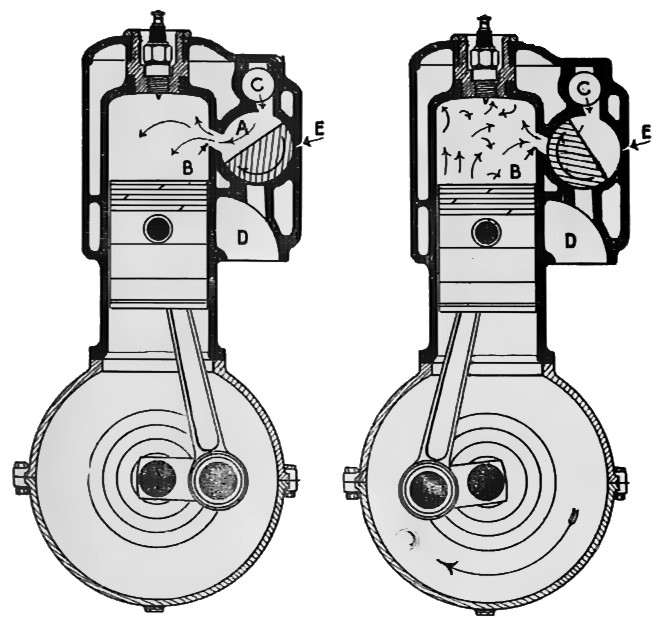
Darracq rotary valve engine

After 1907, it became harder to sell Darracq's cars. Prices had to be cut, and new models did not attract the expected customers. Returning to Alexandre Darracq's 1898 idea to build low-cost, good-quality cars, much like Henry Ford was doing with the Model T, Darracq S.A. introduced a £260 14–16 hp (10–12 kW; 14–16 PS) model at the very end of 1911. These, at the founder's insistence, would all be cursed with the Henriod (Note: C E Henriod & Cie manufacturers of the change-speed rear axles where the change-speed box forms part of the differential casing) rotary valve engine, which was underpowered and prone to seizing. The new engine's failure was reported by Darracq & Company London to its shareholders to be no more than the difficulty of achieving quantity production. It proved disastrous for the marque, and Alexandre Darracq would be obliged to resign.

In late 1911, Alexandre Darracq was replaced by a new manager, his former chief engineer, Paul Ribeyrolles who was the former head of Gladiator inventor, and motor racing enthusiast. In June 1912, Darracq resigned, after selling all his shares. A main board director, Hopkins, was sent to Paris to take charge of general administration, while Owen Clegg, the former Rover Company chief engineer, was recalled from the USA, where he was studying production methods at Darracq's expense, and appointed as the works manager. At the end of 1912, the chairman reassured shareholders that a return on their investment in the valveless motor would arrive in 1913.

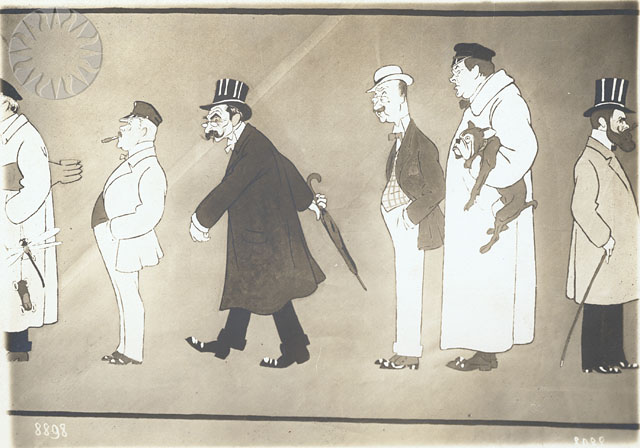
M. Alexandre Darracq caricatured with other automobile and aviation pioneers

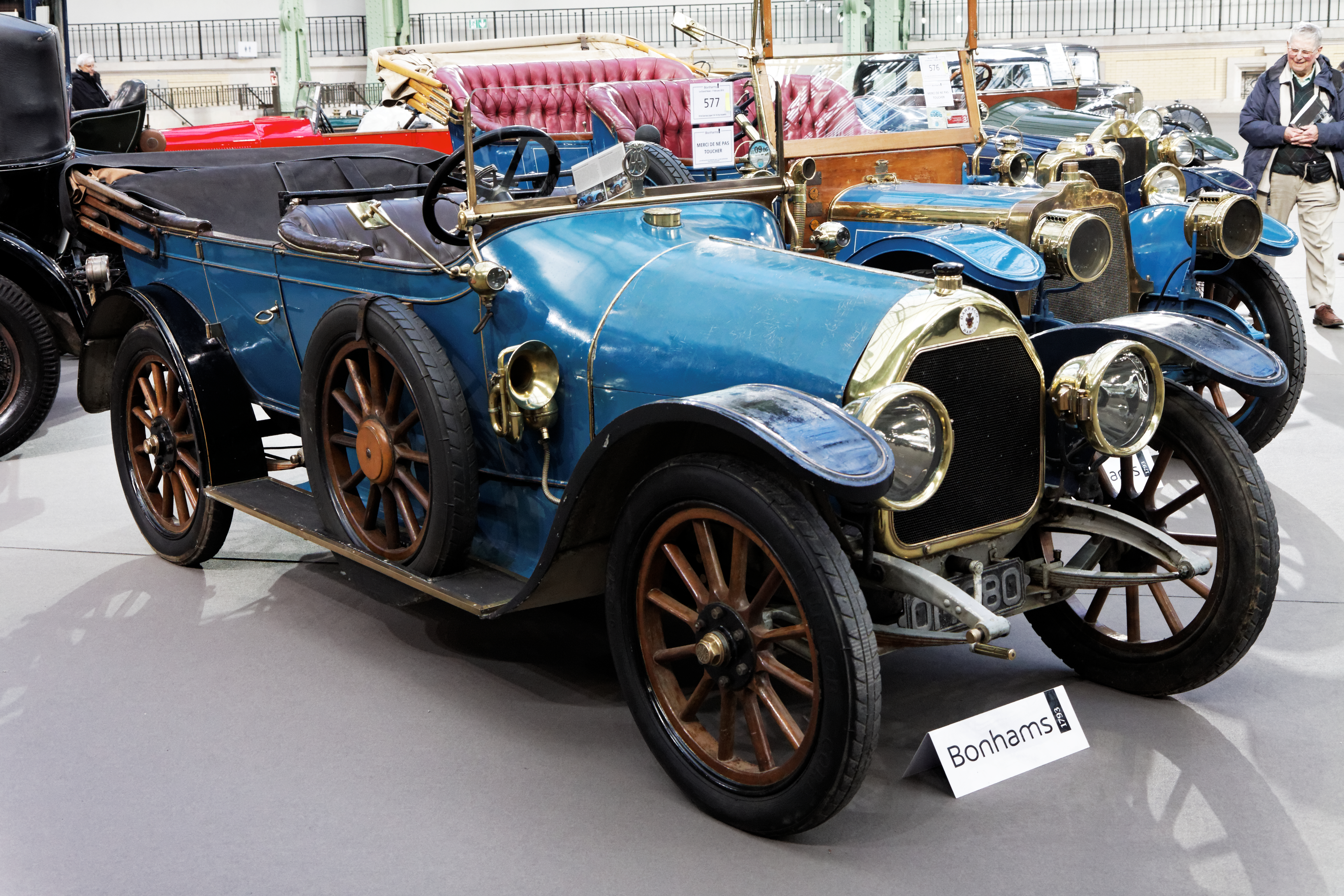
Darraq 16 horsepower type V14

By February 1913 shareholders had set up their own inquiry into the unsatisfactory position of their business and it reported poor co-operation between London and Suresnes, they had been pulling against each other, furthermore there had been considerable loss through "recent changes in personnel". The committee then went on record saying:

"M. Darracq, as a typical Frenchman, probably possessed far more originality and initiative than any Englishman of corresponding situation, but, if he displayed a failing, it was that he, like most of his brilliant race, lacked the Englishman's pertinacity, and, after a time, seemed to lose interest, as it were, in his original conceptions without making any serious effort to strike out a fresh line."

The chairman of the investigating committee, Norman Craig, was appointed chairman of A Darracq and Company (1905).

New works manager and designer of the proven Rover Twelve, appointed in October 1912, Owen Clegg, sensibly copied the Twelve for Darracq & Co's new model. Before his appointment as works manager Clegg had spent 12 months in USA at Darracq's expense studying automobile production. The factory at Suresnes was retooled for mass production, making it one of the first in the industry to do so. The 16HP Clegg-Darracq was joined by an equally reliable 2.1-litre 12HP car, and soon the factory was turning out sixty cars a week; by 1914, 12,000 men rolled out fourteen cars a day.

=== First World War ===
During the First World War, Darracq S.A. switched to the production of various war materials. The firm also returned to aircraft engine manufacturing as licensed builders of the Peugeot 8Aa and the Renault 12Fe.

During 1916, the Suresnes factory was transferred to Société Anonyme Darracq, a new company incorporated in France. British assets were also transferred to a company named Darracq Motor Engineering Company Limited. A. Darracq and Company (1905) Limited.

After the War, automobile production resumed as soon as the Suresnes factory had ceased making munitions, arms and planes. By the time of the Motor Show in October 1919, the prewar 16HP "Type V14" had returned to production, featuring a four-cylinder 2,940cc engine. But the manufacturer's big news at the Paris show was the 24HP "Type A", powered by a V8 4,584cc unit. This model, had also been initiated by Managing Director Owen Clegg back in 1913, but production had been delayed by intervening events until 1919. The "Type A" featured four forward speeds and, from 1920, four-wheel brakes. Despite these innovative features, it did not sell well.

The French franc had suffered a sustained crisis of its own during the war years, and in May 1920 the "Type V" was listed at 35,000 francs in bare chassis form: a torpedo bodied car was priced at 40,000 francs. The "Type V", with its 3,150 mm (124 in) wheelbase, was a substantial car for customers who wanted more. A "Type A" appeared on the same list at 39,500 francs in bare chassis form, and 44,500 francs for a torpedo bodied car.

After the war, the prewar 16HP V14 was the manufacturer's top-selling car in Britain.

== Automobiles Talbot ==
Following the inclusion of Clément-Talbot in the S T D Motors group, Suresnes products were branded Talbot-Darracq; the word Darracq was dropped in 1922, and this company was renamed Automobiles Talbot S.A.

Cars made by Automobiles Talbot were imported from France into England and renamed Darracq to avoid confusion with the English Clément-Talbot products.

== Motor sport ==
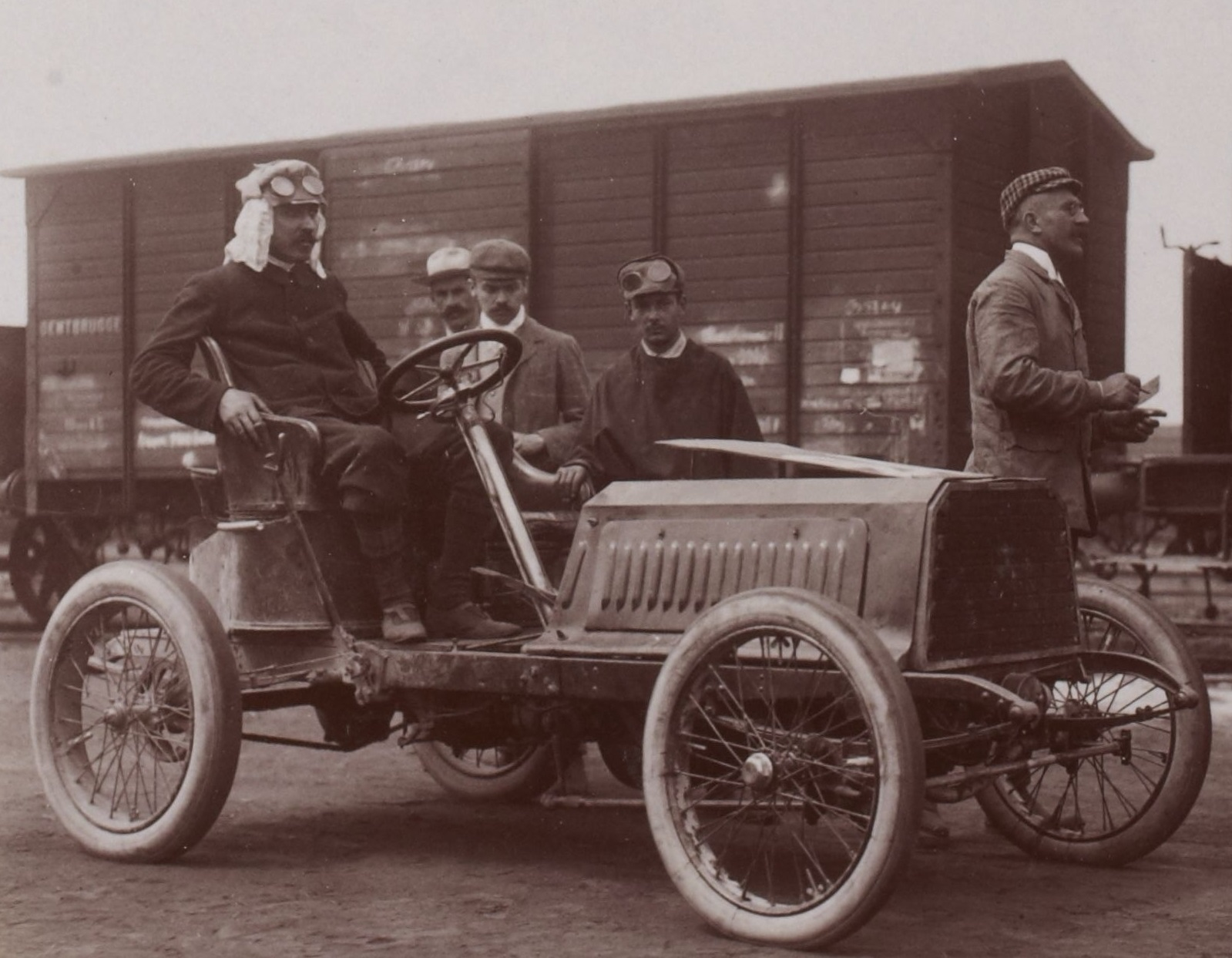
Captain H. Genty de la Touloubre, voiturettes class winner at the Circuit des Ardennes 1904 on his Darracq (gare de Bastogne, before departure).

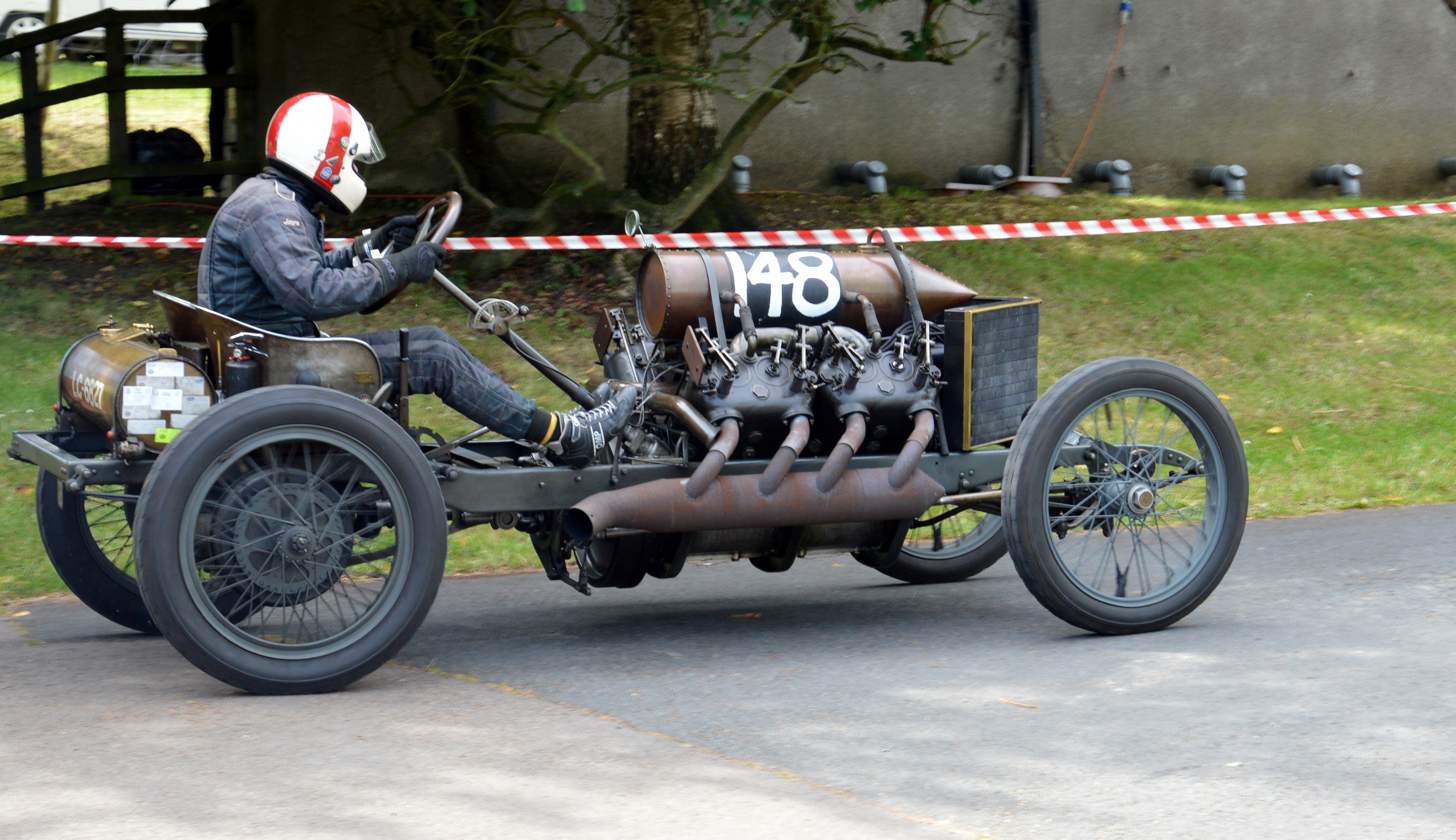
1905 Darracq 200hp V8 at the VSCC Prescott hill climb

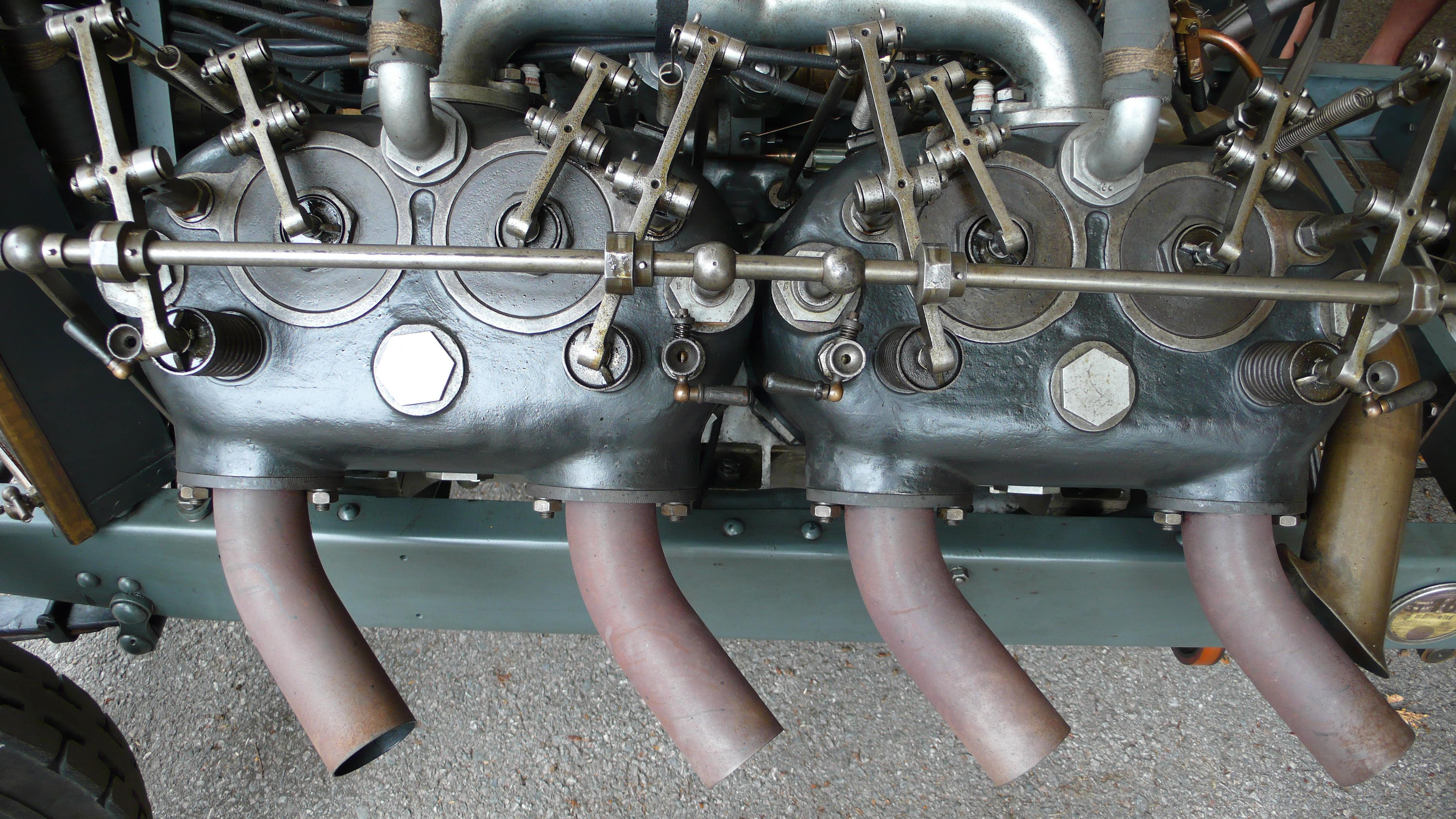
1905 25.5-litre Darracq 200hp V8

Like other automobile makers in this era, such as Napier, Bentley, and Daimler, Darracq & Co participated in motor racing, and there, the drastically stripped-down voitures legére garnered publicity. A 1904 effort to win the Gordon Bennett Trophy, however, was disastrous: despite entries of identical 11.3 L cars built in Germany, France, and Britain (per the Trophy rules), Darracq & Co scored no success. Paul Baras, drove a Darracq to a new land speed record of 104.53 mph (168.22 km/h) at Ostend, Belgium, on 13 November 1904. A 1905 racer was more promising. Fitted with a 22.5 L overhead valve V8 made from two Bennett Trophy engines mated to a single crankcase, producing 200 hp (150 kW; 200 PS), making it one of the first specialized land speed racers, and on 30 December 1905, Victor Hémery drove this car to a speed of 109.65 mph (176.46 km/h) in the flying kilometer at Arles, France. The V8 was shipped to Ormond Beach, Florida, (then host to numerous land speed record attempts), where it was timed at 122.45 mph (197.06 km/h) in 1906 to win the title "1906 King of Speed". This was not enough to hold the land speed record, however, which went to a Stanley, the Rocket, at 127.6 mph (205.35 km/h). On return, to Europe the car was sold to Algernon Lee Guinness who set many records over the next few years until the car was retired in 1909 with a broken piston. This V8 Special (see full story at ) was rebuilt in 2005 using its original engine which had survived. A video of the running engine was published on YouTube.

Darracqs won the 1905 and 1906 Vanderbilt Cup at Long Island, New York, both credited to Louis Wagner in a 100 hp (75 kW; 100 PS) 12.7 L racer. Darracq & Co also won the Cuban race at Havana.Though the 1906 Vanderbilt Cup was Darracq & Co's final racing victory, competition efforts did not stop entirely. In 1908, Darracqs came second, third, and seventh at the "Four Inch" Isle of Man Tourist Trophy, and in 1912, Malcolm Campbell entered a former works Darracq at Brooklands. After the Great War, as part of the STD combine, a Sunbeam Grand Prix re-badged as Talbot-Darracq participated in the 1921 French Grand Prix. The 'Invincible Talbot-Darracq' which were in effect smaller versions of the Grand Prix cars dominated voiturette racing at the highest levels for six years, winning every race they entered.

== Notes ==
=== Other sources ===
- Northey, Tom, "Land-speed record: The Fastest Men on Earth", in Northey, Tom, ed. World of Automobiles (London: Orbis, 1974), Volume 10, pp. 1161–1166. London: Orbis, 1974.
- Setright, L.J.K. "Opel: Simple Engineering and Commercial Courage", in Northey, Tom, ed. World of Automobiles, Volume 14, pp. 1583–1592. London: Orbis, 1974.
- Wise, David Burgess."Darracq: A Motor Enthusiast who Hated Driving", in Northey, Tom, ed. World of Automobiles, Volume 5, pp. 493–494. London: Orbis, 1974.
- Wise, David Burgess."Vanderbilt Cup: The American Marathon", in Northey, Tom, ed. World of Automobiles, Volume 21, pp. 2458–60-4. London: Orbis, 1974.
