= Paul Baras =

French cyclist and racing driver (1870–1941)

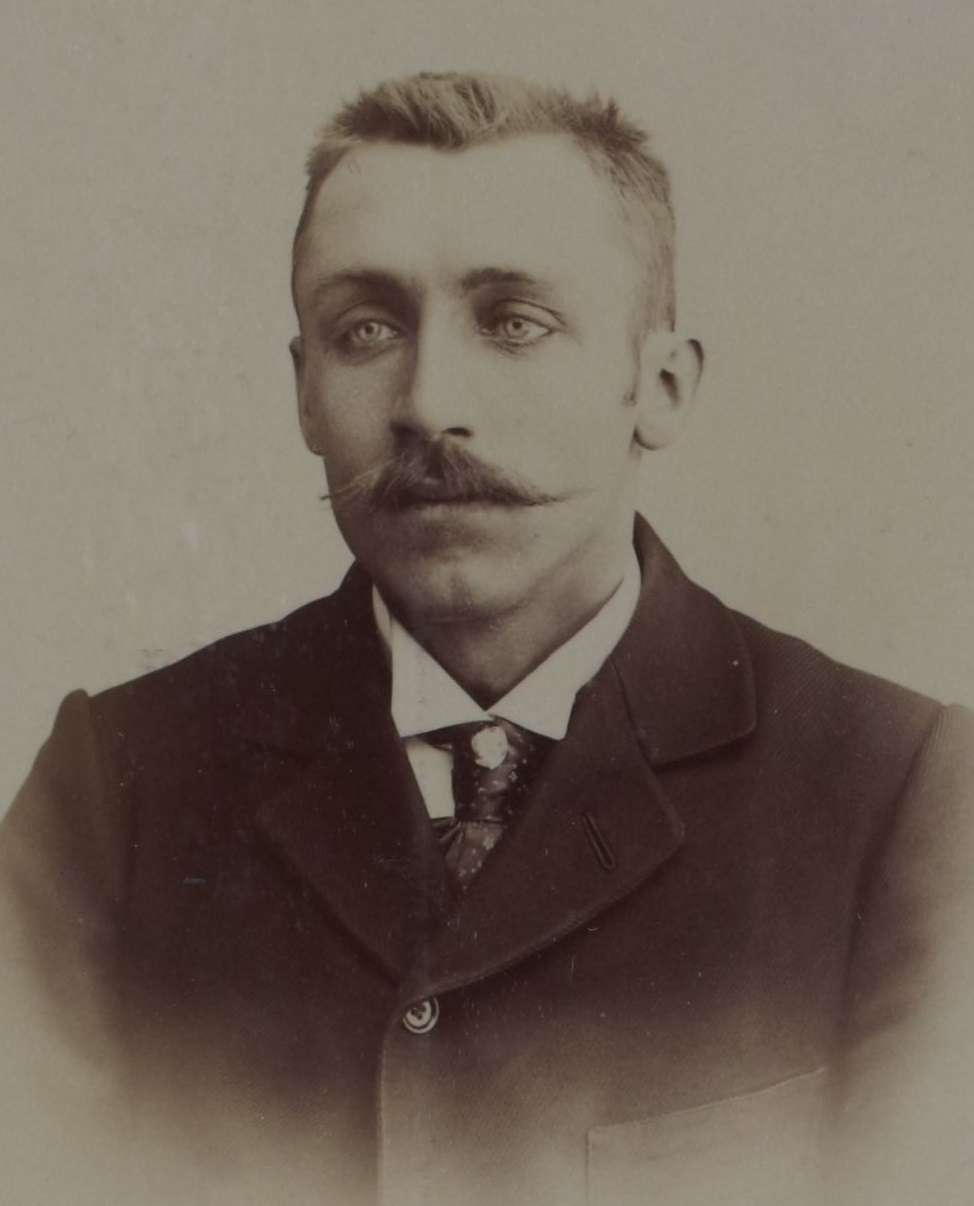
- Paul Baras, 1900.
- Born: May 14, 1870; Orchies, France
- Died: 10 June 1941 (aged 71); Saint-Maurice, France
- Occupations: racing driver, racing cyclist

Paul Baras (May 14, 1870 – November 6, 1941) was a road racing cyclist and racing driver from France. He competed in several early Grand Prix motor races, and held the world land speed record between November 1904 and January 1905.

== Career ==
Born in Orchies, France, Baras originally competed in cycling events including placing third in the 1894 Grand Prix de Paris Sprint. He switched to racing cars, initially in hill-climbs.

Baras set the world land speed record on November 13, 1904. Driving a Darracq 100 hp, he completed the flying kilometer in twenty-one and two-fifths of a second to give an average speed of 104.34 mph (167.92 km/h).

In 1906, he participated in the inaugural French Grand Prix, and led the early stages of the race. He eventually finished seventh, although he also had the fastest lap of the race. The following year, he finished third in the French Grand Prix. In 1908 he retired after three laps of the race.

== Gallery ==
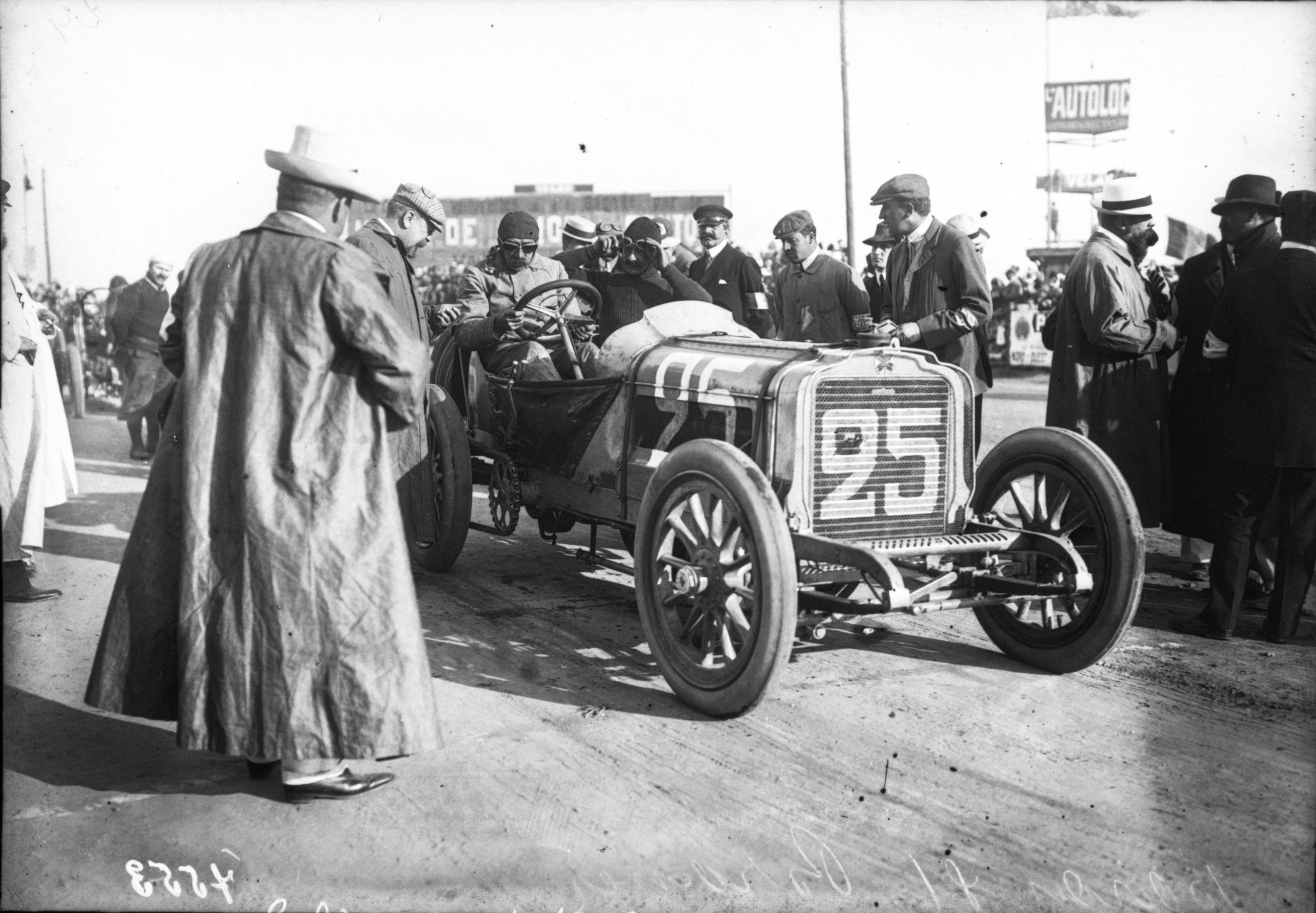
Baras at the 1908 French Grand Prix

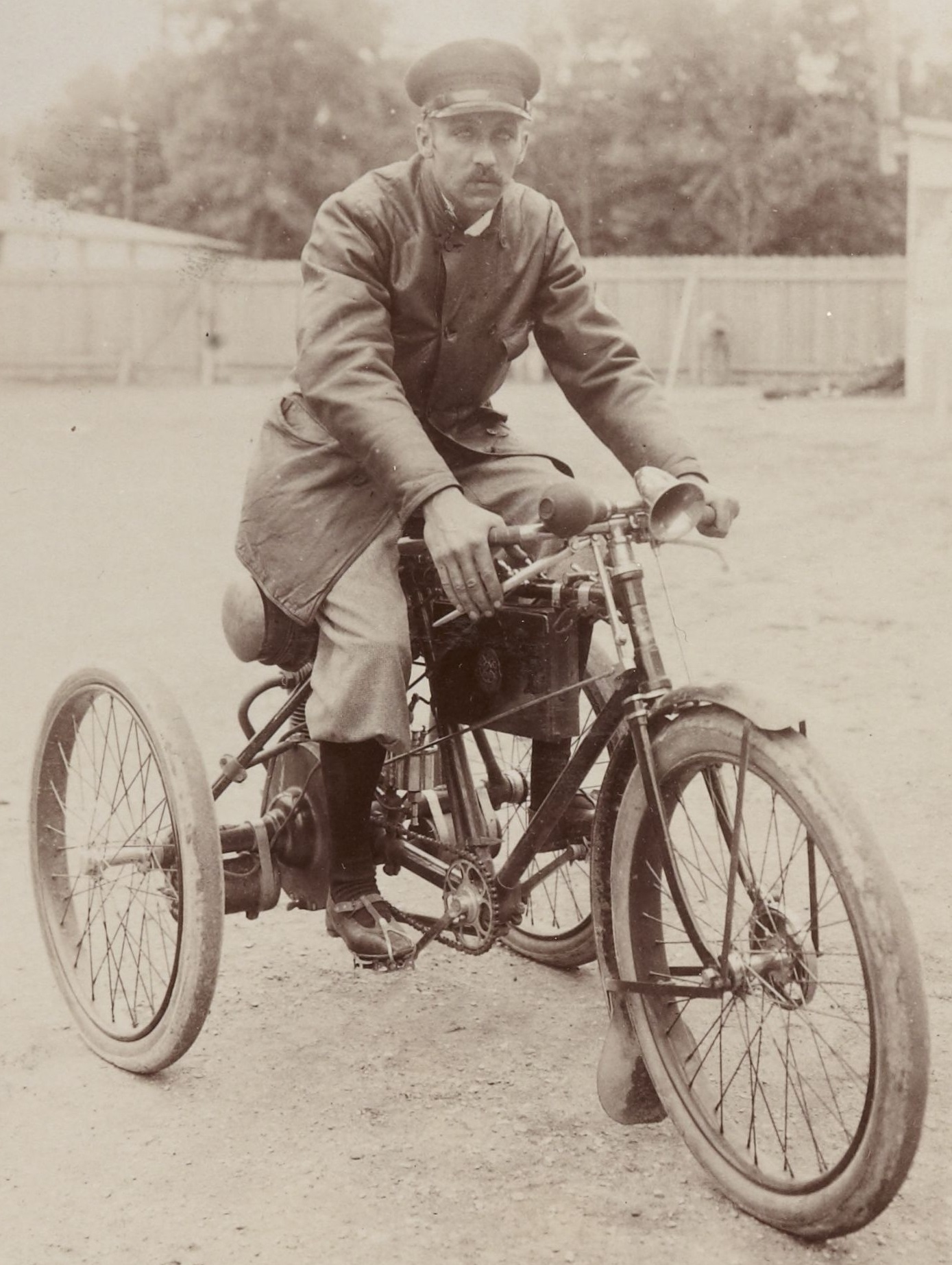
Baras in 1900.

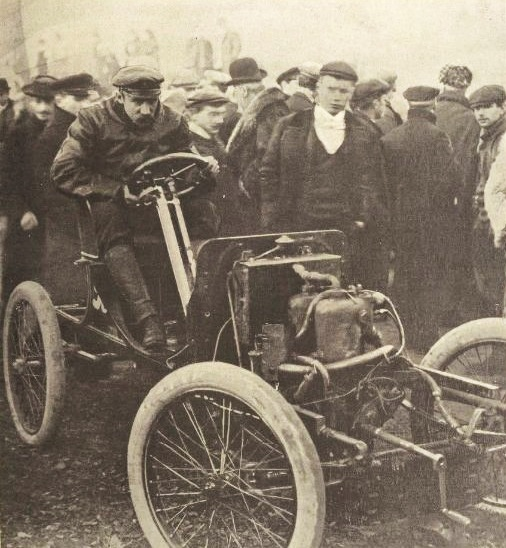
Gaillon 1901.

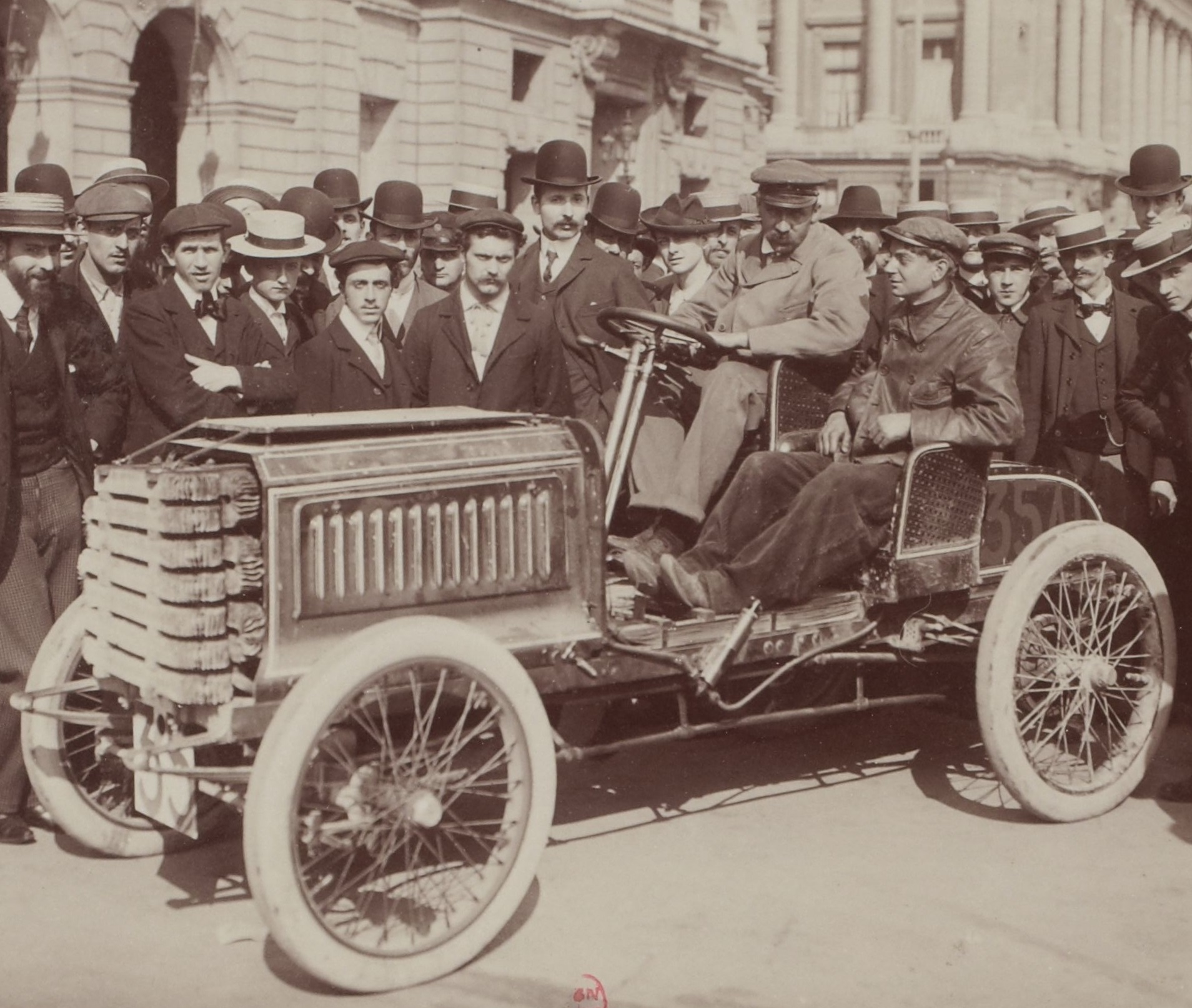
Paris-Vienne 1902.
