= 1907 Grand Prix season =

Second Grand Prix racing season

Seasons
- ← 1906 1908 →

The 1907 Grand Prix season was the second Grand Prix racing season. It saw a blossoming of circuit events, with the shift from the inter-city races. The popularity of the inaugural French Grand Prix and Targa Florio saw those events held again. The new Kaiserpreis was the first major motor-race held in Germany. This year also saw a number of voiturette races as the number of specialist small-engine cars grew which gave close, exciting racing very popular with spectators.

Felice Nazzaro, former chauffeur for Vincenzo Florio, won the Targa Florio, Kaiserpreis, and French Grand Prix driving for FIAT.[1] Along with victories by Alessandro Cagno (Itala) and Ferdinando Minoia (Isotta-Fraschini) at the Brescia races, these results marked an increase in competitive success for Italian constructors over their French counterparts, who had won the majority of events in the preceding decade.

This year also saw the opening of the first purpose-built racing circuit at Brooklands southwest of London, England on the estate of British entrepreneur Hugh F. Locke King.

== Major races ==
| Date | Name | Circuit | Race Regulations | Race Distance | Winning driver | Winning constructor | Report |
|---|---|---|---|---|---|---|---|
| 18 Apr | (Italy) I Coppa delle Vetturette | Madonie | Voiturette | 300 km (190 mi) | (France) Louis Naudin | Sizaire-Naudin | Report |
| 22 Apr | (Italy) II Targa Florio | Madonie | Targa Florio | 450 km (280 mi) | (Italy) Felice Nazzaro | Fiat | Report |
| 13–14 Jun | (Germany) I Kaiser Preis | Taunus | Kaiserpreis | 470 km (290 mi) | (Italy) Felice Nazzaro | Fiat | Report |
| 2 Jul | (France) II French Grand Prix | Dieppe | ACF Grand Prix | 760 km (470 mi) | (Italy) Felice Nazzaro | Fiat | Report |
| 2 Jul | (France) I Coupe de la Commission Sportive | Dieppe | ACF Grand Prix | 450 km (280 mi) | . de Langhe | Darracq | Report |
| 25 Jul | (Belgium) VI Ardennes Circuit | Bastogne | Kaiserpreis | 600 km (370 mi) | (United Kingdom) John Moore-Brabazon | Minerva | Report |
| 27 Jul | (Belgium) VI Ardennes Circuit | Bastogne | ACF Grand Prix | 600 km (370 mi) | (Belgium) Pierre de Caters | Mercedes | Report |
| 27 Jul | (Belgium) Liederkerke Cup | Bastogne | | 425 km (264 mi) | . Porlier | Minerva | Report |
| 13 Aug | (Italy) I Corsa Siciliano Vetturette | Palermo | Voiturette | 240 km (150 mi) | (Italy) Vincenzo Florio | De Dion-Bouton | Report |
| 1 Sep | (Italy) III Coppa Florio | Brescia | Kaiserpreis | 300 km (190 mi) | (Italy) Ferdinando Minoia | Isotta Fraschini | Report |
| 2 Sep | (Italy) I Coppa della Velocità | Brescia | ACF Grand Prix | 300 km (190 mi) | (Italy) Alessandro Cagno | Itala | Report |
| 10 Oct | (Italy) I Corsa Vetturette Madonie | Madonie | Voiturette | 300 km (190 mi) | Paolo Tasca | De Dion-Bouton | Report |
| 28 Oct | (France) II Coupe des Voiturettes | Rambouillet | Voiturette | 300 km (190 mi) | (France) Louis Naudin | Sizaire-Naudin | Report |

== Season review ==
The success of the first Targa Florio the previous year had been built up since, and 45 cars arrived in Sicily from Italy, France and Germany. Tens of thousands of spectators arrived for the race. In an exciting race, Louis Wagner in his Darracq pursued the FIATs and Italas. But when the Darracq broke its half-shaft on the rough mountain roads, the Italians took the victory. Felice Nazzaro (FIAT) won from his teammate, Vincenzo Lancia, with Maurice Fabry (Itala) in third and Arthur Duray (Lorraine de Dietrich) fourth.

The German Kaiserpreis Rennen was held on a 117 km circuit in the Taunus Mountains north of Frankfurt. It was part of the circuit used for the 1904 Gordon Bennett Cup. The ADAC regulations stipulated the race was cars of a maximum of 8-litres and 1165 kg in the hope of attracting cars which more closely resembled touring cars. Such was the interest, with 92 entries, that two 2-laps heats were held to get a final 20 qualifiers for the 4-lap final. FIAT dominated the race with Lancia winning the first heat and Nazzaro the second, before he went on to win the final.

Great Britain had a universal speed limit of 20 mph (32 km/h) on the open road and did not allow motor-racing on public roads, as on the continent (however these laws did not apply in Ireland or the Isle of Man). Therefore, constructed at his own expense, Hugh F. Locke King established the first purpose-built racetrack in the world at Brooklands on his estate in Surrey. A pear-shaped course, with banking at each end, it was 2.75 miles (4.43 km) long and 100 ft (30 m) wide. It opened on 28 June with Selwyn Edge setting a new 24-hour distance record of 1,581 miles (2,544 km). The first full race meeting was on 6 July with six races.

Although the inaugural Grand Prix had made an impact, it had not been a financial success for the Automobile Club de l'Ouest and they declined to host this year's event. Instead, it was held at Dieppe on the northern coast. The French Automobile Club (ACF) also modified the regulations and format. In an effort to limit the trend for ever-increasing engine size in pursuit of power, the ACF dictated a fuel-consumption formula allowing 30 litres per 100 kilometres (9.4 mpg_{‑imp}; 7.8 mpg_{‑US}). The race was 10 laps of a roughly triangular circuit from Dieppe to Eu, Londinières and back. Though initially of better quality roads, the surface soon broke up. Lancia had his Fiat run out of fuel on the last lap while in 3rd position. But once again it was Nazzaro who claimed the victory. His 16.3-litre FIAT completed the 770 km in 6 hours and 47 minutes, at an average speed of 114 km/h. The 1906-winner, Ferenc Szisz, in a 12.8-litre Renault was second. The Coup de la Commission Sportive was held at the same time as the Grand Prix, but over 6 laps rather than 10, starting three hours later, and with a slightly lower fuel allowance. This race was won by de Langhe in a Darracq.

The Belgian Automobile Club presented its Circuit des Ardennes weekend in three formats: there were only 6 entrants in the race run to the ACF rules (won by the Belgian Baron Pierre de Caters in a Mercedes). The alternative race, using the Kaiserpreis regulations had 23 starters. Belgian car-company Minerva scored a 1-2-3 finish, headed by the British Baron John Moore-Brabazon. Finally there was the Liederkerke Cup. This time Moore-Brabazon finished second behind Porlier also in a Minerva.

Similarly, the Italians ran the Coppa Florio to the two regulations. Ferdinando Minoia, in an Isotta Fraschini, won the third Coppa Florio, run to the Kaiserpreis rules, while the next day Alessandro Cagno in his 18-litre Itala won the ACF-based Coppa della Velocità di Brescia.

Meanwhile, in the United States, with ongoing issues with crowd-control the Vanderbilt Cup was not run this year.

There were still several inter-city races held: in June Arthur Duray in his Lorraine-Dietrich won the Moscow to St. Petersburg race in Russia. Perhaps the most epic though was the Peking to Paris race. Sponsored by French newspaper Le Matin, five cars started the 15000 km trial in June. The Italian Conde Scipione Borghese arrived in his Itala exactly two months later and two months ahead of the next finisher, a French De Dion-Bouton.
