= 1906 Grand Prix season =

First Grand Prix racing season

Seasons
- ← Pre-1906 1907 →

The 1906 Grand Prix season is regarded as the first Grand Prix racing season. It marked the advent of two iconic races: The French Grand Prix and the Targa Florio.

== Major races ==
Date	Name	Circuit	Race Distance	Winning driver	Winning constructor	Report
12 Feb	(Cuba) Cuban Race	Havana	351 km (218 mi)	(France) Victor Demogeot	(France) Renault	Report
6 May	(Italy) Targa Florio	Madonie	450 km (280 mi)	(Italy) Alessandro Cagno	(Italy) Itala	Report
26–27 Jun	(France) French Grand Prix	Le Mans	1,240 km (770 mi)	Ferenc Szisz	(France) Renault	Report
13 Aug	(Belgium) Circuit des Ardennes	Bastogne	602 km (374 mi)	(Belgium) Arthur Duray	(France) De Dietrich	Report
5 Sep	(Italy) Circuito Siciliano Vetturette	Palermo	246 km (153 mi)	(Italy) Vincenzo Florio	(France) De Dion-Bouton	Report
22 Sep	(United States) Vanderbilt Elimination Race	Long Island	285 mi (459 km)	(United States) Joe Tracy	(United States) Locomobile	Report
27 Sep	(United Kingdom) Tourist Trophy	Isle of Man	160 mi (260 km)	(United Kingdom) Charles Rolls	(United Kingdom) Rolls-Royce	Report
6 Oct	(United States) Vanderbilt Cup	Long Island	300 mi (480 km)	(France) Louis Wagner	(France) Darracq	Report
12 Nov	(France) Coupe de l'Auto	Rambouillet	233 km (145 mi)	(France) George Sizaire	(France) Sizaire-Naudin	Report

== Season review ==
The season started with the first ever motor-race in Cuba, won by Victor Demogeot in a 1904 80-bhp Renault.

To raise the profile of Italian motorsport, the wealthy 23-year old Conte Vincenzo Florio launched the Targa Florio, an open road race across the middle of his native Sicily. The circuit ran from Campofelice di Roccella on the northern coast up 3,600 feet (1,100 m) into the Madonie mountains to Petralia Sottana before returning to the coast. The roads at this time were unsealed and very rudimentary and windy. The race would be three laps of the 150 kilometres (93 mi) circuit. Florio went to great lengths to promote the event, commissioning a solid gold trophy and having an elaborate grandstand installed for VIPs at Petralia Sottana, overlooking the valleys.

Cars had to cost less than 20000 French francs (FF) and had to be one of at least ten built. They could have engines of any size, but had to be under 1300 kg in weight. There were ten entries in this first edition, including five Italas. Vincenzo Lancia, in the sole FIAT, took the lead initially before being forced to retire when a stone punctured his fuel tank. Itala team-mates Alessandro Cagno and Ettore Graziani then vied for the lead before the experience of Cagno showed through and he pulled away to win the inaugural Targa Florio. He had covered the 447 km in 9hrs 33 minutes, finishing 32 minutes ahead of Graziani.

The French Automobile Club (ACF) had grown more dissatisfied with the format of the inter-nation Gordon Bennett Cup. Each nation would enter a 3-car team for those races, but France had many more manufacturers than the other competing nations. In 1906, as current holders, it was the turn of the ACF to host the next Gordon Bennett race. Instead it proposed a new race with far larger Grand Prix ('Big Prize') of FF100,000 (equivalent to about €400,000 in 2015) to the winner, and open to all car-companies. Interest from manufacturers was high and in October 1905, promoted by the sports newspaper L'Auto, tenders were opened to the French auto clubs for hosting rights. The newly formed Automobile Club de la Sarthe, forerunner of the ACO, won the contract, starting construction on a 103 km triangular circuit to the east of Le Mans.

The inaugural French Grand Prix took place on the weekend of 26–27 June. Cars had a maximum weight of 1000 kg (excluding lights, wings and upholstery) and sufficient gasoline was allocated for a fuel consumption of 30 litres per 100 km. Run over the two days, the cars had to run six laps of the circuit each day, locked up overnight, for a total distance of 1240 km. Twelve manufacturers entered, most in 3-car teams, with nine from France, two from Italy (FIAT and Itala) and Mercedes from Germany. The fastest cars were the Brasier team, but at the end of the first day, it was the 13-litre Renault AK of Ferenc Szisz – a Hungarian émigré now resident in France – that led. He had taken 5 hours 45 minutes, at an average speed of 107 km/h. Second was Albert Clément in his Clément-Bayard ahead of Felice Nazzaro in the 16.2L FIAT. All three teams were greatly helped by the installation of the new Michelin detachable-wheel units that saved about ten minutes at each pit stop for changing tyres. Szisz carried on his advantage into the second day to win, taking a total of just over twelve hours to complete the 12 laps, at an average speed of just over 100 km/h. Nazzaro got up to finish second ahead of Clément. Over the course of the race, as the sun melted the newly-laid tar and the road-surface broke up, tyre changes were common. Szisz himself needed 19 tyre-changes during the course of the race – good pitwork had brought him victory. It established Renault and their car sales rose from 1600 in 1906 to 3000 in 1907 up to 4600 in 1908.

A large contingent of European drivers, including Nazzaro, Cagno and Louis Wagner, had entered the American Vanderbilt Cup race in October. In response, an elimination race was organised beforehand to select the five drivers to represent the US in the main race. A new circuit through New York city was set up, but yet again, crowd control was a constant problem with one spectator run over and killed when crossing the track during the race. The end of the race was signalled with a black and white chequered flag, marking the first instance that format was used. Frenchman Louis Wagner won in a Darracq, but yet again the crowd surge onto the track after the race endangered the remaining speeding cars.

The final new race of the year was also promoted by L'Auto. The Coupe de l'Auto was developed to promote engineering advances. Regulations dictated the size of single and two-cylinder Voiturette engines with a minimum weight of 700 kg. It was a true endurance race, with cars having to do eight laps of the 20-mile Rambouillet circuit, west of Paris, each day at an average speed of at least 30 miles per hour (48 km/h) for six days to qualify for the race itself on the 7th day. Georges Sizaire won in his own car – an 18 hp Sizaire-Naudin.

At the end of the year, Vincenzo Lancia founded his own car-company, while still staying on as a FIAT works-driver.

In 1906 Charles Jarrott, a British amateur racing driver, wrote the book "Ten Years of Motors and Motor Racing" about the years of open-road city-to-city racing. He noted then "The result is that only men who make it their business to drive these cars can hope to be successful... the curse of commercialism is the ruin of every sport".
