= 1908 Grand Prix season =

Third Grand Prix racing season

Seasons
- ← 1907 1909 →

The 1908 Grand Prix season was the third Grand Prix racing season. An international economic recession affected motor-racing with fewer races and smaller fields. However, in consequence, it also saw an increase in the number of smaller cars and voiturette racing. This gave close racing between the teams from Lion-Peugeot, Sizaire-Naudin and Delage. Both the major races in Europe, the Targa Florio and French Grand Prix, had precursor voiturette races, and along with the Coupe des Voiturettes, the honours were shared between those three manufacturers. This year’s Targa Florio had a small, but quality, field. Vincenzo Trucco won for Isotta-Fraschini with better mechanical reliability, after a close duel with the FIATs of Felice Nazzaro and Vincenzo Lancia.

The French Grand Prix had a big field and this time Christian Lautenschlager in a Mercedes again denied the French a victory in their own race. Felice Nazzaro won the Coppa Florio for FIAT

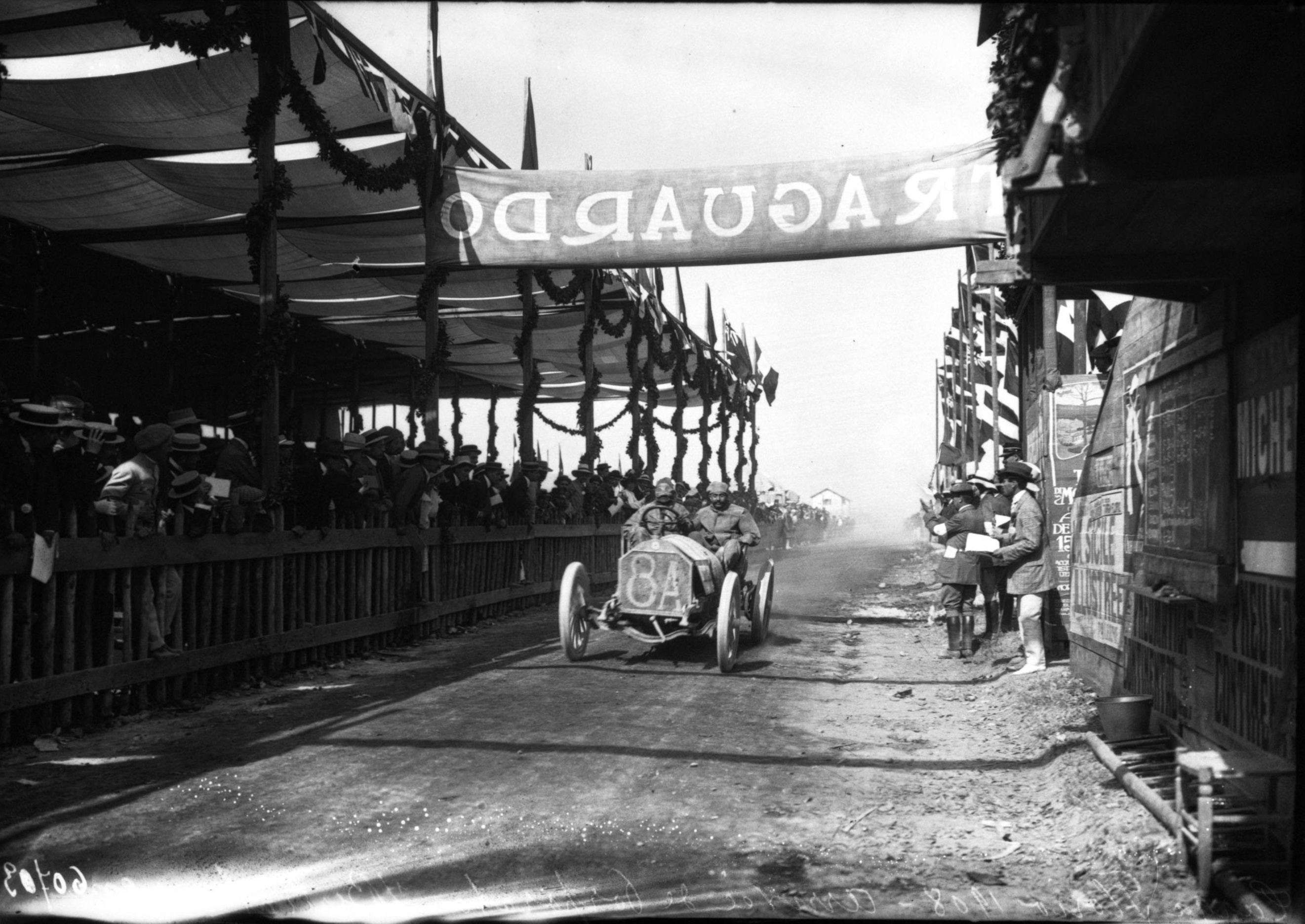
Jean Porporato at the 1908 Targa Florio

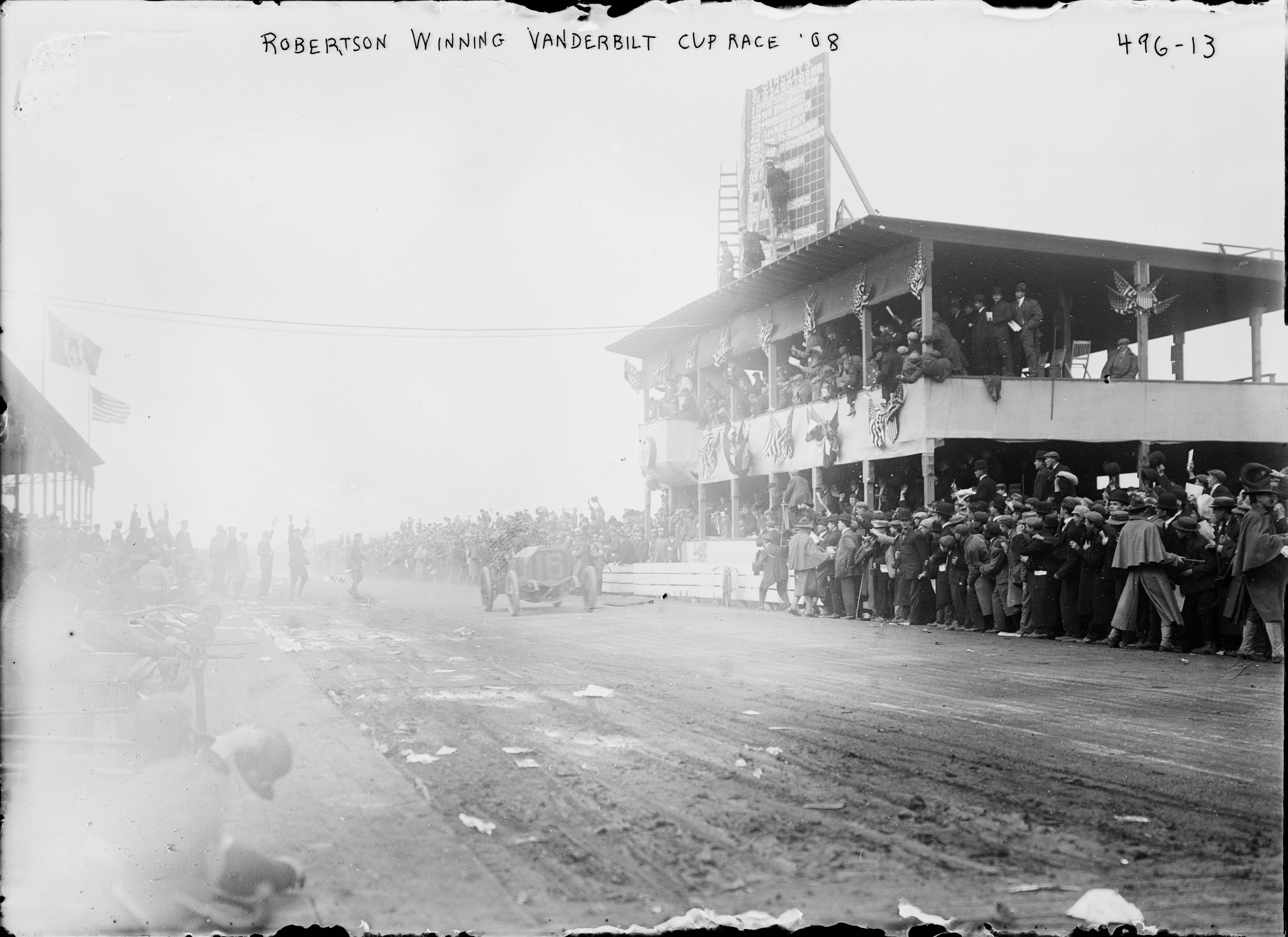
George Robertson winning the 1908 Vanderbilt Cup

== Major races ==
Date	Name	Circuit	Race Regulations	Race Distance	Winner’s Time	Winning driver	Winning constructor	Report
26 January	(Italy) I Corsa Vetturette Torino	Turin	Voiturette	180 km (110 mi)	4h 01m	(Italy) Giosue Giuppone	Lion-Peugeot	Report
10 May	(Italy) II Corsa Vetturette Madonie	Madonie	Voiturette	300 km (190 mi)	6h 32m	(Italy) Giosue Giuppone	Lion-Peugeot	Report
18 May	(Italy) III Targa Florio	Madonie	Targa Florio	445 km (277 mi)	7h 49m	(Italy) Vincenzo Trucco	Isotta Fraschini	Report
28 May	(Spain) I Copa Catalunya	Sitges	Voiturette	250 km (160 mi)	4h 23m	(Italy) Giosue Giuppone	Lion-Peugeot	Report
6 July	(France) I Grand Prix des Voiturettes	Dieppe	Voiturette	460 km (290 mi)	5h 46m	(France) Albert Guyot	Delage	Report
7 July	(France) XI French Grand Prix	Dieppe	AIACR	770 km (480 mi)	6h 56m	(Germany) Christian Lautenschlager	Mercedes	Report
15 August	(France) I Coupe de Normandie	Caen	Voiturette	350 km (220 mi)	2h 49m	(France) Marius Barriaux	Alcyon	Report
6 September	(Italy) IV Coppa Florio	Bologna	AIACR	530 km (330 mi)	4h 25m	(Italy) Felice Nazzaro	FIAT	Report
7 September	(Italy) I Targa Bologna	Bologna	Targa Florio	420 km (260 mi)	4h 01m	(France) Jean Porporato	Berliet	Report
24 September	(United Kingdom) International Four-Inch Race	Four Inch Course	RAC Four-Inch Formula	340 mi (550 km)	6h 43m	(United Kingdom) William Watson	Hutton-Napier	Report
27 September	(France) III Coupe des Voiturettes	Compiègne	Voiturette	400 km (250 mi)	5h 14m	(France) Louis Naudin	Sizaire-Naudin	Report
24 October	(United States) IV Vanderbilt Cup	Long Island Motor Parkway	AAA	260 mi (420 km)	4h 01m	(United States) George Robertson	Locomobile	Report
26 November	(United States) I American Grand Prize	Savannah	AIACR	400 mi (640 km)	6h 11m	(France) Louis Wagner	FIAT	Report

== Racing regulations ==
At the end of 1907, at a meeting in Ostend, the AIACR (forerunner of the FIA) had set down new regulations for motor-racing. In barely 10 years, top speeds had dramatically increased fourfold. More power had usually come from bigger and bigger engines – now approaching 20 litres, on chassis getting dangerously light and flimsy. So, the AIACR derived an international racing formula based on a maximum cylinder bore: 155mm for 4-cylinder engines and 127mm for 6-cylinders. A minimum weight of 1100kg (not including tyres, tools and liquids) was also applied to enforce structural integrity. They also opened the voiturette class up to 4-cylinder engines to further encourage development of smaller cars. For the voiturettes, the corresponding cylinder bore limitations were 65mm (4-cyl), 80mm (2-cyl) and 100mm (1-cyl) respectively.

== Season review ==
The Targa Florio opened the season with a small field of 9 entrants. In a close race across the rough Sicilian roads, the FIATs of Nazzaro and Lancia led initially, but when they had to stop at the pits it was Vincenzo Trucco close behind who took the lead. He held it to the finish to give Isotta-Fraschini its first major victory.

The French Grand Prix was once again held on the 77km circuit on the northern French coast at Dieppe. Although this was only the third annual Grand Prix, the organising body, the ACF, numbered it the 11th French Grand Prix – by retroactively including the earlier inter-city races to add more faux-prestige. The track was well-provided for. Teams had service places built in a divided trench, from whence, subsequently, came the term “pits”. A big field of 48 cars arrived, of which half were French manufacturers. Challenging the established Renault, Richard-Brasier, Clément-Bayard and Mors were FIAT and Itala from Italy, and Benz, Mercedes and Opel from Germany. Otto Salzer, in his Mercedes, led the first lap. Then as he fell back with engine issues it was Nazzaro and Wagner (FIATs), Lautenschlager (Mercedes) and Hémery (Benz) who diced for the lead. The French cars dropped out with mechanical problems, as did the FIATs. Hémery was caught by a stone thrown up that smashed his goggles and put glass splinters in his eye. Despite the injury, he pressed on, closing in on the Mercedes. Even though Lautenschlager had to ease off to save his tyres he took the victory from Hémery, with René Hanriot third in another Benz. The partisan French crowd was left very disgruntled.

The day before, a huge field of 64 mostly French cars had entered for the inaugural Grand Prix des Voiturettes. Albert Guyot had enough fuel in his Delage to run the near 6-hour race without stopping. So when the leading pair of Sizaire-Naudins had to pit he could carry on to a comfortable 16-minute victory. Naudin was second followed by the Lion-Peugeots of Jules Goux and Georges Boillot. Later in the year, at the Coupe des Voiturettes run at Compiègne, the Sizaire-Naudins had bigger fuel-tanks so now they could also run non-stop. Naudin won ahead of his co-owner Sizaire, with Goux coming third.

A major meeting was held in on a high speed circuit in Bologna consisting of two races over two days, around two months after the French Grand Prix. The first was the Coppa Florio over 10 laps, and was this year held for Grand Prix cars, with every car having appeared at the Grand Prix. Notable was the absence of the German entries. Ferdinando Minoia lead the first lap in a Lorraine-Dietrich but then ran into trouble on the second, giving the lead to Vincenzo Lancia in a FIAT, but he would lose time around the halfway mark, eventually finishing fifth, with fellow FIAT driver Nazzaro taking the lead and holding it to the end. On the following day was the Targa Bologna over 8 laps, for Targa Florio cars. It attracted mostly Italian drivers. Nino Franchini (in a Bianchi) lead the first few two laps but retired on his third, with second placed Enrico Maggioni (in a Zust) heavily delayed on his third lap, giving the lead to Jean Porporato in his Berliet who drove steadily to win. Both races had high attrition and many drivers experienced delays, mostly due to tyre trouble on the high speed circuit.

In the United States, there had been a schism between the Automobile Association of America (AAA) and the Automobile Club of America (ACA). The former ran the Vanderbilt Cup races, but these had been plagued by poor crowd control, and the 1907 race had been cancelled accordingly. It was reinstated in 1908 to the AAA’s own rules. This upset the European teams, who boycotted the race, and so the ACA took the opportunity to launch their own race: the American Grand Prize run to the AIACR regulations and held on Thanksgiving Day, a month after the Vanderbilt Cup.

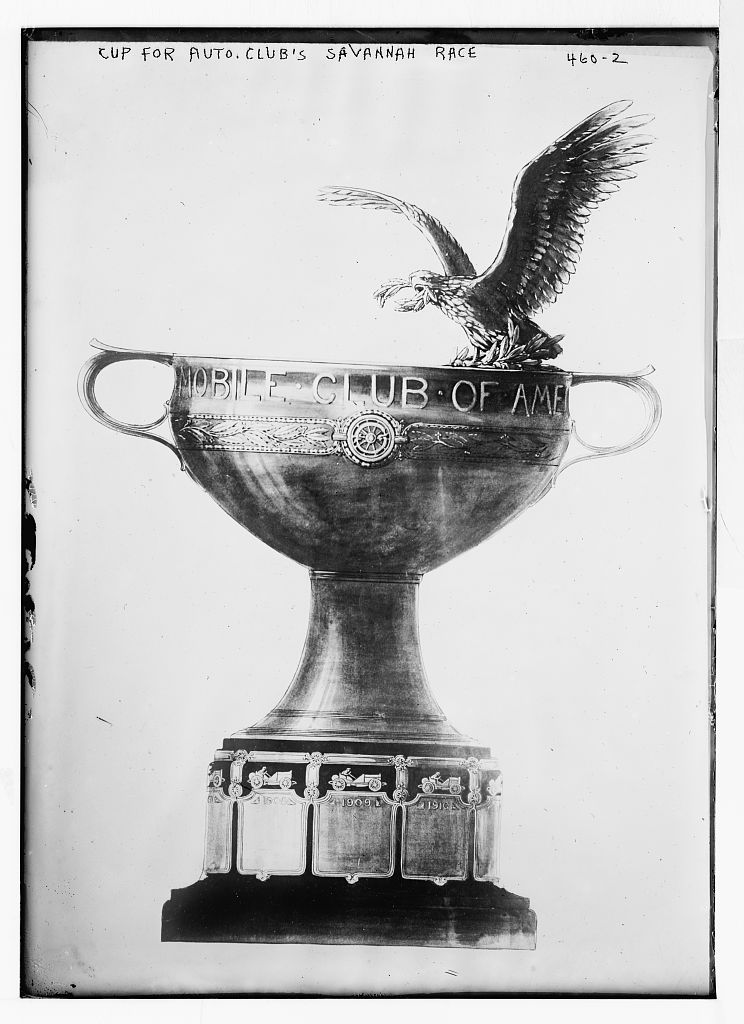
American Grand Prize trophy

The race was held on a 25-mile course outside of Savannah, Georgia. The roads were in good condition and on race-day were lined with armed police and soldiers to maintain crowd control. The twenty entrants included the best European drivers. FIAT had Nazzaro and Wagner, with a third car for Italian-American Ralph DePalma. Hémery and Hanriot were sent by Benz, as was Ferenc Szisz (Renault), Arthur Duray (Lorraine-Dietrich) and Alessandro Cagno (Itala). DePalma thrilled the local crowd by taking the initial lead. The French and American cars lost ground leaving it to be a contest between FIAT and Benz. Hémery crossed the line first but it was Wagner who won by a minute on corrected time.

After the American Grand Prize, Henry Ford (on the ACA committee) declared that American manufacturers could not compete with European cars unless they also started building specialist racing cars. However, he could not do so himself, as he had just started tooling up for mass-production of the Model T.

Although French cars dominated voiturette racing, they did not win a single race in the larger grade this year. With the economic downturn and seeing the writing on the wall, Renault had decided to quit motor-racing. At the end of the year, a dozen other French and German manufacturers followed, in a letter pledging to abstain from motor-racing for the next three years because of the rising costs. It was enforced with a FF100,000 (equivalent to approximately €468,000 in 2025) bond on each, forfeited for those that broke the agreement. So, at the start of 1909, with only nine entrants the ACF was forced to cancel the Grand Prix.

=== Other events ===
Following its sponsorship of the great race from Peking to Paris in 1907, this year French newspaper Le Matin organised an even longer one from New York to Paris – travelling across the United States to Alaska before getting a boat to Japan, and Vladivostok. Six cars started in Times Square on February 12. After much controversy, the American team in a Thomas Flyer was declared the winner.
