= Gobron-Brillié =

Defunct French automobile manufacturer (1898–1930) and car model

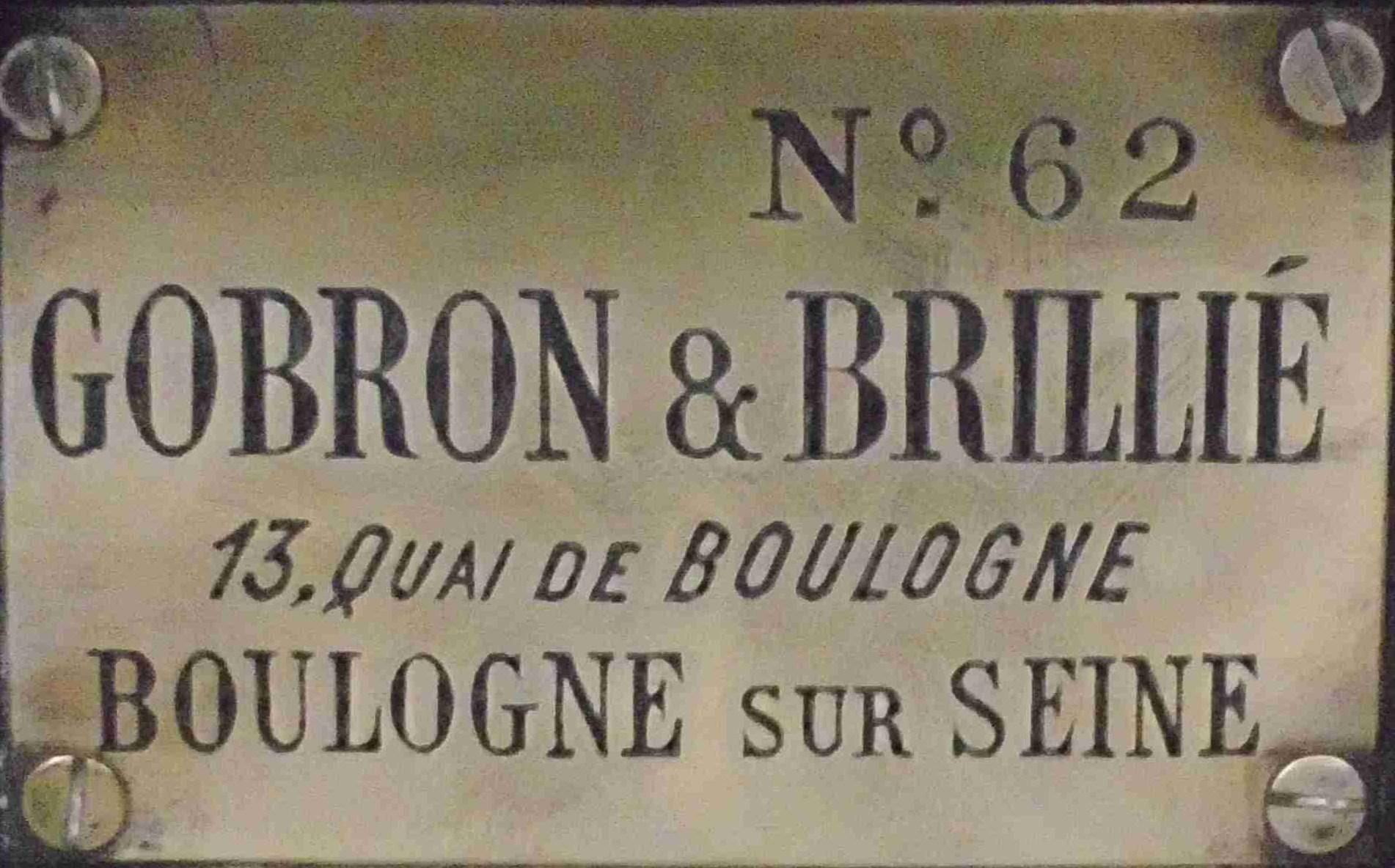
Gobron-Brillié Emblem

Gobron-Brillié was an early French automobile manufactured from 1898 to 1930. The original company, Societé des Moteurs Gobron-Brillié, was founded by the French engineer, Eugène Brillié, and industrialist, Gustave Gobron, at 13, quai de Boulogne, Boulogne-sur-Seine, near Paris, in 1898.

== History ==
=== Before 1898 ===
Eugène Brillié studied at the École centrale des arts et manufactures, and then went on to work, from 1887 to 1898, at the Compagnie des chemins de fer de l'Ouest. Meanwhile, Gustave Gobron (15 June 1846 to 27 September 1911) started as director of Godillot, a supply company to the military, but took up politics, and was elected to the National Assembly, from 1885 to 1889, at which point he created a car manufacturing company, under his own name. The two men went into partnership, creating the Société des Moteurs Gobron-Brillié.

=== 1898–1903 ===
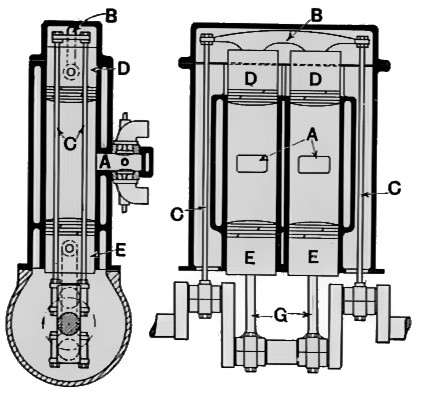
Gobron-Brillié opposed-piston engine, with overhung yoke

Brillié had developed an unusual type of internal-combustion engine, with two opposed pistons within each cylinder. The compression stroke involved the two pistons approaching each other, and then the ignition was subsequently triggered between them. The inlet and exhaust valves were also placed at this point of closest-approach between the pistons.

Mounted vertically, the lower piston in each cylinder was connected by a conventional connecting rod to the crankshaft, while the upper pistons were connected to an overhung yoke, with two long connecting rods back down to the crankshaft, one on each side.

Instead of a carburettor, a revolving petrol distributor was developed, with the quantity of fuel being regulated by a drip-feed. One advantage of this device was that a wide variety of fuels could be used.

The engine was mounted at the rear, on a triangulated tubular chassis, with chain-drive to the wheels.

By 1899 they were registered at 17 rue Philippe de Girard, Paris.

By 1900, the company was producing about 150 cars per year. The cars were also built, under licence, in France as La Nanceene, and in Belgium as the Gobron-Nagant, and Botwoods of Ipswich sold them in England as Teras.

=== 1904–14 ===
When Brillié left the company, at the end of 1903, the design was changed to use a more conventional pressed-steel ladder-frame chassis, the engine was moved to the front, and the fuel-distributor was replaced by a carburettor, but they still kept the opposed-piston engine design.

Around 1906–1908, models included:

- four-cylinder 24/35 hp
- four-cylinder 7·6-litre 40/60 hp
- six-cylinder 60/75 hp 11.4-litre

The last of the giant models was produced in 1910. In 1909/1910, an 8-cylinder X-form engine was made for aircraft.

A 1907 Gobron-Brillié fire engine can be seen on display in the National Motor Museum, Beaulieu in England.

=== 1918–22 ===
After the First World War, the company changed name to Automobiles Gobron, and moved to new premises at Levallois-Perret. The design continued to use opposed-piston engines, until 1922 (a 25 hp model).

=== 1922–30 ===
In 1922, the design was changed to using a more conventional 1.5-litre Chapuis-Dornier engine, and was additionally marketed under the name of Stabilia, but it sold badly. By 1927, the company was producing about 250 vehicles a year, but by 1930 it was down to two, and the company was forced to file for bankruptcy.

=== Brillié's activity, after 1903 ===
Brillié had left the company at the end of 1903, to join the Ateliers Schneider at Le Havre (formerly the Ateliers d’artillerie des Forges et Chantiers de la Méditerranée, which had been bought by Schneider in 1897). There, he built touring cars and commercial vehicles of more conventional design.

Schneider progressively took more control of the company, and abandoned the fabrication touring cars, preferring to develop the utility vehicles market. In 1906, the Brillié company delivered its first Paris buses. The installations at Le Havre were not well adapted, and the works were moved to other factories in Chalon and Champagne-sur-Seine. In March 1914, Schneider took his automobile activity to the Société d’outillage mécanique et d’usinage d’artillerie.

During the First World War, in December 1915, a meeting between Colonel Estienne and Brillié took place to elaborate a tank project. At the start of January 1916, Joffre gave the go-ahead for the project and, on 31 January, put in for a purchase of 400 of what he called terrestrial battleships, armed with a 75 mm cannon . This was the first French tank, the Schneider CA1.

== Picture gallery ==
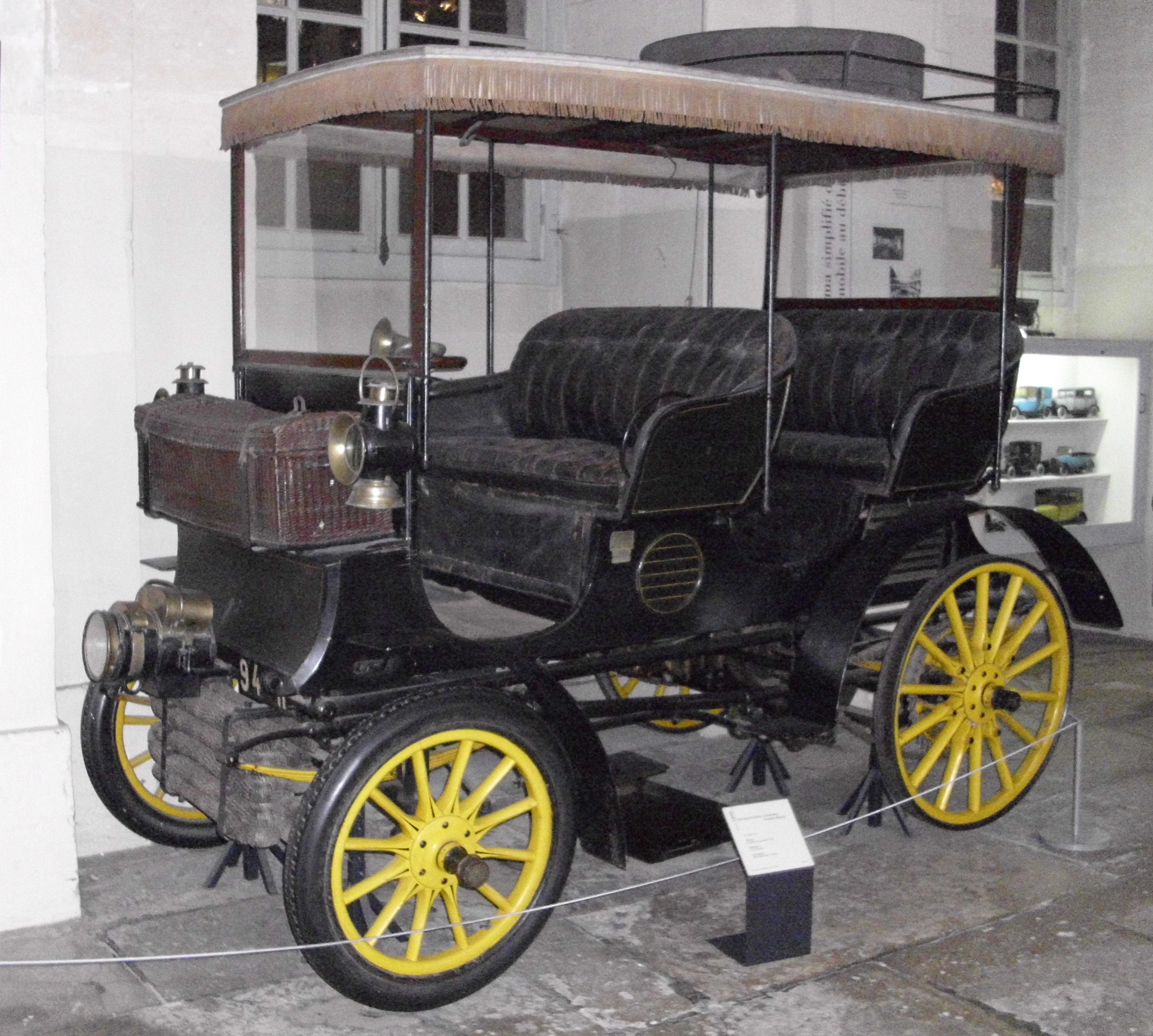
Gobron-Brillié 1898

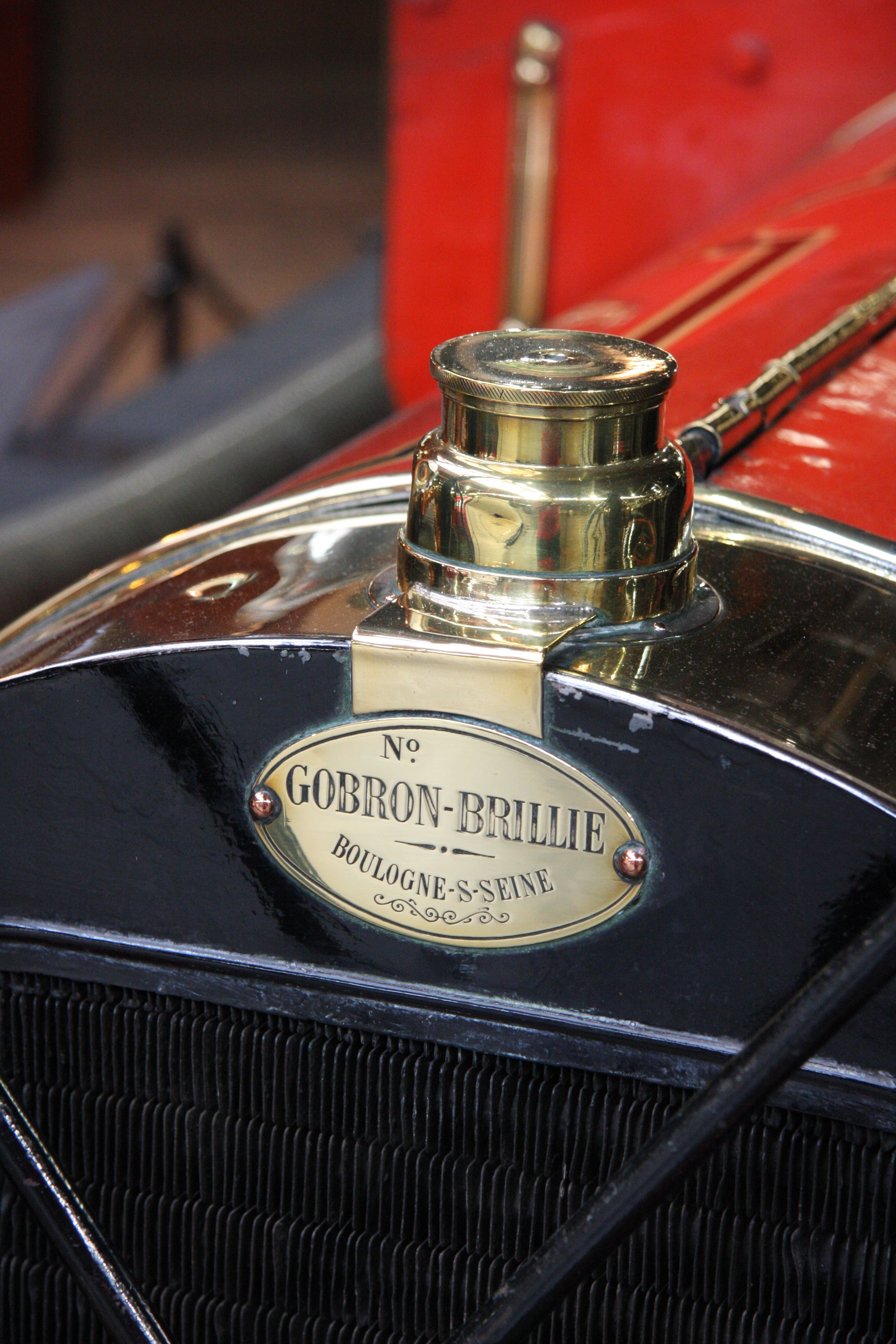
Gobron-Brillié motif

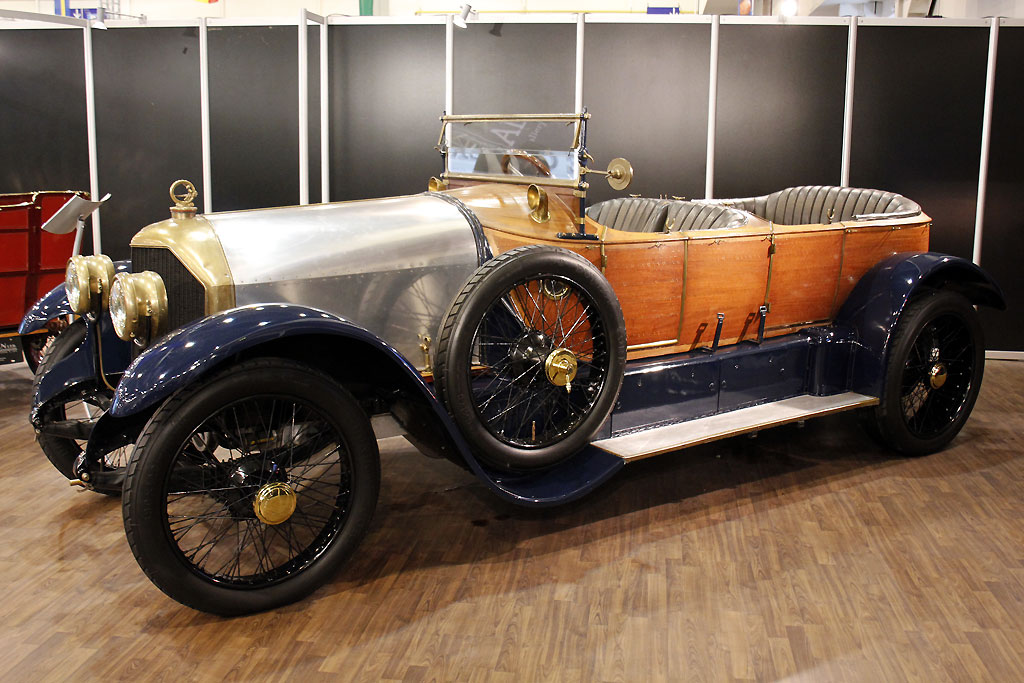
1912 Gobron-Brillié with a skiff body by Rothschild

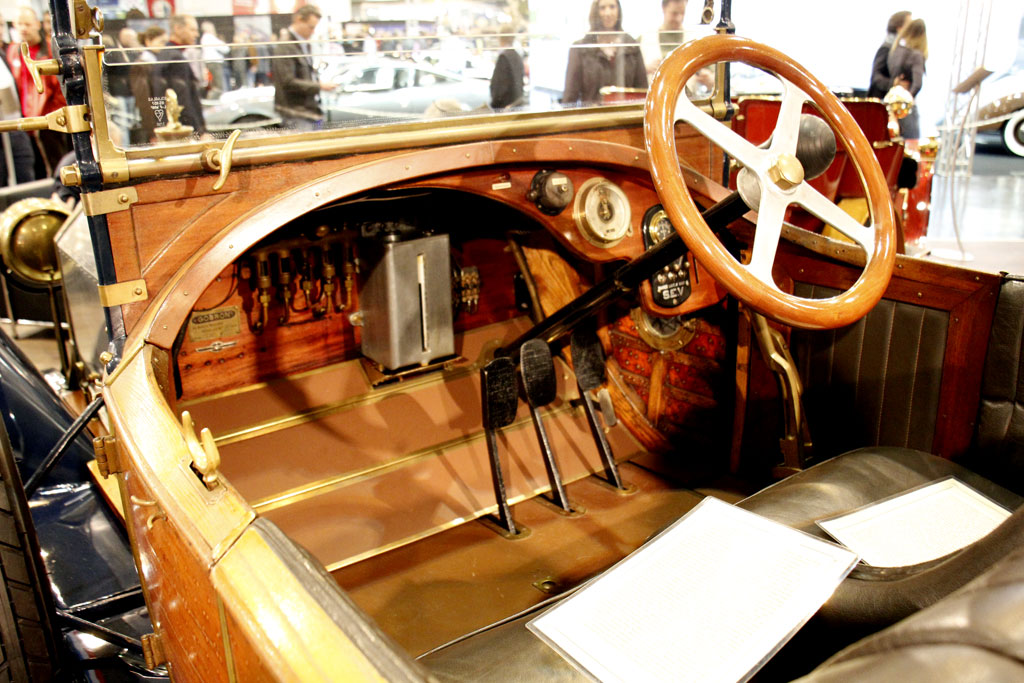
1912 Gobron-Brillié interior

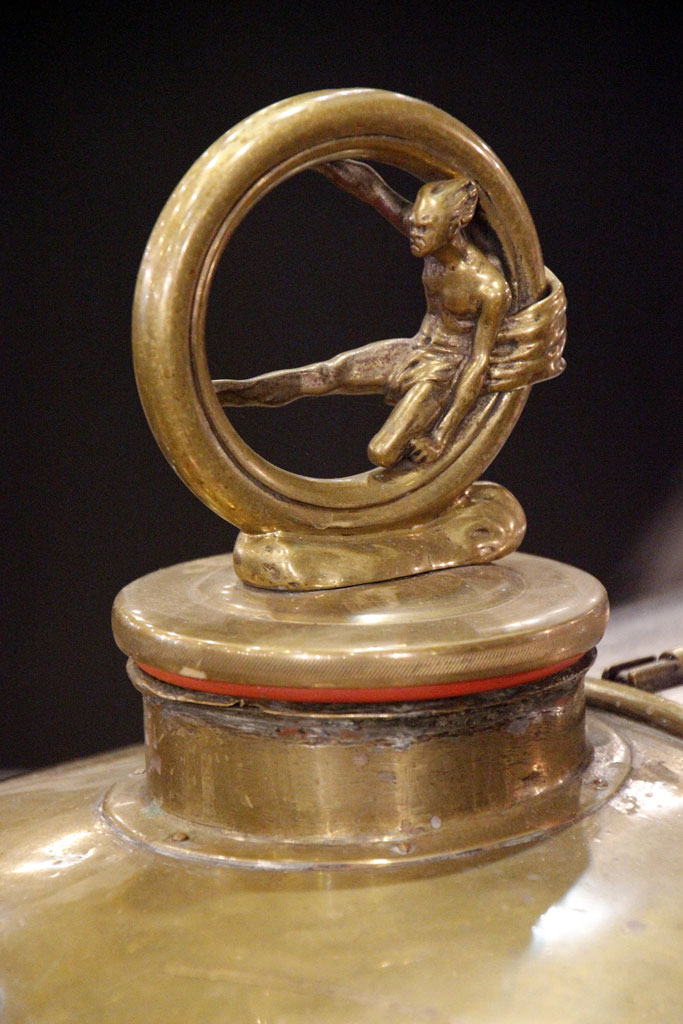
1912 Gobron-Brillié mascot

== Races and records ==
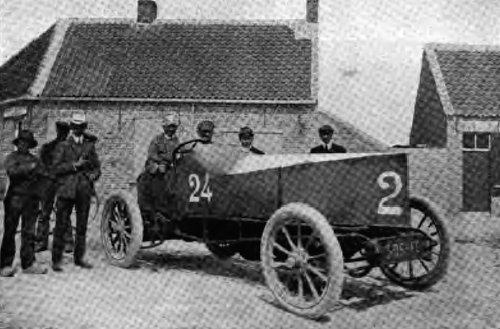
Louis Rigolly in his car which first exceeded 100 mph in 1904

- 1901 Paris-Berlin race: several Gobron-Brilliés and Nanceenes took part
- 1901 Circuit du Nord, alcohol-fuel race: Louis Rigolly took third place in a Gobron-Brillié
- 1902 Château-Thierry hill climb: Rigolly won his class
- 1902 Circuit des Ardennes, alcohol-fuel race: Rigolly in a Gobron-Brillié
- 1903 Paris–Madrid race: a team of three cars, driven by Rigolly, Arthur Duray and Koechlin. They each had a 13.5-litre four-cylinder model. They did not do particularly well in the race itself, but won many of the prizes for the subsequent speed hill-climbs and sprints
- 1903 Gordon Bennett Cup, Castlewellan hill-climb, Ostend speed meeting, Grenoble, Laffrey, and Château-Thierry: a number of victories
- 1903 Dourdan: Duray won, with a speed of 136 km/h
- 1904 (March): Rigolly and Duray were the first men to exceed 150 km/h
- 1904 (17 July) Ostende Automobile Week: Rigolly, in a 15-litre four-cylinder Gobron-Brillié, became the first to exceed 100 mph (160 km/h), averaging 103.56 mph over a kilometre.
- 1906 French Grand Prix: Gobron-Brillié was one of the ten French manufacturers that were entered
- 1907 Targa Florio, 1907 Kaiser Preis and 1907 French Grand Prix: Gobron-Brilliés took part
- Gobron-Brillié was excluded from the 1908 French Grand Prix in what was effectively the start of formula racing to control the sport in general, and engine size in particular.
- 1930 Six Hours of Burgundy race: 1·5-litre sports car, designed and driven by Chabreiron, won the 1500cc class
- 1930 Circuit des Routes Paoees: won the 1500cc class
