= Louis Rigolly =

French racing driver and first person to drive a car over 100 mph (1876–1958)

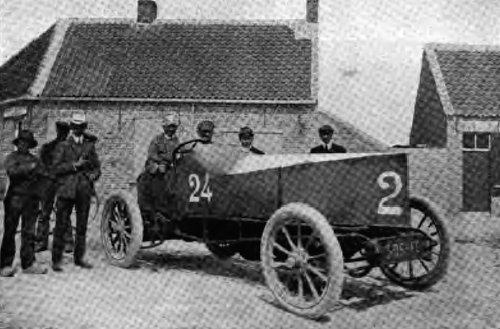
Louis Rigolly in his car which first exceeded 100 mph in 1904

Louis Rigolly (1876–1958), a Frenchman, was the first man to drive a car at over 100 miles per hour (160 km/h).

He set a record of 103.561 mph (166.665 km/h) on a beach at Ostend in Belgium on 21 July 1904, driving a 13.5 litre Gobron-Brillié racing car. He covered a 1 kilometre course in 21.6 seconds, beating Belgian Pierre de Caters mark of 97.25 mph (156.51 km/h), set the previous May over the same 1 kilometre course in Ostend. The record stood for just three months. Rigolly also participated in early Grand Prix motor racing, winning the Light car class of the inaugural Circuit des Ardennes in 1902, driving a Gobron-Brillié.

== See also ==
- Land speed record
