= Circuit des Ardennes (motor racing) =

The Circuit des Ardennes was an auto race held annually at the Circuit de Bastogne, Bastogne, from 1902 to 1907. It was the first major race to run on a closed course instead of from one city to another. The name was later used for a rally, part of the Dutch as well as the Belgian national rally championships.

The first race, held in 1902, was organised by Baron Pierre de Crawhez, and was run over 6 laps of the circuit, with cars divided into three classes which ran simultaneously. The Heavy car class was won by Charles Jarrott in one of several Panhard 70s entered in the race, with victory in the Light car going to Louis Rigolly in a Gobron-Brillié, and in the Voiturette class to Jean-Marie Corre in a Corre.

After the success in 1902, the race was run again in 1903 but with three separate races for the different classes. The Heavy car class ran on the morning of 22 June, with the Light car class in the afternoon, and the Voiturettes the following day on a separate circuit based around Arlon.

For 1904, the Heavy and Light car classes were combined again, with the Light car class fading, with just a single entry in 1905 and none in 1906. The Circuit des Ardennes des Voiturettes race was repeated in 1904 and 1905, this time the day before the main race and on the same circuit, but entries also waned with just three starting the race in 1905.

For the final year of the Circuit des Ardennes two races were again held. The first was for cars complying with the regulations of the Kaiserpreis, and the second, two days later, was for Grand Prix cars.

== Winners of the Circuit des Ardennes ==
| Year | Formula | Driver | Constructor | Report |
|---|---|---|---|---|
| 1902 | | (United Kingdom) Charles Jarrott | Panhard 70 | Report |
| 1903 | Heavy car | (Belgium) Pierre de Crawhez | Panhard 70 | Report |
| 1903 | Light car | (France) Paul Baras | Darracq 24hp | Report |
| 1903 | Voiturette | (France) Louis Wagner | Darracq | Report |
| 1904 | Voiturette | (France) Albert Clément | Clément | Report |
| 1904 | Heavy car | (United States) George Heath | Panhard 70 | Report |
| 1905 | Voiturette | (France) Louis Wagner | Darracq 20hp | Report |
| 1905 | Heavy car | (France) Victor Hémery | Darracq | Report |
| 1906 | Grand Prix | (Belgium) Arthur Duray | Lorraine-Dietrich | Report |
| 1907 | Kaiserpreis | (United Kingdom) John Moore-Brabazon | Minerva | Report |
| 1907 | Grand Prix | (Belgium) Pierre de Caters | Mercedes-Benz | Report |
