= Circuit des Ardennes =

Circuit des Ardennes may refer to:

- Circuit des Ardennes (cycling), a cycling stage race held in France
- Circuit des Ardennes (motor racing), an annual motor race held between 1902 and 1907 in Belgium
