= Renault AK 90CV =

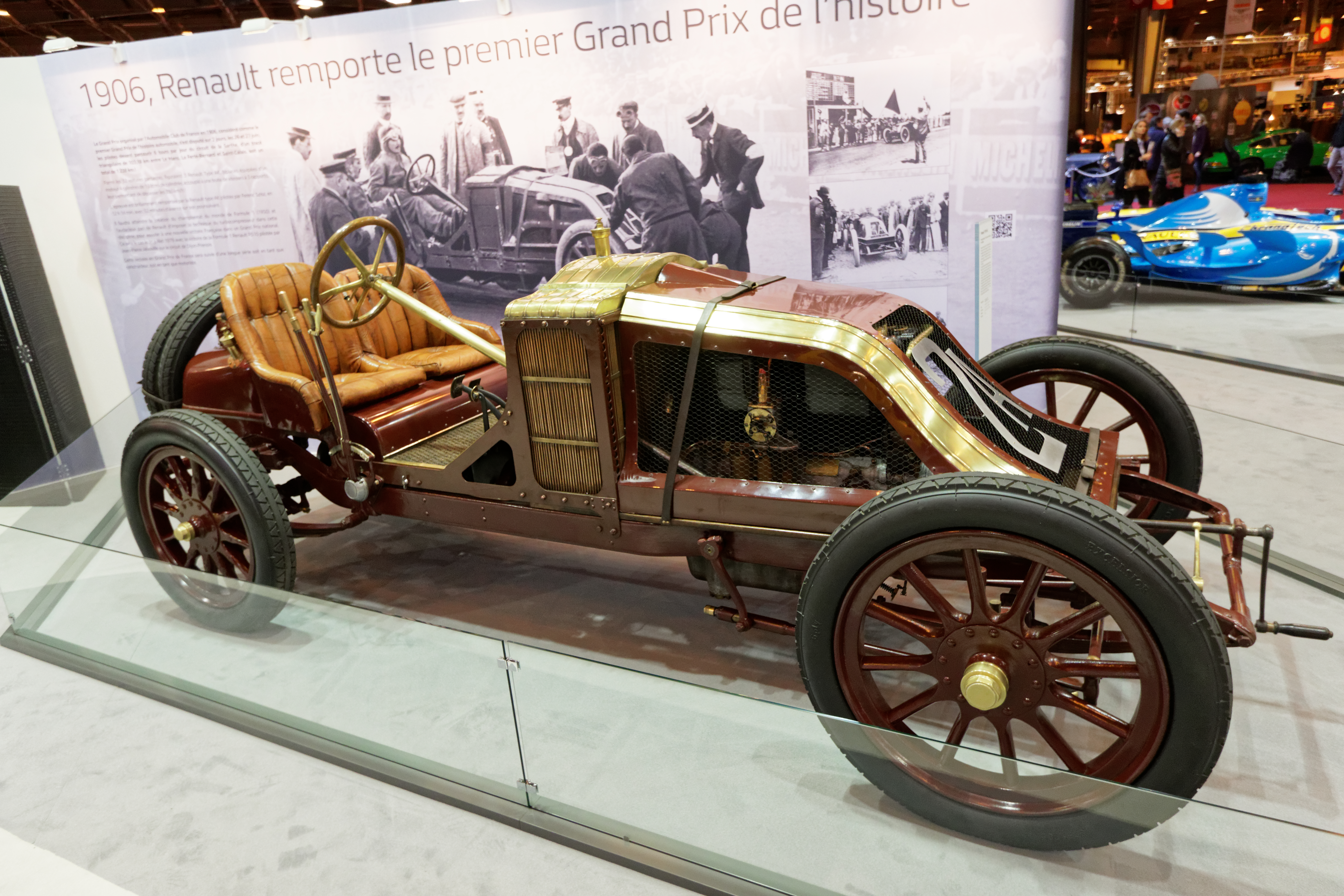

Overview
- Manufacturer: Renault
- Also called: Renault Grand Prix de l'A.C.F. Renault 3B 90CV
- Production: 1906-1908
- Designer: Louis Renault

Body and chassis
- Class: Race car
- Body style: No-door 2 passengers race car
- Layout: FR layout

Powertrain
- Engine: (1906) I4,8500 cc, 90 hp (67 kW) (1908) FR I4, 12896 cc, 90 hp (67 kW)
- Transmission: Manual, 3-gear

Chronology
- Predecessor: Renault Paris-Vienne

The Renault AK 90CV was a race car manufactured between 1906 and 1908 by French car maker Renault. It was also known as Renault Grand Prix de l'A.C.F. (Renault Grand Prix of the Automobile Club de France). The A.C.F. Grand Prix was created in 1906, where Renault and the other racing leaders like Mercedes-Benz started racing again after the 1903 tragedy where Marcel Renault and nine other people lost their lives.

Renault adopted Michelin tyres for the car. Michelin tyres were also used one hundred years later on Renault's 2006 World Championship winning Renault R26 Formula One car.

Ferenc Szisz won the first A.C.F. Grand Prix race on June 27, 1906, with an average speed of 101.195 km/h (62.880 mph).
