= Ferenc Szisz =

Hungarian racing driver (1873–1944)

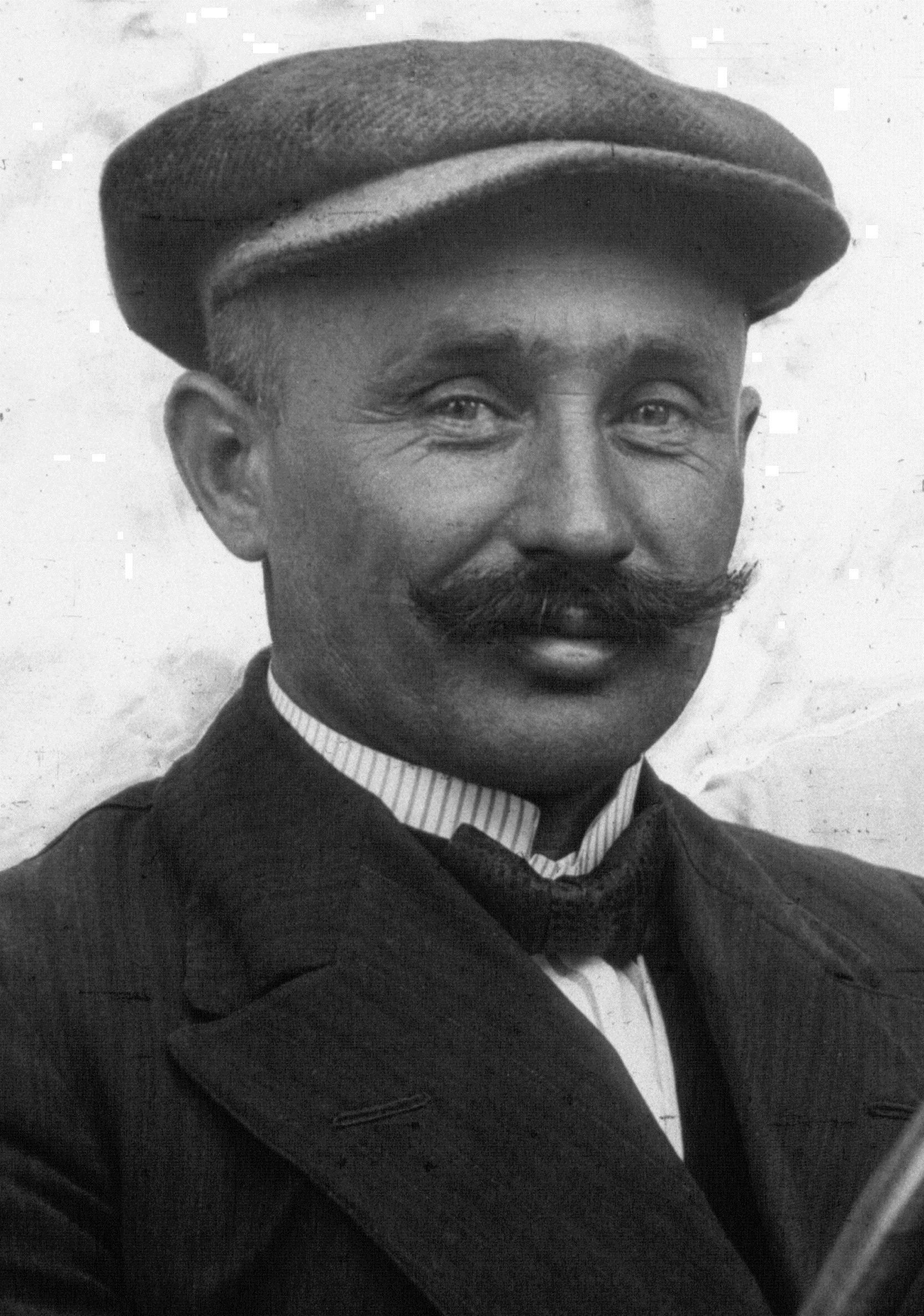
- Szisz at the 1914 French Grand Prix
- Nationality: Hungarian
- Born: September 20, 1873 Szeghalom, Kingdom of Hungary
- Died: February 21, 1944 (aged 70) Auffargis, France
- Retired: 1914
- Years active: 1906–1914
- Teams: Renault, Alda
- Starts: 4
- Wins: 1
- Podiums: 2

Ferenc Szisz (September 20, 1873 – February 21, 1944), was a Hungarian racing driver and the winner of the first Grand Prix motor racing event on a Renault AK 90CV on 26 June, 1906.

== Early life ==
Szisz was born in the small town of Szeghalom in Békés county of the Hungarian part of the former Austro-Hungarian Empire on September 20, 1873. He was trained to be a locksmith and a coppersmith but in his early twenties the growing proliferation of automobiles fascinated Szisz and he studied engineering along with car design. After time spent in several Austrian and German cities, in the spring of 1900 he ended up in Paris, France where he found work at the new Renault automobile company.

== Grand Prix career ==
At Renault, Szisz's engineering talent made him an integral part of the testing department, and when the company became involved in racing in 1902 he was chosen as the riding mechanic for Louis Renault. Following the death of Marcel Renault in the 1903 Paris-Madrid race, Szisz took over as a driver. In 1905, he finished fifth in the Gordon Bennett Cup elimination race on the Circuit d'Auvergne at Clermont-Ferrand. In October of that same year, along with other French and Italian automobile manufacturers, Renault sent a team to the United States to compete in the Vanderbilt Cup on Long Island, New York. In a field that included Felice Nazzaro and Louis Chevrolet driving for Fiat, Szisz finished fifth behind the winner, fellow Frenchman Victor Hémery driving a Darracq.

Szisz's primary duties as the head of testing at Renault limited the number of races he could compete in. However, in 1906 he achieved a permanent place in the annals of auto racing when he and his riding mechanic M. Marteau drove a Renault AK 90CV to victory in the first Grand Prix race in Le Mans. He averaged 101.2 kilometres per hour (62.9 mph). His victory in the French Grand Prix and the commercial success of the race soon led to the establishing of other Grand Prix races throughout Europe. The following year, Italy's Felice Nazzaro, who had finished second behind Szisz, captured the second French Grand Prix. Szisz competed in the 1908 race but did not finish and suffered a similar fate following mechanical problems in Savannah, Georgia at an American Grand Prize race organized by the Automobile Club of America.

In early 1909, Szisz left Renault to open his own garage in Neuilly-sur-Seine. In July 1914, Fernand Charron lured him out of retirement to drive an Alda in the French Grand Prix at Lyon. In a race won by Christian Lautenschlager in a Mercedes, Szisz was honored with the number 1 for his car, but an injury forced him out just past half the distance.

== World War I ==
European automobile racing ended in September with the onset of World War I and Szisz joined the French army, serving as head of the transport troops in Algeria until being hospitalized with typhoid fever.

== Later life ==
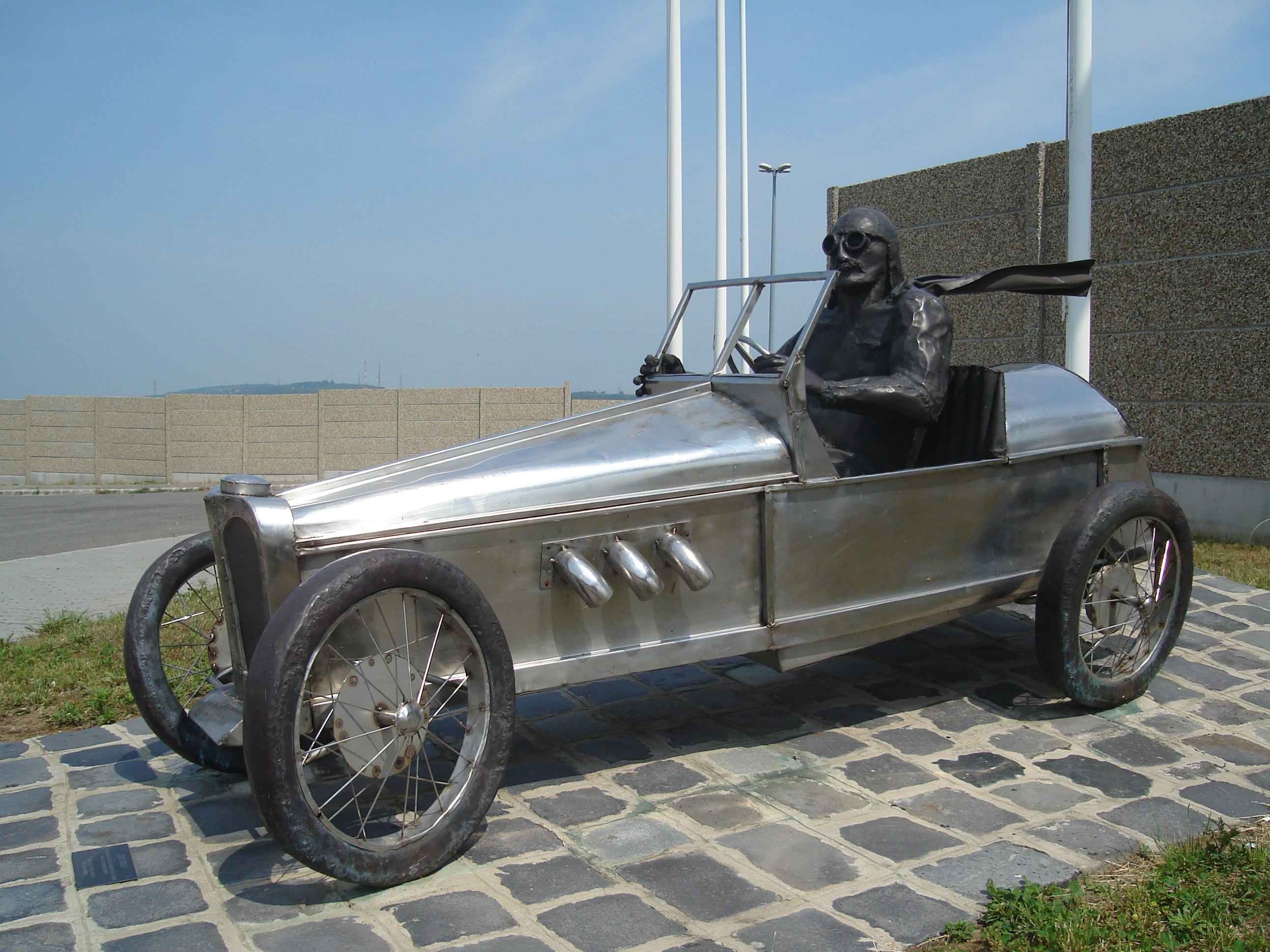
Statue of Ferenc Szisz at the main entrance of Hungaroring

At war's end, he went to work for an aircraft company until his retirement to a cottage in the country at Auffargis not far from Paris, where he died in 1944.

Ferenc Szisz and his wife are buried in the churchyard cemetery in Auffargis. The Szisz Museum is part of the Renault Museum located near the Le Mans racetrack.

== Complete Grand Prix results ==
| Year | Entrant | Pos |
|---|---|---|
| 1906 | Renault | FRA; 1 |
| 1907 | Renault | FRA; 2 |
| 1908 | Renault | FRA; Ret |
| 1914 | Alda | FRA; Ret |
