= 1906 Circuit des Ardennes =

The 1906 Circuit des Ardennes was a Grand Prix motor race held at the 53.5 mile Bastogne circuit on 13 August 1906.

== Classification ==
Pos	No	Driver	Car	Laps	Time/Retired
1	7	(Belgium) Arthur Duray	Lorraine-Dietrich	7	5h38m39.2
2	13	(France) René Hanriot	Darracq 120 hp	7	5h40m21.0
3	12	(France) Henri Rougier	Lorraine-Dietrich	7	5h50m11.4
4	5	(France) Jules Barillier	Brasier 105 hp	7	5h50m27.0
5	17	(France) Fernand Gabriel	Lorraine-Dietrich	7	5h52m14.0
6	3	(France) Albert Clément	Clement-Bayard 100 hp	7	6h02m55.2
7	21	(France) Marc Sorel	Lorraine-Dietrich	7	6h04m38.0
8	8	(France) Louis Wagner	Darracq 120 hp	7	6h14m46.0
9	15	(Germany) Otto Salzer	Mercedes 120	7	6h14m50.0
10	4	(Belgium) Camille Jenatzy	Mercedes 120	7	6h15m09.6
11	9	(France) A. Villemain	Clement-Bayard 100 hp	7	6h32m40.6
12	14	(France) Pierre Garcet	Clement-Bayard 100 hp	7	6h51m37.4
Ret	20	(France) Paul Bablot	Brasier 105 hp	5	
Ret	2	(France) Victor Hémery	Darracq 120 hp	2	
Ret	18	(France) Victor Demogeot	Darracq 120 hp	2	
Ret	10	(United Kingdom) Alexander Burton	Mercedes 120	1	
Ret	16	(France) "Pierry"	Brasier 105 hp	1	
Ret	1	(France) Robert d'Hespel	Corre	0	
Ret	11	(France) Paul Baras	Brasier 105 hp	0	
DNS	6	(Belgium) Théodore Pilette	Gregorie 70 hp		Did Not Appear
DNS	19	(United States) Foxhall Keene	Mercedes 120		Did Not Appear
