= Nanceene =

1900s French

The Nanceene was a French automobile manufactured from 1900 until around 1903. The Société Nancéienne d’Automobiles (abbreviated: SNA) built cars and trucks similar to the Gobron-Brillié.

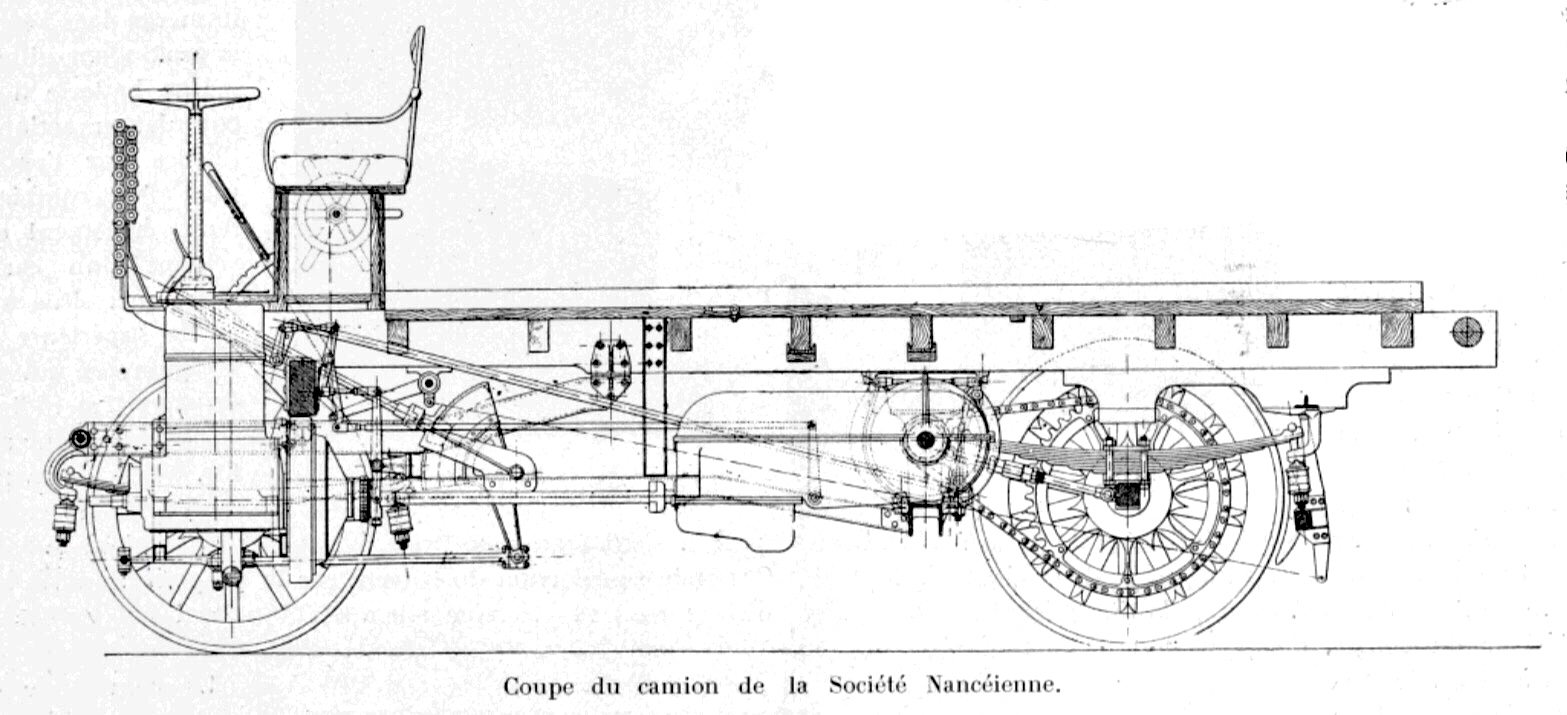
Camion Nancéienne 5 t 10 hp (1901)

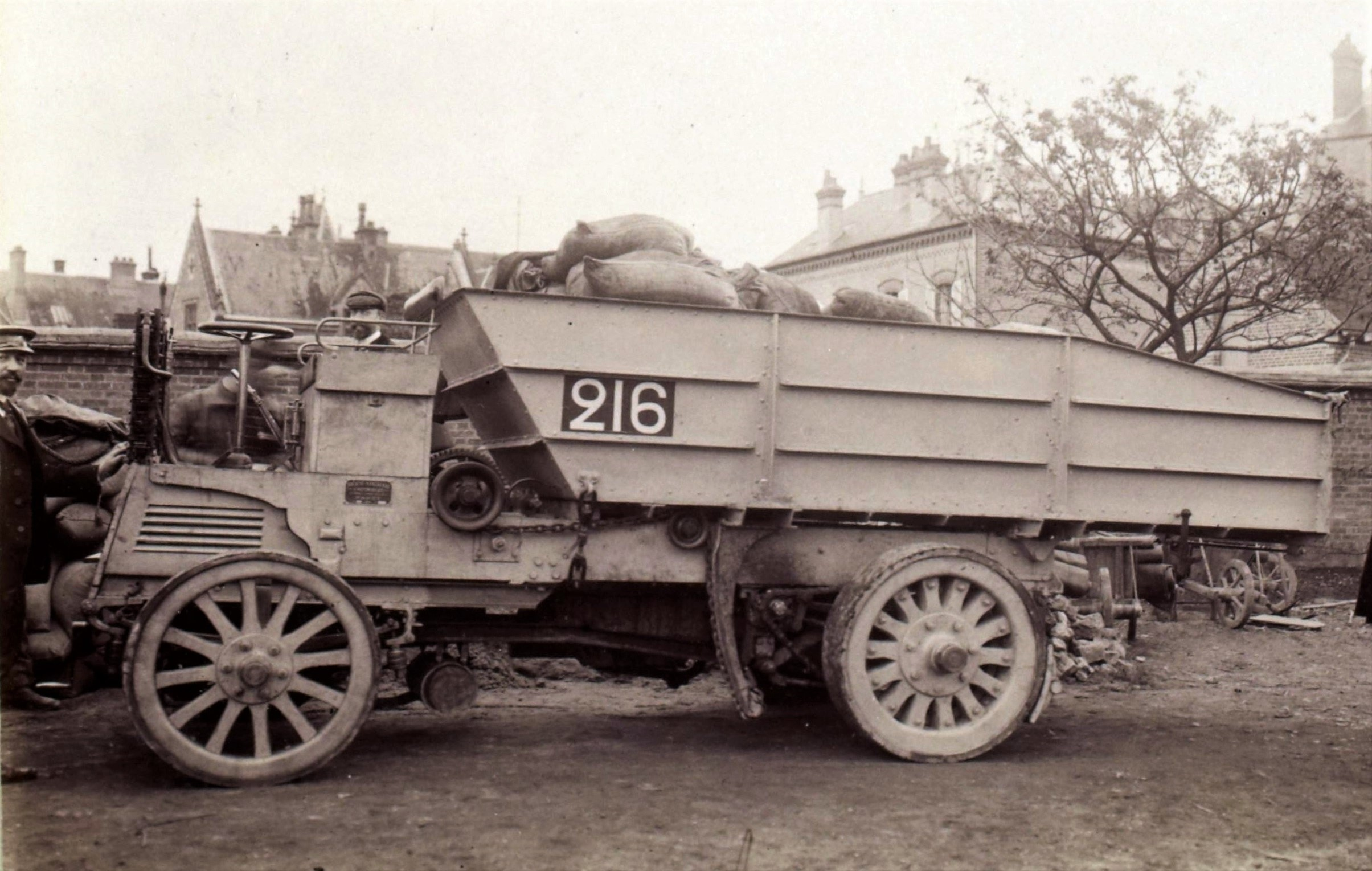
Nancéienne dump truck from 1902, (driver Eugène Brillié).

A 5-ton truck from Nancéienne with opposed-piston engines, developed under a license from Gobron-Brillié, who was a consulting engineer of the company, had a displacement of 2260 cc. The two-cylinder engine had a bore of 92 mm and a total stroke of both opposing pistons of 170 mm. The engine with an idle speed of 300 revolutions delivered up to 10 hp at 1200 revolutions per minute. The wheelbase was 2750 mm and the track width 1550 mm. The vehicle length was 4500 mm. The vehicle had a three-speed transmission. The front wheels had a diameter of 900 mm, while the rear wheels measured 950 mm. The top speed was 15 km/h.
