= Charles Jarrott (racing driver) =

English racing car driver and businessman (1877 – 1944)

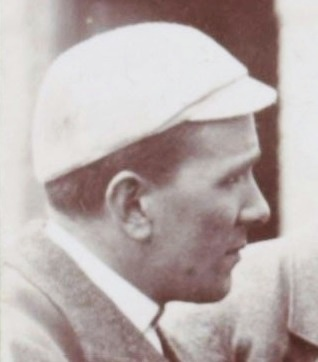
- Charles Jarrott, at the 1902 Ardennes circuit
- Born: 26 March 1877; London, England
- Died: 4 January 1944 (aged 66); London, England
- Occupation: Racing car driver
- Family: Charles Jarrott (son)

Charles Jarrott (26 March 1877 – 4 January 1944) was an English racing car driver and businessman. Jarrott raced from 1900 to 1904, winning the 1902 Circuit des Ardennes race and competing in the 1903 and 1904 Gordon Bennett Cup races. He was the chair of the Motor Cycling Club's Annual Dinner at the Trocadero on Saturday 12 December 1913. He co-founded a car import firm in 1902 and was a founder member of the Automobile Association (the AA), serving as chairman in 1922.

== Family life ==
Jarrott was born at 25 Hindon Street (now Wilton Road), Pimlico, London, to Martha (née Rosser) and Robert Jarrott, a blacksmith's labourer. He had three elder sisters. He implied that his education may have been schools in London, Cambridge and articled to a solicitor.

Jarrott married Violet Aline Vyner in 1903, the former wife of James St Clair-Erskine, 5th Earl of Rosslyn but the marriage was childless. With Ursula Jean Borlase he had a son, born on 16 June 1927, Charles who became a film director.

== Career ==
=== Racing ===
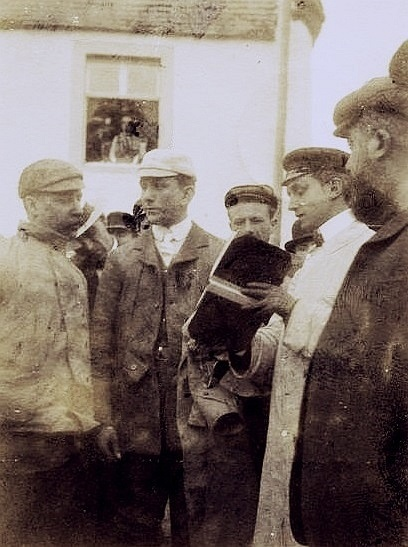
Charles Jarrott, "Circuit des Ardennes" winner, 1902.

Jarrott raced from 1900 to 1904, winning the 1902 Circuit des Ardennes race and competing in the 1903 and 1904 Gordon Bennett Cup races.

In 1901, he finished 10th in the Paris–Berlin Trail, driving a Panhard et Levassor No 13, and completing the 1,105 km in 19 hours and 59 seconds.

In 1902, he finished 3rd in the Paris–Arras–Paris race, driving a Panhard et Levassor No 3, and completing the 864 km in 13 hours 4 minutes and 12 seconds. He later entered the Paris–Vienna Trail (sometimes described as the VII Grand Prix de l'A.C.F.) where he finished 23rd in the Panhard et Levassor number 8, completing the 990 km in 20 hours, 44 minutes and 12 seconds.

Jarrott's greatest success was winning the 1902 Circuit des Ardennes in the Panhard et Levassor, completing the 6 lap, 512 km race at Bastogne in car number 8, taking 5 hours, 53 minutes 39 seconds. Jarrott had inherited the lead on lap 3 after Baron Pierre de Crawhez retired in his Mors Z.

In 1903, he finished 3rd in the Paris–Madrid Trail race (The Race of Death), driving a De Dietrich car No 1, and completing the 1,014 km until the race was abandoned at Bordeaux in 5 hours 25 minutes and 55 seconds. But he failed to finish in the Circuit des Ardennes at Bastogne after his de Dietrich No 4 suffered multiple tire failures.

In 1904, Jarrott entered the Gordon Bennett Cup Eliminator, the (I Eliminatoires Françaises de la Coupe Internationale) that was held in the Forest of Argonne, but his de Dietrich 24/28 hp, Car No 21, retired after 5 laps with mechanical problems.

=== Business ===
In 1897, he was made secretary by Harry Lawson in his British Motor Syndicate.

In 1900, Jarrott became the UK agent for Panhard et Levassor in partnership with Conservative politician Harvey Du Cros who was already a director of Dunlop Rubber and importer of French Clément-Gladiators.

In 1902, in association with W.M. Letts Jarrott founded the car import firm of 'Charles Jarrott & Letts Ltd', agents for De Dietrich cars.

In 1905, Jarrott was amongst those who founded the Automobile Association (the AA). He served as the Association's chairman in 1922.

=== WWI service ===
During the First World War, Jarrott served with the Royal Flying Corps, ending up as Inspector of Transport. He was awarded the OBE in March 1918.

== Bibliography ==
- Charles Jarrott (1906). Ten Years of Motors and Motor Racing. E. P. Dutton & Company.
