= Lorraine-Dietrich =

French automobile and aircraft engine manufacturer

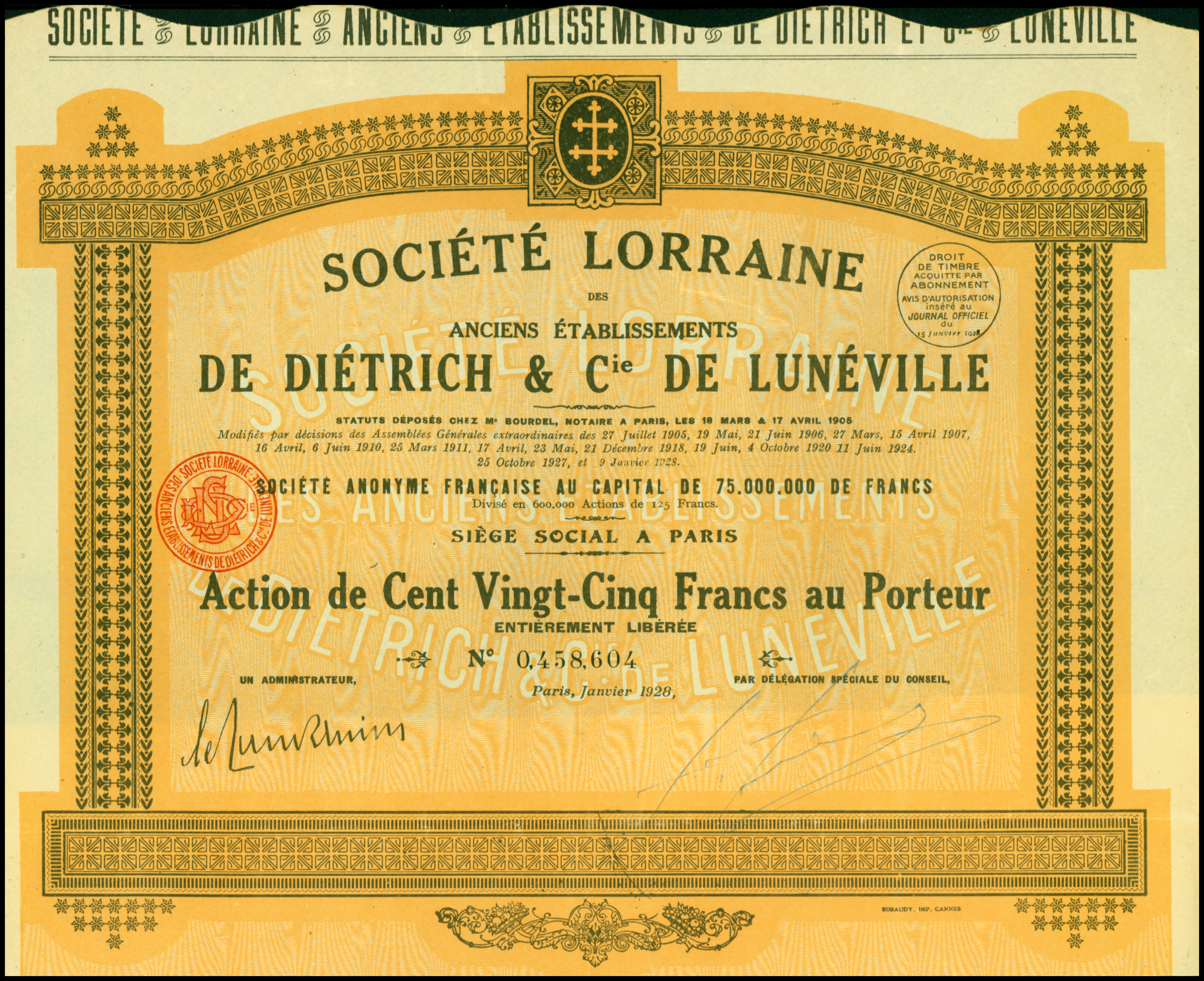
Share of the Société Lorraine des Anciens Établissements De Dietrich et Cie, issued January 1928

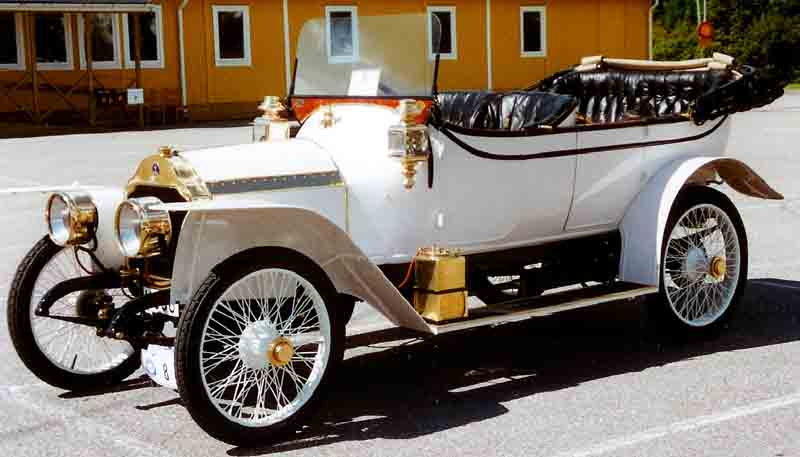
Lorraine-Dietrich 12 HP Torpedo 1912

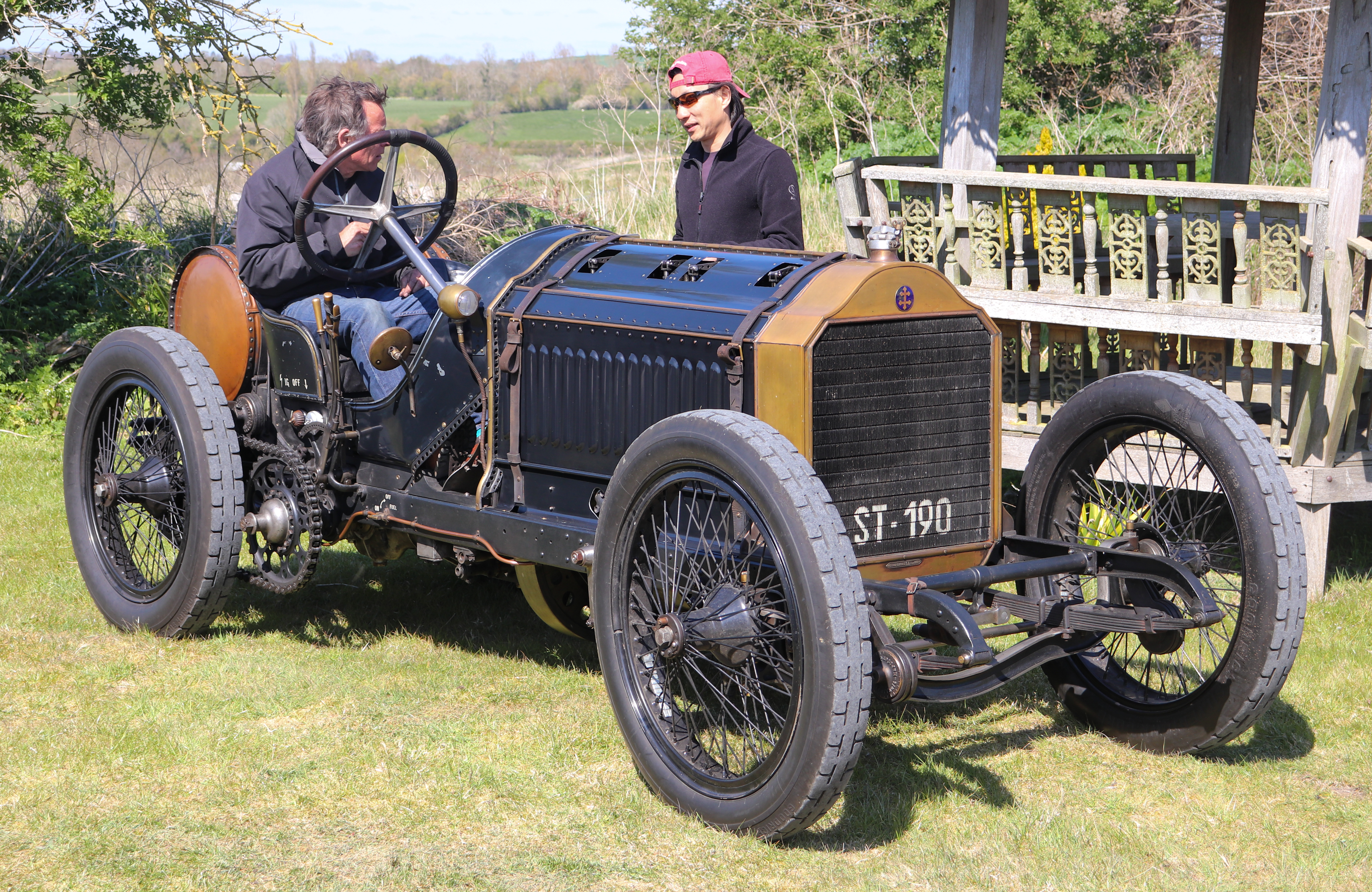
Lorraine-Dietrich 130hp 1909

Lorraine-Dietrich was a French automobile and aircraft engine manufacturer from 1896 until 1935, created when railway locomotive manufacturer Société Lorraine des Anciens Etablissements de Dietrich et Cie de Lunéville (known as De Dietrich et Cie, founded in 1884 by Jean de Dietrich) branched into the manufacture of automobiles. The Franco-Prussian War divided the company's manufacturing capacity, one plant in Niederbronn-les-Bains, Alsace, and the other in Lunéville, Lorraine.

== Beginnings ==
In 1896, the managing director of the Lunéville plant, Baron Adrien de Turckheim, bought the rights to a design by Amédée Bollée. This used a front-mounted horizontal twin engine with sliding clutches and belt drive. It had a folding top, three acetylene headlights, and, very unusual for the period, a plate glass windshield. While the company started out using engines from Bollée, De Dietrich eventually produced the entire vehicle themselves.

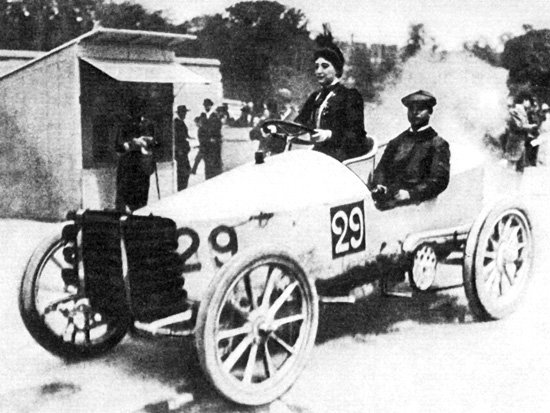
Paris–Madrid 1903 – Camille du Gast pilots her 30 hp De Dietrich, with starting number 29. Her upright seating position has been ascribed to the corsetry that the fashion of the time demanded.

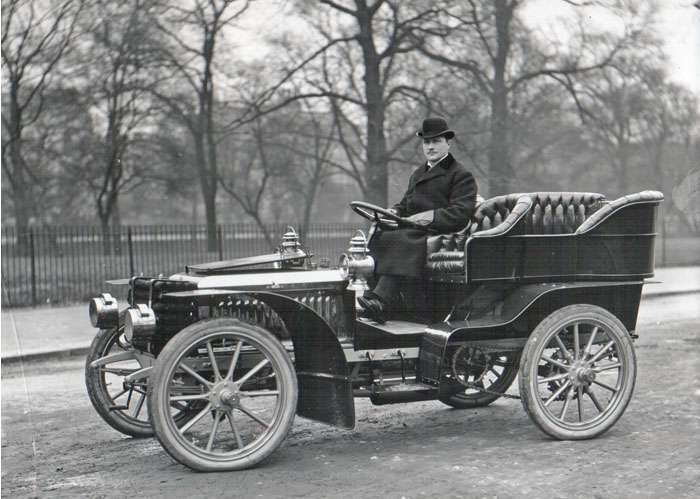
1903, 16 h.p. De Dietrich motor car

In 1898, De Dietrich debuted the Torpilleur (Torpedo) racer, which featured a four-cylinder engine and independent suspension in front, for the Paris-Amsterdam Trial; the driver, Etienne "Gaudry" Giraud, wrecked en route, but still placed third. The response was substantial, exceeding one million gold francs. The 1899 torpilleur was less successful, despite underslung chassis, a rear-mounted monobloc four, and twin carburettors; poor preparation left none of the works teams able to complete the Tour de France.

The Bollée-inspired design was supplanted by a licence-built Belgian Vivinus voiturette at Niederbronn and a Marseille-designed Turcat-Méry at Lunéville, following a 1901 deal with that cash-strapped company.

In 1902, De Dietrich & Cie hired 21-year-old Ettore Bugatti, who produced prize-winning cars in 1899 and 1901, designing an overhead valve 24 hp (18 kW) four-cylinder with four-speed transmission to replace the Vivinus, colloquially (and retroactively) referred to as the Type 2. There he partnered with Bollée, and became acquainted with Émile Mathis, marketing director. He also created their 30/35 of 1903, with the models today referred to as the Types 3-7 attributed to him before quitting to join Strasbourg-based Mathis in the German Alsace in 1904.

The same year, management at Niederbronn quit car production, leaving it entirely to Lunéville, with the Alsace market being sold a Turcat-Méry badge-engineered as a De Dietrich. Even at the time, this was seen with some disdain, and Lunéville put the cross of Lorraine on the grille to distinguish them. Nevertheless, under the skin, they were little different, nor would they be until 1911. For all that, the Lorraine-Dietrich was a prestige marque, ranking with Crossley and Itala, while attempting to break into the "super-luxury" market between 1905 and 1908 with a handful of £4,000 (US$20,000) six-wheeler limousines de voyage.

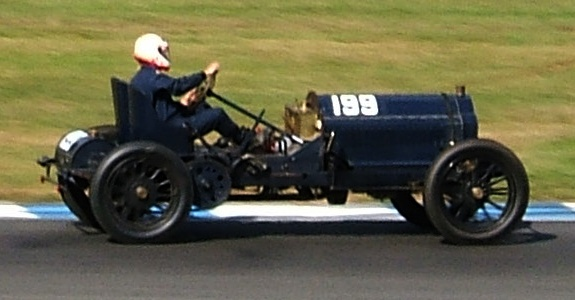
1905 Lorraine-Dietrich CR2 racing car

Like Napiers and Mercedes, Lorraine-Dietrich's reputation was built in part on racing, which was "consistent if not distinguished", including Charles Jarrott's third in the 1903 Paris–Madrid race and a 1-2-3 in the 1906 Circuit des Ardennes, led by ace works driver Arthur Duray.

De Dietrich bought out Isotta Fraschini in 1907, producing two OHC cars to Isotta Fraschini designs, including a 10 hp (7.5 kW) allegedly created by Bugatti. Also that year, Lorraine-Dietrich took over Ariel Mors Limited of Birmingham, for the sole British model, a 20 hp (15 kW) four, shown at the Olympia Motor Show in 1908, offered as bare chassis, Salmons & Sons convertible, and Mulliner cabriolet. (The British branch was not a success, lasting only about a year.)

For 1908, De Dietrich offered a line of chain-driven touring fours, the 18/28 hp, 28/38 hp, 40/45 hp, and 60/80 hp, priced between £550 and £960, and a 70/80 hp six at £1,040. The British version differed, having shaft drive. That year, the names of the automotive and aero-engine divisions were changed to Lorraine-Dietrich.

By 1914, all De Dietrichs were shaft-driven, and numbered a 12/16, an 18/20, a new 20/30 tourers, and a sporting four-cylinder 40/75 (in the mold of Mercer or Stutz), all built at Argenteuil, Seine-et-Oise (which became company headquarters postwar).

== Post-World War I ==
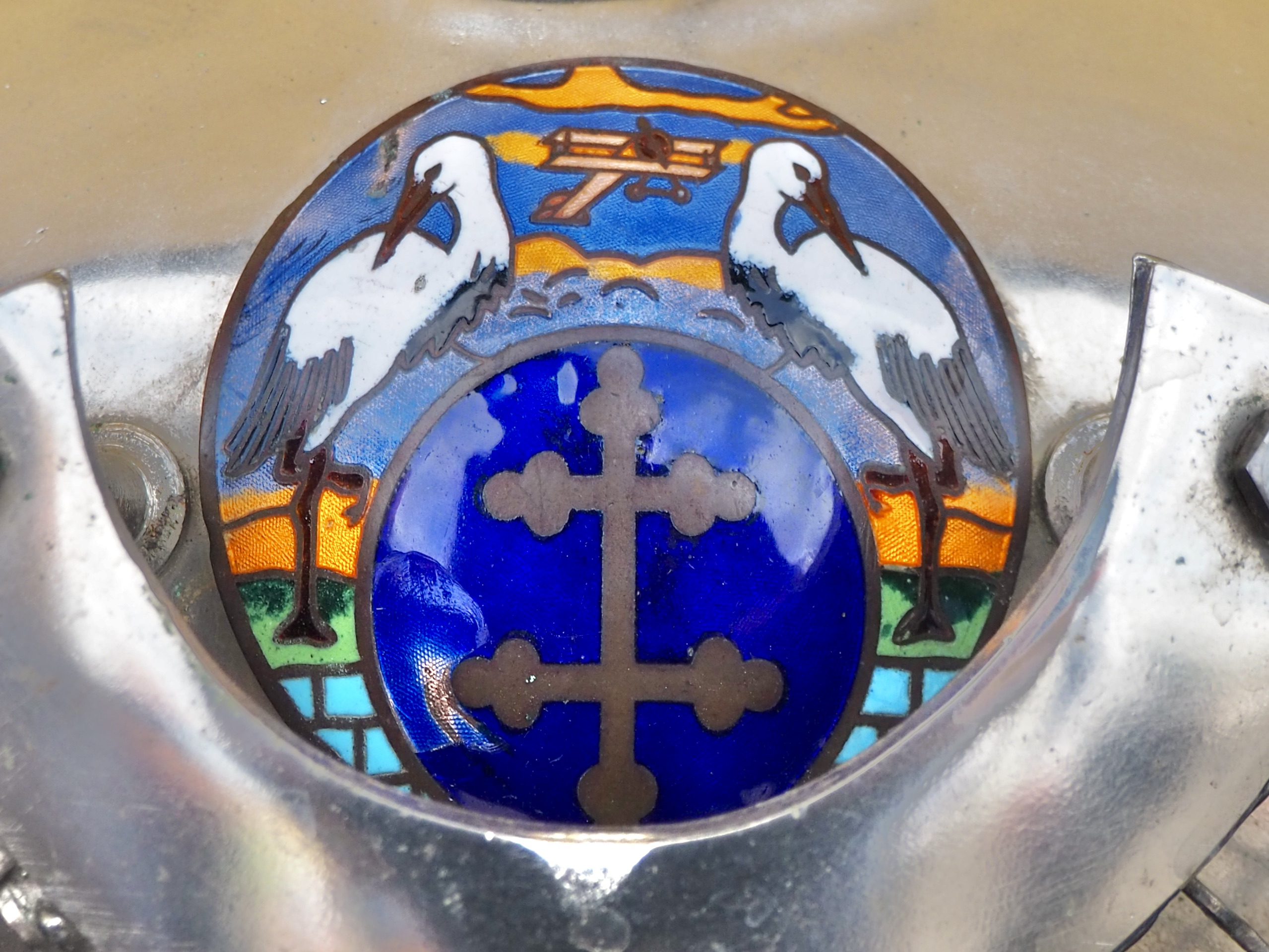
Lorraine-Dietrich badge from 1925, as on the B3 6 Sport model, Goodwood Festival of Speed 2023

After World War I, with Lorraine restored to France, the company restarted manufacture of automobiles and aero-engines. Their 12-cylinder aero-engines were used by Breguet, IAR, and Aero, among others.

In 1919, new technical director Marius Barbarou (late of Delaunay-Belleville) introduced a new model in two wheelbases, the A1-6 and B2-6, joined three years later by the B3-6, with either short or long wheelbase. All fell in the 15 CV fiscal horsepower category, sharing the 3,445 cc (210.2 cu in) six cylinder engine, which had overhead valves, hemispherical head, aluminium pistons, and four-bearing crankshaft.

The performance was such in 1923, three tourers "put up a passable showing" at the first 24 Hours of Le Mans, leading to the creation for 1924 of the 15 Sport, with twin carburetion, larger valves, and Dewandre-Reprusseau servo-assisted four-wheel brakes (at a time when four-wheel brakes of any kind were a rarity); they ran second and third, and were comparable to the 3 litre Bentleys. The 15 CV Sport did better in 1925, winning Le Mans, followed home by a sister in third, while in 1926, Bloch and Rossignol won at an average 106 km/h (66 mph), leading a 1-2-3 sweep by Lorraines. Lorraine-Dietrich thus became the first marque to win Le Mans twice and the first to win in two consecutive years.

This publicity contributed to touring 15s being bodied by Gaston Grümmer, also Argenteuil's director, who produced coachwork for the likes of Aurora, Olympia, Gloriosa, and Chiquita. The 15 CV was joined by the 12 CV, a 2,297 cc (140.2 cu in) four-cylinder car (until 1929), and the 30 CV, with a 6,107 cc (372.7 cu in) six cylinder engine (until 1927), while the 15 CV survived until 1932; the 15 CV Sport fell in 1930, losing its last race, the 1931 Monte Carlo Rally, when Donald Healey's Invicta edged Jean-Pierre Wimille by a tenth of a point.

== Name change ==
The De Dietrich family sold its share in the company, which became simply known as Lorraine from 1928 on.

== End of automobile production ==
The 15 CV was supplanted by the 20 CV, which had a 4,086 cc (249.3 cu in) engine, of which just a few hundred were made. Automobile production eventually became unprofitable and, after the failure of their 20 CV model, the concern ceased production of automobiles in 1935.

In 1930, De Dietrich Argenteuil plant was absorbed by Société Générale Aéronautique, and was converted to making aircraft engines and six-wheel trucks licensed from Tatra. By 1935, Lorraine-Dietrich had disappeared from the automobile industry. Until World War II, Lorraine concentrated on the military market, manufacturing vehicles such as the Lorraine 37L armoured carrier.

The Lunéville plant returned to rail locomotives. In 1950s it was acquired by the US company General Trailers and as Trailor (Trailmobile Lorraine) manufactured trucks.

== Aircraft engines ==
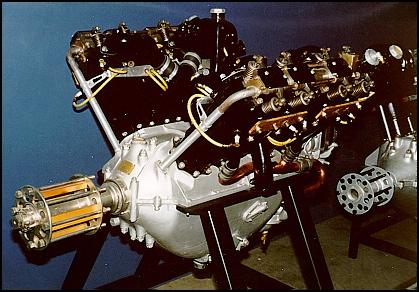
Lorraine-Dietrich 8Be aircraft engine.

- Lorraine 5P – 5 cyl radial
- Lorraine 6A – (AM) 110 hp
- Lorraine 7M Mizar – 7 cyl radial
- Lorraine 8A – V-8
- Lorraine 8B – V-8
- Lorraine 9N Algol – 9 cyl radial
- Lorraine Dietrich 12Cc ? Dc in error?
- Lorraine 12 D – V-12
- Lorraine 12E Courlis – W-12 450 hp
- Lorraine 12F Courlis – W-12 600 hp
- Lorraine 12H Pétrel – V-12
- Lorraine 12Q Eider
- Lorraine 12R Sterna – V-12 700 hp
- Lorraine 12Rcr Radium – inverted V-12 with turbochargers 2,000 hp
- Lorraine 14A Antarès – 14 cylinder radial 500 hp
- Lorraine 14E – 14 cylinder radial 470 hp
- Lorraine 18F Sirius 18-cyl radial
- Lorraine 18G Orion – W-18
- Lorraine 18K – W-18
- Lorraine-Dietrich 18Kd
- Lorraine 24 – W-24 1,000 hp
- Lorraine 24E Taurus – 24 cyl radial (six banks of 4-inline?) 1,600 hp
- Lorraine AM (moteur d’Aviation Militaire (A.M.)) – derived from German 6-cyl in-line engines
- Lorraine Algol Junior – 230 hp
- Lorraine-Latécoère 8B
- Lorraine Diesel – built in 1932, rated at 200 hp

== See also ==
- De Dietrich Ferroviaire
- List of 24 Hours of Le Mans winners
