= Paris–Madrid race =

1903 automobile race

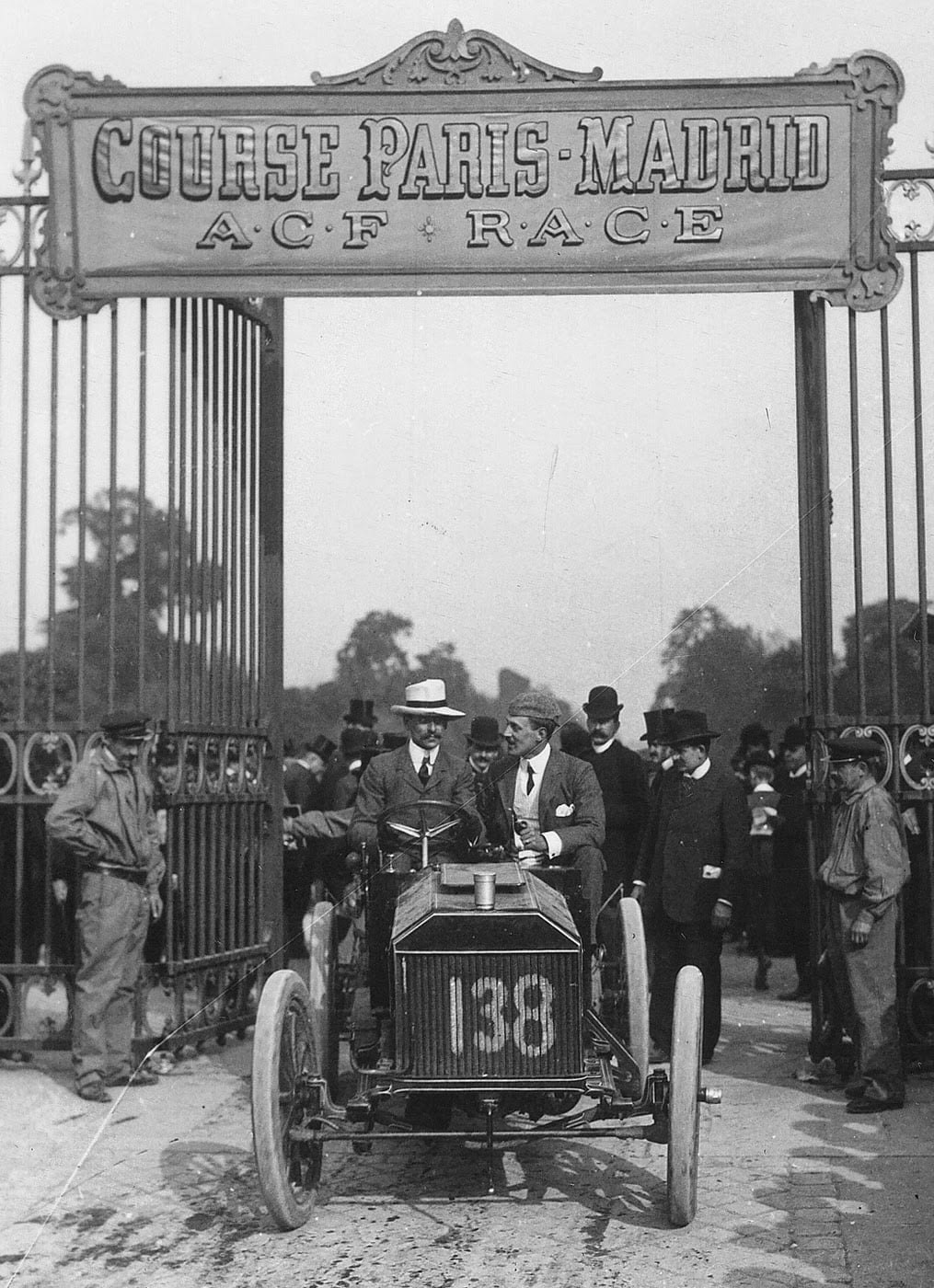
- Mark Mayhew and riding mechanic Alex Mosses on their Napier L1 at the start. Their race ended in a crash after a steering failure.
- Date: May 24–27, 1903
- Time: 3:30 AM (scheduled); 3:45 AM (actual) (CEST)
- Location: Versailles, France
- Motive: Promotion of the automotive industry
- Organized by: Automobile Club de France (ACF); Automóvil Club Español
- Participants: 220 – 275 (Note: The total number of entrants who started the race differs across accounts. Estimates include "approximately 220'", "'221 entries representing all the major car firms of Europe," "'no less than 228") starters (of 316 entries)
- Deaths: 6 – 8 (5 drivers, 3 spectators)
- Injuries: ≥12

The Paris–Madrid race (Note: Also referred to as the 1903 Paris-Madrid, The Race of Death, The Race to Death, Course Paris-Madrid - ACF Race.) was a city-to-city motor race that began on 24 May 1903. The event was organized by the Automobile Club de France (ACF) and the Royal Automobile Club of Spain, (Spanish: Real Automóvil Club de España, RACE).

The race became well-known for the number of deaths and injuries among both drivers and spectators, and was cancelled at the end of the first leg in Bordeaux. It was the last city-to-city race of its kind to be held on open, public roads. Fernand Gabriel, driving a Mors Dauphines, was declared the winner.

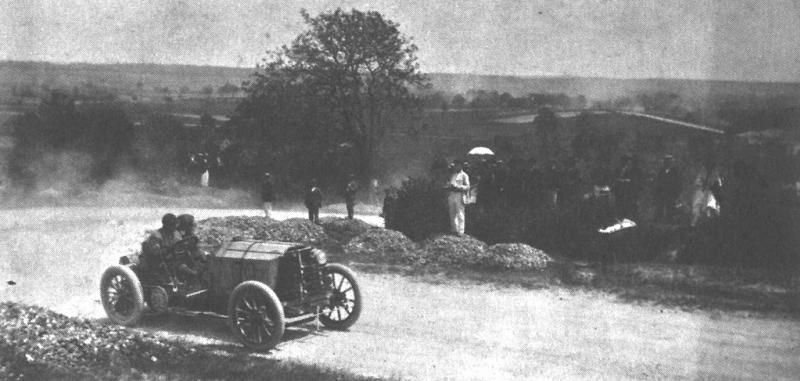
Henri Rougier driving his Turcat-Méry 45-hp finished 11th overall, and 9th in the heavy car class

== Background ==
Popularity in motor racing had been growing across Europe since the 1896 Paris–Marseille–Paris, which was the first city-to-city motor race where the winner was determined by finishing time, as opposed to reliability and overall performance in the Paris–Rouen race the previous year.

Constructors were motivated to increase the power of their cars, with speeds growing from 5 miles per hour (8.0 km/h) to 80 miles per hour (130 km/h). The increase in power led organizers to impose a weight limit of 1,000 kilograms (2,200 lb) on the "Large" class of cars. Other classes included "Light" and "Voiturettes".

Races at the time were still held on public roads, which meant drivers had to avoid poor quality road surfaces, railroad crossings, farm and household animals, bystanders, and other obstacles.

== Race ==
To maximize the number of cars visible during daylight, the race was scheduled for 3:30 AM. However, it was delayed 15 minutes due to poor visibility. Drivers set off at one-minute intervals.

=== Attendance ===
The race was heavily promoted as "one of the biggest sporting spectacles in history."

Over 100,000 spectators were present at the beginning of the race in Bordeaux, while it is estimated that millions of people watched the event from the roadside along the course.

=== Results by class ===
After starting 168th, Fernand Gabriel was the first driver overall to reach Bordeaux when the race was called off. He completed the stage in 5 hours and 14 minutes at an average speed of 65 miles per hour (105 km/h).

The following results were determined by the finishing order at Bordeaux.

Heavy cars
Pos	Driver	Constructor
1	Fernand Gabriel	Mors
2	Joseph Salleron	Mors
3	Charles Jarrott	De Dietrich

Light cars
Pos	Driver	Constructor
1	Louis Renault	Renault
2	Paul Baras	Darracq
3	Page	Decauville

Voiturettes
Pos	Driver	Constructor
1	Masson	Clement
2	Jules Barillier	Richard-Brasier
3	Louis Wagner	Darracq

== Legacy ==
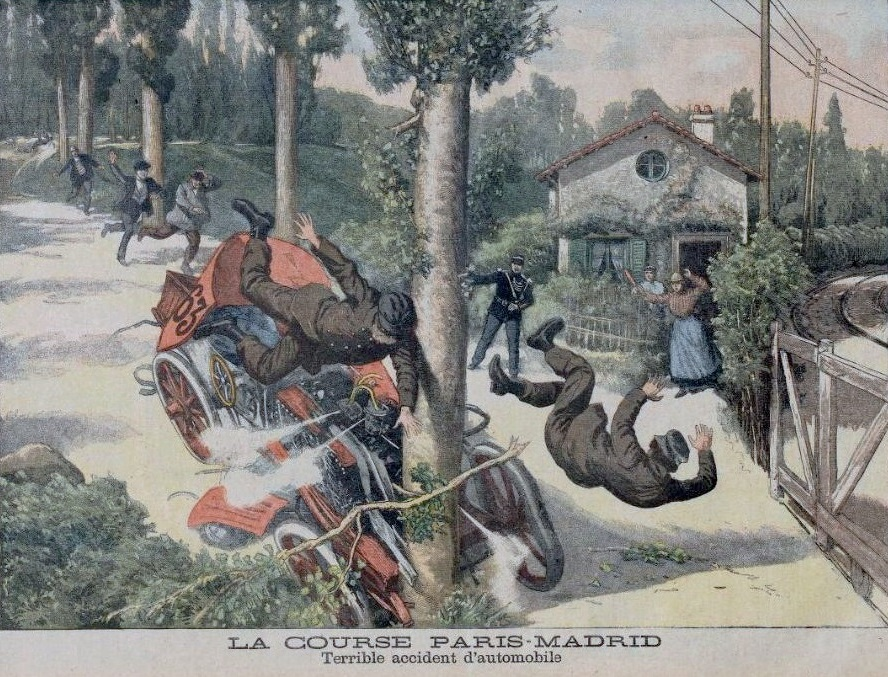
Illustration of the accident that took the lives of Marcel Renault and his mechanic.

The race claimed the lives of many notable drivers, including Marcel Renault, one of the founders of Renault. His brother, Louis Renault, finished first in the light car class.

In his memoir, third-place finisher Charles Jarrott suggested that the "deplorable disasters" of the race could have been avoided with better organization.

== See also ==
- 1896 Paris–Marseille–Paris
- Motorsport before 1906
- Grand Prix motor racing

== Sources ==
- Friedman, Michael; Wallace, Brandon (2023), "Circuits of Capital: The Spatial Development of Formula One Racetracks", in Sturm, Damion; Wagg, Stephen; Andrews, David L. (eds.), The History and Politics of Motor Racing: Lives in the Fast Lane, Cham: Springer International Publishing, pp. 619–640, doi:10.1007/978-3-031-22825-4_24, ISBN 978-3-031-22825-4
- Jarrott, Charles (1906). "Paris-Madrid". Ten Years of Motors and Motor Racing (PDF). E. Grant Richards. pp. 99, 165–181.
- Northey, Tom; Ward, Ian, eds. (1974). The World of Automobiles: An Illustrated Encyclopedia of the Motor Car: Volume 5 Dai/Enf. Vol. 5. New York, N.Y.: Columbia House. pp. 506, 508, 514.
- Northey, Tom; Ward, Ian, eds. (1977). The World of automobiles : an illustrated encyclopedia of the motor car : Volume 14 Oil/Pet. Vol. 14. Milwaukee: Purnell Reference Books. p. 1650. ISBN 978-0-8393-6009-4.
- Ó Cofaigh, Éamon (2022). "Motor Sport in France: Commodifying the Car". A Vehicle for Change: Popular Representations of the Automobile in 20th-Century France. Liverpool University Press. pp. 35–74. doi:10.2307/j.ctv2kcwp1r.7. ISBN 978-1-80207-011-8. JSTOR j.ctv2kcwp1r.7.
- Rendall, Ivan (1993). Chequered Flag: 100 Years of Motor Racing. London: Weidenfeld and Nicolson. pp. 32–33. 356. ISBN 978-0-297-83220-1.
- Seneca, Michael J. (January 1, 2003). The Fairmount Park Motor Races, 1908-1911. McFarland. p. 3. ISBN 978-0-7864-1665-3.
- Skillen, Graham (June 2003). "City to city, dust to dust". Motor Sport. Archived from the original on June 18, 2024.
- Thoms, David; Holden, Len; Claydon, Tim, eds. (1998). The Motor Car and Popular Culture in the 20th Century. Aldershot: Ashgate Publishing Ltd. ISBN 1-85928-461-2.
- Ward, Ian; Innes, Brian, eds. (1974). The World of Automobiles : An Illustrated Encyclopedia of the Motor Car : Volume 16 Ral/Rolla. Vol. 16. New York, N.Y.: Columbia House. pp. 1848, 1850.
- Wagg, Stephen (2023), "It Was Ironic That He Should Die in Bed: Injury, Death and the Politics of Safety in the History of Motor Racing", in Sturm, Damion; Wagg, Stephen; Andrews, David L. (eds.), The History and Politics of Motor Racing: Lives in the Fast Lane, Global Culture and Sport Series, Cham: Springer International Publishing, pp. 223–246, doi:10.1007/978-3-031-22825-4_10, ISBN 978-3-031-22825-4
