= Pierre de Caters =

Belgian racing driver and aviator (1875–1944)

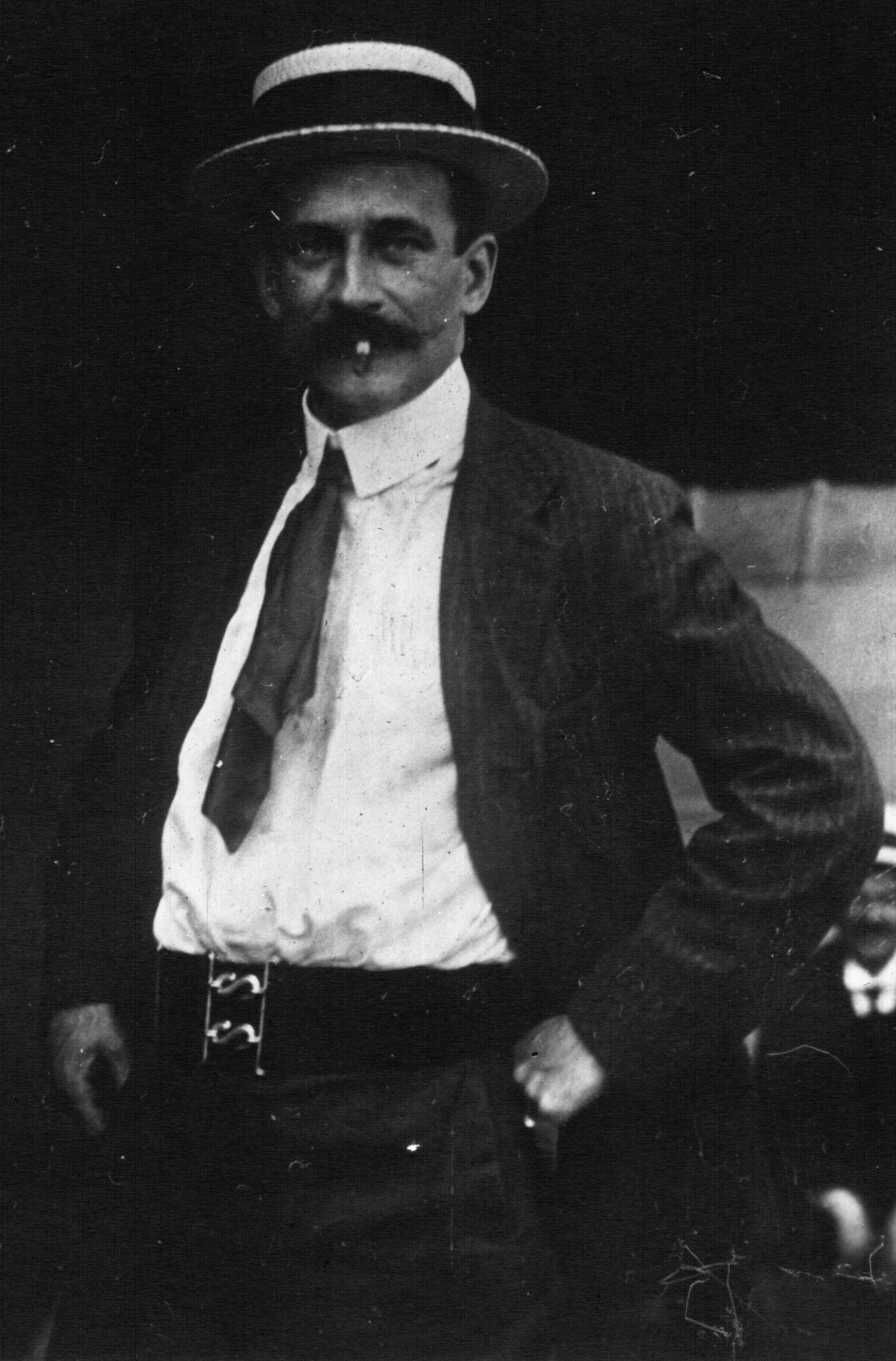

Baron Pierre de Caters (25 December 1875, in Berchem – 21 March 1944, in Paris) was a Belgian adventurer, aviator and car and motorboat racer. In 1908, he was the first Belgian to fly an aircraft.

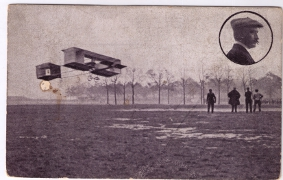
De Caters' Voisin at Antwerp Aviation Week 1909.

He was also the first Belgian to receive a pilot's license from the Belgian air club on 2 December 1909 and received a gold medal for the first kilometer in the same year. He was the first aircraft manufacturer in Belgium and the first instructor of military aviation. He also took part in car and motorboat races in Belgium and France.

In 1904, he briefly held the land speed record, driving a DMG Mercedes Simplex at 97.25 mph (156.51 km/h) on a 1 km (0.62 mi) beach course in Ostend, Belgium.

In World War I he joined Belgian military aviation, commanding the flying school of Étampes.

== Journey to India ==
On 16 November 1910, de Caters embarked to India with two Aviator airplanes. He was accompanied by Jules Tyck, another Belgian pilot.

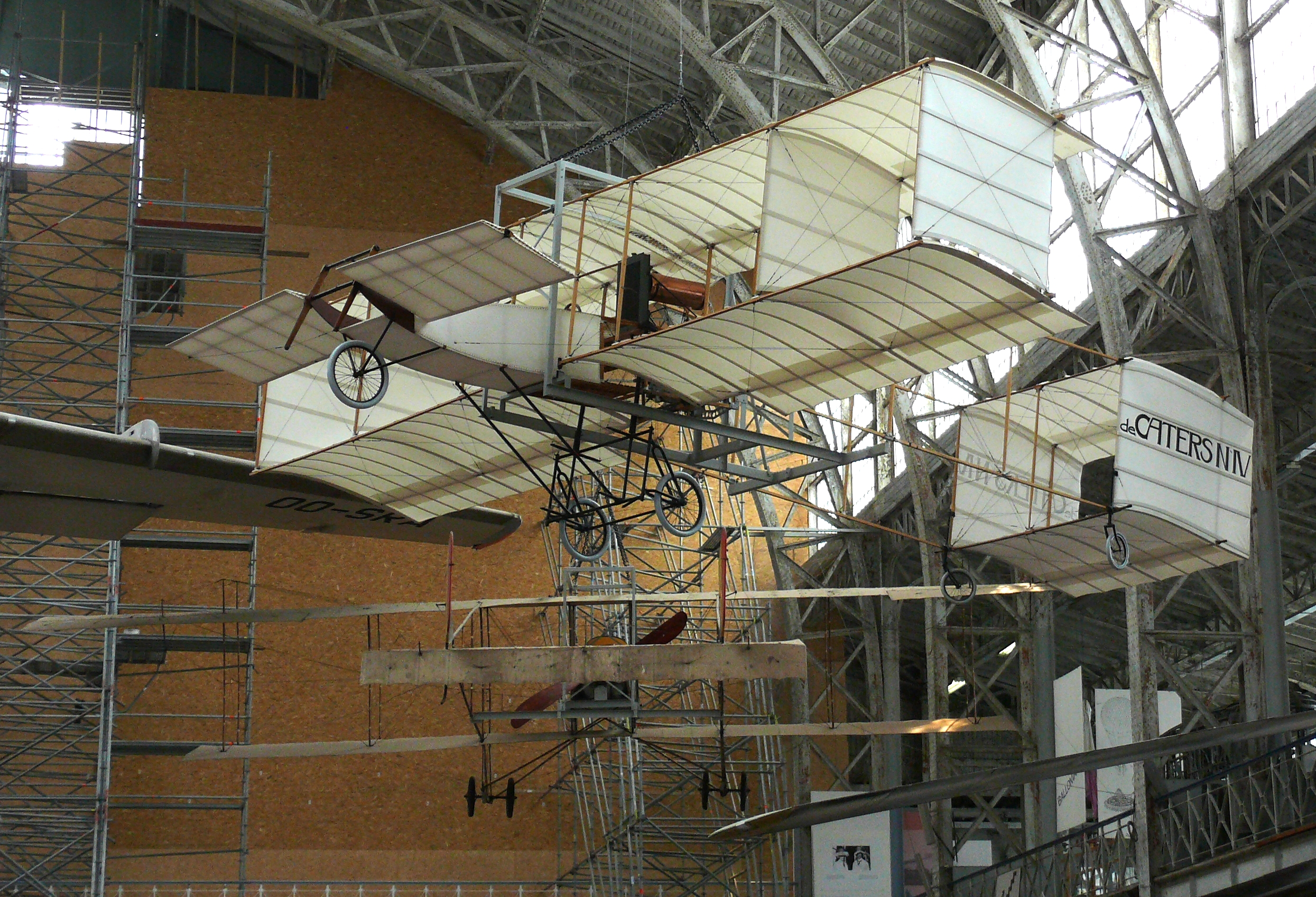
Replica in the Royal Military Museum (Brussels) of the Voisin de Caters IV

The city of Bombay refused the organization of an aviation meeting. Then the two airmen traveled to Calcutta with their aircraft crated. In Calcutta, de Caters flew several times from the Club of Tollygunge. On 21 December, he flew for 27 minutes with Mrs. Mrinalini Sen, sister-in-law of the Maharaja of Cooch Behar as passenger. One of the Aviators was damaged by fire. On 2 February 1911, de Caters and Tyck flew in Bangalore. They were received by the Maharaja of Mysore. From 16 to 18 February, Pierre flew from Secunderabad in the Hyderabad state. The Indian tour was completed and Pierre de Caters returned to Europe. A little later Aviator was dissolved and de Caters did not take part in any further competitions.

== See also ==
- 1906 Targa Florio
