= Arthur Duray =

Belgian racing driver (1882–1954)

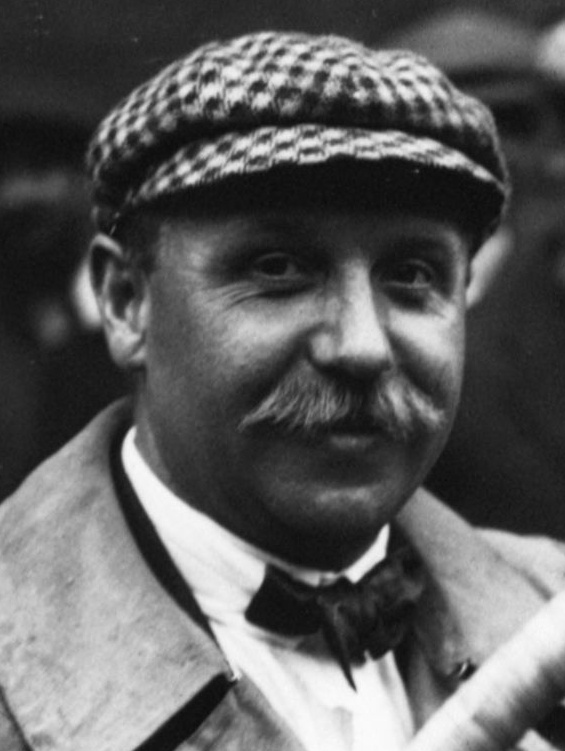
- Duray at the 1914 French Grand Prix
- Born: Arthur Jules Joseph Duray; 9 February 1882 Ixelles, Brussels, Belgium
- Died: 11 February 1954 (aged 72) 18th arrondissement of Paris, France

Champ Car career
- 3 races run over 2 years
- First race: 1914 Indianapolis 500 (Indianapolis)
- Last race: 1918 Liberty Sweepstakes (Uniontown)
Wins	Podiums	Poles
0	1	0

24 Hours of Le Mans career
- Years: 1924, 1926–1928, 1934
- Teams: Ariès, Équipe de l’Ours
- Best finish: 14th (1934)
- Class wins: 0

Arthur Jules Joseph Duray (9 February 1882 – 11 February 1954) was a Belgian racing driver and aviator. He was one of the first Belgians to pilot an aircraft, holding Belgian license #3. Duray is best known for breaking the land speed record on three occasions between July 1903 and March 1904.

After serving in the French Foreign Legion during the First World War, Duray acquired French nationality by naturalization in 1933.

American racer George Stewart legally changed his name to Leon Duray in tribute to Arthur Duray.

== Motorsports career results ==
=== Indianapolis 500 results ===
Year	Car	Start	Qual	Rank	Finish	Laps	Led	Retired
1914	14	10	90.000	13	2	200	77	Running
Totals						200	77	

Starts	1
Poles	0
Front Row	0
Wins	0
Top 5	1
Top 10	1
Retired	0

=== Other race results (probably incomplete) ===
- 1904 Eliminatoires Françaises de la Coupe Internationale DNF Gobron-Brillié
- 1904 Circuit des Ardennes 6th Darracq
- 1904 Coppa Florio 5th Darracq
- 1904 La Consuma Hillclimb 3rd Darracq 80 hp
- 1905 Eliminatoires Françaises de la Coupe Internationale 3rd De Dietrich 24/28 (Vanderbilt qualifier)
- 1905 Circuit des Ardennes 7th De Dietrich 24/28
- 1905 Coppa Florio 2nd Lorraine-Dietrich
- 1905 Vanderbilt Cup DNF De Dietrich 24/28
- 1905 Gordon Bennett Cup 6th Lorraine-Dietrich
- 1906 Circuit des Ardennes 1st De Dietrich 130 hp (97 kW)
- 1906 French Grand Prix at LeMans 8th Lorraine-Dietrich (aggregate)
- 1906 Vanderbilt Cup 3rd Lorraine-Dietrich
- 1907 Dieppe DNF
- 1907 Moscow-St.Petersburg 1st De Dietrich 60 hp (45 kW)
- 1907 Kaiser Preis 12th Lorraine-Dietrich with Fernand Gabriel Heat 1
- 1907 Kaiser Preis 4th Lorraine-Dietrich Heat 2
- 1907 Kaiser Preis DNF Lorraine-Dietrich Final
- 1907 French Grand Prix at Dieppe DNF Lorraine-Dietrich (fastest lap 75.4 mph)
- 1907 Coppa Velocita di Brescia DNF (7th) Lorraine-Dietrich
- 1907 Targa Florio 4th Lorraine-Dietrich
- 1908 Moscow-St.Petersburg DNF Lorraine-Dietrich
- 1908 Dieppe DNF Lorraine-Dietrich
- 1908 Coppa Florio DNF Lorraine-Dietrich
- 1908 American Grand Prize 10th De Dietrich
- 1911 French Grand Prix at Lyon 8th
- 1911 French Grand Prix at LeMans 4th Lorraine-Dietrich
- 1911 Coupe des Voiturettes DNF Excelsior
- 1912 French Grand Prix at Dieppe 10th Alcyon
- 1912 Coupe de la Sarthe at LeMans 11th Alcyon
- 1912 French Grand Prix at LeMans 10th Alcyon
- 1913 French Grand Prix/Coupe de la Sarthe 5th Delage Y
- 1914 Grand Prix at Lyon 8th Delage S
- 1914 French Grand Prix at LeMans 4th
- 1924 Coupe de L'Autodrome 2nd D'Aoust Hispano-Suiza
- 1924 Match des Champions 3rd D'Aoust Hispano-Suiza
- 1925 Spa 24 Hours 38th
- 1926 24 Hours of Le Mans 37th Ariès 5-8 CV
- 1927 24 Hours of Le Mans 21st Ariès 8-10 CV
- 1928 24 Hours of Le Mans 30th Ariès 8-10 CV
- 1928 French Grand Prix at Saint-Gaudens ??
- 1930 Belgian Grand Prix 4th Ariès
- 1931 Spa 24 Hours 13th B.N.C. (with Charlier, first in class)
- 1933 Spa 24 hours 14th Amilcar C6 (with Jean de Gabardie, first in class)
- 1934 24 Hours of Le Mans 14th Amilcar

=== Land Speed Records ===
- 1903 July 17 83.46 mph (134.32 km/h) Ostend, Belgium Gobron-Brillié fr:Gobron-Brillié 'Paris-Madrid'
- 1903 November 5 84.73 mph (136.36 km/h) Dourdan, France Gobron-Brillié 'Paris-Madrid'
- 1904 March 31 88.76 mph (142.85 km/h) Nice, France Gobron-Brillié 'Paris-Madrid'
