= Kaiserpreis =

Grand Prix motor race

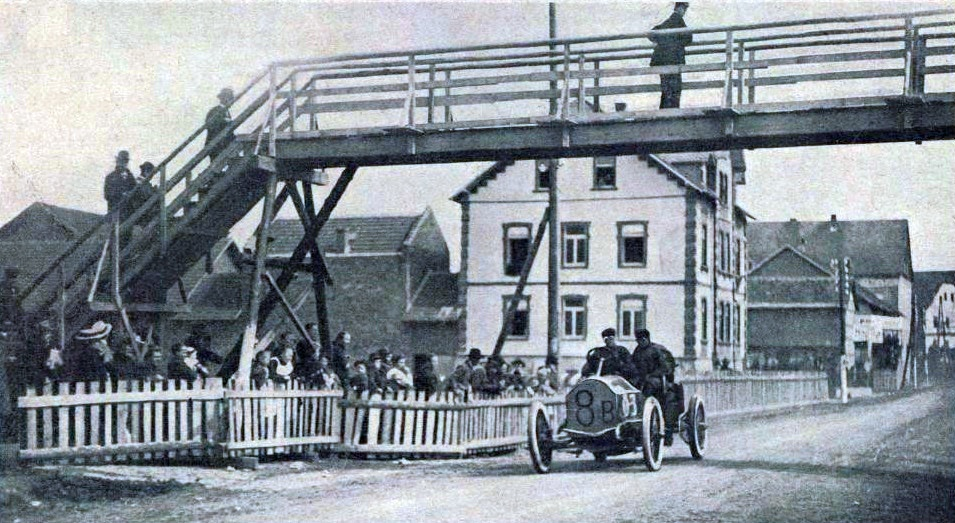
1907 Kaiserpreis.

The Kaiserpreis (German: Emperor's Prize) auto race, named after Emperor Wilhelm II, was a Grand Prix motor race held at Taunus on 13–14 June 1907. Like his brother's Prinz-Heinrich-Fahrt held from 1908 to 1911, it was a precursor to the German Grand Prix.

As Camille Jenatzy had won the Gordon Bennett Cup in auto racing in 1903 with a Mercedes, Germany had to stage the 1904 event. A 117 km (73 mi) long track in the Taunus mountains was selected, from Oberursel to Weilburg and back. The Cup was won by Léon Théry in a Richard-Brasier, and the Gordon Bennett race returned to France for 1905 and 1906, but was not continued as such in 1907, as Grand Prix motor racing evolved.

On the same track as the Gordon Bennett three years earlier, Germany staged its second large international event in 1907, the Kaiserpreis auto race (after sailing and rowing events were also named so). Entries were limited to touring cars with engines of less than eight litres. The race was won by Italian Felice Nazzaro in a Fiat 130 HP, against competition from Opel, Mercedes, Eisenach, Adler and others.

In 1908, the Prinz-Heinrich-Fahrt resumed until 1911.

== Results ==
=== Heat 1 ===
| Pos | No | Driver | Car | Laps | Time/Retired |
|---|---|---|---|---|---|
| 1 | 8B | (Italy) Vincenzo Lancia | Fiat 130 HP | 2 | 2h56m17 |
| 2 | 3A | (Germany) Friedrich Opel | Opel | 2 | 3h01m00 |
| 3 | 16A | (Belgium) Lucien Hautvast | Pipe | 2 | 3h02m56 |
| 4 | 19A | (Germany) P. Geller | Adler | 2 | 3h02m56 |
| 5 | 35A | (Italy) Alessandro Cagno | Itala | 2 | 3h07m26 |
| 6 | 37A | (Belgium) Hugo Wilhelm | Metallurgique | 2 | 3h08m05 |
| 7 | 3B | (Germany) Carl Jörns | Opel | 2 | 3h10m08 |
| 8 | 26A | (Germany) R. Schmidt | Eisenach | 2 | 3h11m39 |
| 9 | 14A | (Italy) Vincenzo Florio | Darracq | 2 | 3h11m50 |
| 10 | 7A | (France) Victor Hémery | Benz | 2 | 3h12m52 |
| 11 | 10A | (United Kingdom) Moore-Brabazon | Minerva | 2 | 3h14m56 |
| 12 | 13A | (France) Fernand Gabriel (Belgium) Arthur Duray | Lorraine-Dietrich | 2 | 3h16m01 |
| 13 | 15A | (Germany) Gerhard Adelberger | Protos | 2 | 3h34m20 |
| 14 | 6A | (France) Marc Jeannin | Sun | 2 | 3h35m18 |
| 15 | 40A | (Germany) Henze | Imperia | 2 | 3h37m43 |
| 16 | 31A | (France) Douet | Gobron-Brillié | 2 | 3h41m36 |
| 17 | 1A | (Germany) F. Schmidt | Dürkopp | 2 | 3h44m41 |
| 18 | 33A | (Italy) Gianmaria Tomaselli | Bianchi | 2 | 3h48m25 |
| 19 | 34A | (Belgium) Camille Jenatzy | Mercedes | 2 | 3h50m55 |
| 20 | 32A | (Germany) Beutler | Martini | 2 | 3h57m06 |
| 21 | 41A | (Germany) Saze | Gräf & Stift | 2 | 3h58m54 |
| 22 | 20A | (France) Ferey | Vinot | 2 | 3h59m52 |
| 23 | 22A | (Germany) Emil Mathis | Mathis | 2 | 4h03m17 |
| 24 | 23A | (Germany) Franz Kirchheim | Ehrhardt | 2 | 4h16m01 |
| 25 | 12A | (France) A. Lavergne | Mors | 2 | 4h28m25 |
| Ret | 1B | (Germany) Rudolf Oelerisch | Dürkopp | 1 | |
| Ret | 18A | (Germany) B. Buckner | Horch | 1 | |
| Ret | 4A | (Italy) Taddioli | Rebour | 1 | |
| Ret | 42A | (Germany) Carl Fritsch | NAG | 1 | |
| Ret | 5A | (Germany) Flohr | Argus | 0 | |
| Ret | 9A | (United Kingdom) "Alexander Burton" | Mercedes | 0 | |
| Ret | 11A | (France) A. Villemain | Martin-Lethimonnier | 0 | |
| Ret | 27A | (Italy) Vincenzo Trucco | Isotta Fraschini | 0 | |
| Ret | 28A | (Italy) Enrico Maggioni | Zust | 0 | |
| Ret | 29A | (United Kingdom) Oliver Bush | Daimler | 0 | |
| Ret | 30A | (France) Emile Stricker | Protos | 0 | |
| Ret | 36A | (Bohemia) Otto Hyeronymous | Gaggenau | 0 | |
| Ret | 7B | (Germany) Dietrich Spamann | Benz | 0 | |
| Ret | 39A | (United Kingdom) Lord Glentworth | Napier | 0 | |
| DNA | 17A | (Italy) Carlo Raggio | FLAG | | |
| DNA | 21A | (Germany) Wladin | Rochet-Schneider | | |
| DNA | 24A | (Germany) Boschis | Fiat Brevetti | | |
| DNA | 25A | (France) Leon Collinet | Ariès | | |
| DNA | 25B | (France) Jean Vallée | Ariès | | |
| DNA | 28B | (Italy) Marco Conti | Zust | | |
| DNA | 37C | (Belgium) Bussing | Metallurgique | | |
| DNA | 38A | (France) G. Busson | Lucia | | |
| | 7C | (Germany) Schulz | Benz | | Alternative driver |
| | 9B | (Austria-Hungary) Ferdinand Porsche | Mercedes | | Alternative driver |
| | 19C | (Germany) Christer Junk | Adler | | Alternative driver |
| | 42B | (Germany) R. Scholz | NAG | | Alternative driver |
| | 1C | (Austria-Hungary) Beneslav Jarosch | Dürkopp | | |

=== Heat 2 ===
| Pos | No | Driver | Car | Laps | Time/Retired |
|---|---|---|---|---|---|
| 1 | 8B | (Italy) Felice Nazzaro | Fiat 130 HP | 2 | 2h50m11 |
| 2 | 8C | (France) Louis Wagner | Fiat 130 HP | 2 | 2h56m55 |
| 3 | 16C | C.Deplus | Pipe | 2 | 3h01m45 |
| 4 | 13C | (Belgium) Arthur Duray | Lorraine-Dietrich | 2 | 3h09m45 |
| 5 | 34B | Willy Poege | Mercedes | 2 | 3h09m56 |
| 6 | 34C | (Germany) Otto Salzer | Mercedes | 2 | 3h11m37 |
| 7 | 35C | Maurice Fournier | Itala | 2 | 3h12m32 |
| 8 | 27B | (Italy) Ferdinando Minoia | Isotta Fraschini | 2 | 3h12m42 |
| 9 | 10C | (France) Albert Guyot | Minerva | 2 | 3h13m01 |
| 10 | 13B | (France) Henri Rougier | Lorraine-Dietrich | 2 | 3h13m27 |
| 11 | 35B | Maurice Fabry | Itala | 2 | 3h14m20 |
| 12 | 26B | Salmann | Eisenach | 2 | 3h14m21 |
| 13 | 3C | Michel | Opel | 2 | 3h19m05 |
| 14 | 29B | G.Ison | Daimler | 2 | 3h25m28 |
| 15 | 32B | Beck | Martini | 2 | 3h25m43 |
| 16 | 33B | (Italy) Carlo Maserati | Bianchi | 2 | 3h27m02 |
| 17 | 14C | Brauda | Darracq | 2 | 3h28m00 |
| 18 | 42B | W Salzer | NAG | 2 | 3h48m25 |
| 19 | 21B | Viton | Rochet-Schneider | 2 | 3h32m33 |
| 20 | 31B | F.Terry | Gobron-Brillie | 2 | 3h35m54 |
| Ret | 19C | Dietrich Goebel | Adler | 1 | |
| Ret | 23B | K.Beireis | Ehrhardt | 1 | |
| Ret | 7C | Clemente de Bojano | Benz | 1 | |
| Ret | 18B | H.Hoffmann | Horch | 1 | |
| Ret | 11B | Ducon | Martin-Lethimonnier | 0 | |
| Ret | 36B | David Lucke | Gaggenau | 0 | |
| Ret | 18C | Wilhelm Krapff | Horch | 0 | |
| Ret | 27C | Giuseppe Tamagni | Isotta-Fraschini | 0 | |
| Ret | 29C | Hodierne | Daimler | 0 | |
| Ret | 36C | Robl | Gaggenau | 0 | |
| Ret | 42C | H.Ernecke | NAG | 0 | |

=== Final ===
| Pos | No | Driver | Car | Laps | Time/Retired |
|---|---|---|---|---|---|
| 1 | 8B | Felice Nazzaro | Fiat 130 HP | 3 | 5h34m28.2 |
| 2 | 16A | Lucien Hautvast | Pipe | 3 | 5h39m12.4 |
| 3 | 3B | Carl Jorns | Opel | 3 | 5h39m51.0 |
| 4 | 3C | Michel | Opel | 3 | 5h49m36.8 |
| 5 | 8C | Louis Wagner | Fiat | 3 | 5h50m54.8 |
| 6 | 8A | Vincenzo Lancia | Fiat | 3 | 5h51m03.6 |
| 7 | 27B | Ferdinando Minoia | Isotta-Fraschini | 3 | 5h53m20.2 |
| 8 | 35C | Maurice Fournier | Itala | 3 | 5h53m20.2 |
| 9 | 34C | Otto Salzer | Mercedes | 3 | 5h57m34.8 |
| 10 | 35A | Alessandro Cagno | Itala | 3 | 5h59m14.0 |
| 11 | 26A | R.Schmidt | Eisenach | 3 | 6h03m32.2 |
| 12 | 32A | Beutler | Martini | 3 | 6h07m12.4 |
| 13 | 13B | Henri Rougier | Lorraine-Dietrich | 3 | 6h08m17.0 |
| 14 | 34A | Camille Jenatzy | Mercedes | 3 | 6h08m56.4 |
| 15 | 32B | Beck | Martini | 3 | 6h20m15.8 |
| 16 | 35B | Maurice Fabry | Itala | 3 | 6h28m59.6 |
| 17 | 33A | Gianmaria Tomaselli | Bianchi | 3 | 6h32m47.4 |
| 18 | 42B | W. Salzer | NAG | 3 | 6h35m34.4 |
| 19 | 1A | F.Schmidt | Dürkopp | 3 | 6h46m47.4 |
| 20 | 31B | F.Terry | Gobron-Brillie | 3 | 6h56m08.2 |
| 21 | 15A | Gerhard Adelberger | Protos | 3 | 7h13m10.0 |
| NC | 16C | C.Deplus | Pipe | 3 | |
| NC | 33B | Carlo Maserati | Bianchi | 3 | |
| NC | 21B | Viton | Rochet-Schneider | 3 | |
| NC | 40A | Henze | Imperia | 3 | |
| Ret | 31A | Douet | Gobron-Brillie | 2 | |
| Ret | 3A | Fritz von Opel | Opel | 2 | |
| Ret | 19A | P.Geller | Adler | 2 | |
| Ret | 26B | Salmann | Eisenach | 2 | |
| Ret | 7A | Victor Hemery | Benz | 1 | |
| Ret | 10C | Albert Guyot | Minerva | 1 | |
| Ret | 13C | Arthur Duray | Lorraine-Dietrich | 1 | |
| Ret | 14C | Brauda | Darracq | 1 | |
| Ret | 29B | G.Ison | Daimler | 1 | |
| Ret | 10A | Moore Brabazon | Minerva | 0 | |
| Ret | 13A | Fernand Gabriel Arthur Duray | Lorraine-Dietrich | 0 | |
| Ret | 14A | Vincenzo Florio | Darracq | 0 | |
| Ret | 34B | Willy Poege | Mercedes | 0 | |
| Ret | 37A | Hugo Wilhelm | Metallurgique | 0 | |
| DNS | 6A | Marc Jeannin | Sun | 0 | |
