= Prunus elaeagrifolia =

Scientific classification
- Kingdom: Plantae
- Clade: Tracheophytes
- Clade: Angiosperms
- Clade: Eudicots
- Clade: Rosids
- Order: Rosales
- Family: Rosaceae
- Genus: Prunus
- Species: P. elaeagrifolia

Binomial name
- Prunus elaeagrifolia (Spach) Fritsch

Synonyms
- Amygdalus elaeagrifolia Spach (basionym); Prunus elaeagnifolia (Spach) Fritsch (orth. var.); Prunus elaeagrifolia (Spach) A.E.Murray (isonym); Prunus elaeagnifolia (Spach) A.E.Murray (orth. var.); Amygdalus elaeagrifolia subsp. leiocarpa (Boiss.) Browicz; Amygdalus elaeagrifolia var. pubescens Browicz; Amygdalus leiocarpa Boiss.; Prunus leiocarpa (Boiss.) Fritsch; Prunus leiocarpa (Boiss.) Schneider

Species of wild almond from Iran

Prunus elaeagrifolia (Persian: ارژن) is a species of wild almond native to Iran. It is shrub or small tree 3-4 m tall, with the gray bark of its older twigs peeling in places and showing a brownish-yellow underbark. Its leaves are densely pubescent, with the pubescence yellowish gray. It is mostly found in the southern portion of the Zagros Mountains, where in places it is one of the dominant tree species. Its 2n=16 chromosomes have karyotypic formula 7m+t.

== Taxonomy ==
The species was first described by Édouard Spach in 1843 as Amygdalus elaeagrifolia. Spach repeated this spelling of the epithet in Jaubert's Illustrationes plantarum orientalium, which he helped to edit. The epithet appears to be derived from elaeagros, the wild olive, and thus means 'wild olive-leaved'. Subsequent writers seem to have thought he had made a typographic error, and so wrongly "corrected" the epithet to elaeagnifolia, meaning 'with leaves like Elaeagnus'.

In 1892, Karl Fritsch transferred the species from Amygdalus to Prunus, spelling the epithet as "elaeagnifolia" rather than Spach's elaeagrifolia. As of October 2021, some sources have followed Fritsch, calling the species Prunus "elaeagnifolia" rather than Prunus elaeagrifolia, whereas the International Plant Names Index supported the use of elaeagrifolia.
