= Scintilla =

Scintilla (the Italian and Latin word for spark) may refer to:

- Scintilla AG, a Swiss electrical engineering company, a 100 percent subsidiary of Robert Bosch GmbH since 2005
- Scintilla (comics), a fictional character in the Marvel Universe
- Scintilla (communist group), a clandestine 1940s Italian anti-fascist network
- Scintilla Magneto Company, an American manufacturer of magnetos
- Scintilla (software), a software library for code editors
- Scintilla (trilobite), a genus in family Anomocaridae
- The Hybrid (film), a 2014 British film also known as Scintilla
- The Civetta Scintilla, a parody of the Ferrari F8 Tributo, appears in the game BeamNG.drive
