= Fiat 130 HP =

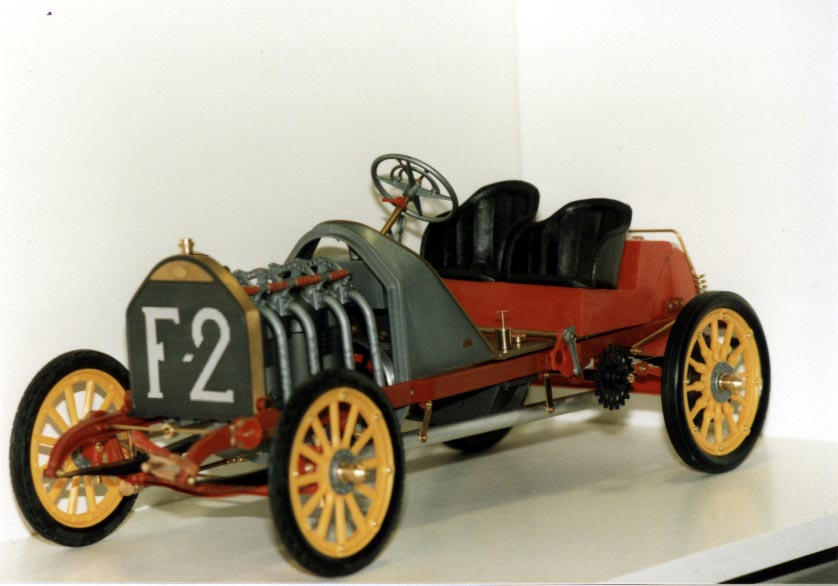
- 1907 Fiat 130 HP Grand Prix racer

Overview
- Manufacturer: Fiat
- Production: 1907
- Designer: Giovanni Enrico

Body and chassis
- Class: Grand Prix motor racing
- Body style: 2-door Tandem-seating racer
- Layout: Front-engine design

Powertrain
- Engine: 16,286 cubic centimetres (993.8 cu in; 16.3 L) OHV Hemi; 130 HP; 4-Cylinder in-line twin block
- Transmission: Chain driven

Chronology
- Predecessor: Fiat 28-40 HP
- Successor: Fiat SB4

The Fiat 130 HP is a Grand Prix racing car made by Fiat in 1907 to a design by Giovanni Enrico. Built solely for Grand Prix motor racing, the Fiat 130 HP included new design features, such as overhead valves and hemispherical compression chambers.

== Background ==
Prior to 1906, Fiat had only experienced limited success on the racing circuit owing to their use of less powerful cars. The most successful of these models was the 28/40HP Corsa, which provided a maximum of 40 hp. Another successful design was the 60 horsepower Fiat 60 HP. The manufacturer lacked a high powered engine compared to the French who dominated the circuit at that time with the Renault AK 90CV, which featured a 90 hp engine. By 1907, a new formula was introduced to govern Grand Prix motor racing which allowed for cars with larger and heavier engines to compete. The new regulations included changes to fuel consumption (a maximum of 30 liters per 100 km/9.42 mpg) and eliminated the weight and displacement limits. Fiat chose to develop a new race car designed to the new standards and featured an engine which could generate 130 hp.

== Technical data ==
The project was entrusted to John Henry as the project manager who had previously worked as a co-designer on an earlier 100 horsepower racer in 1905. He developed the 130 HP while working with designer Giovanni Enrico and technical directors Guido Fornaca and Carlo Cavalli. The new design featured a chain final drive and a front-mounted 4-cylinder, 16,286 cubic centimetres (993.8 cu in; 16.3 L) engine. The new engine incorporated multiple innovations for its time, including an oversquare bore greater than the stroke, overhead valves, hemispherical combustion chambers and centrally located spark plugs.

The ignition for the 130 HP was provided by a Simms-Bosch magneto, while the power was controlled by a single carburetor. Despite the weight of more than 1000 kg (each piston had a weight of 4.5 kg) the wheels were still made of wood.

== Racing results ==
The car performed well during the Targa Florio (First race of the season), which was won by Felice Nazzaro followed by Vincenzo Lancia who came in second place.

Nazzaro also won the Kaiserpreis that took place on the Taunus circuit. The other two cars which Fiat entrusted to Lancia and Louis Wagner finished fifth and sixth respectively.

The team of Nazzaro, Wagner and Lancia was deployed to the 1907 French Grand Prix that took place in Dieppe. During the first 3 laps, Wagner kept the lead, but because of a fault he had to withdraw from the race. Lancia briefly took the lead but owing to engine trouble, he also retired. The race was eventually won by Nazzaro.
