= Steiger (automobile company) =

German automobile manufacturer

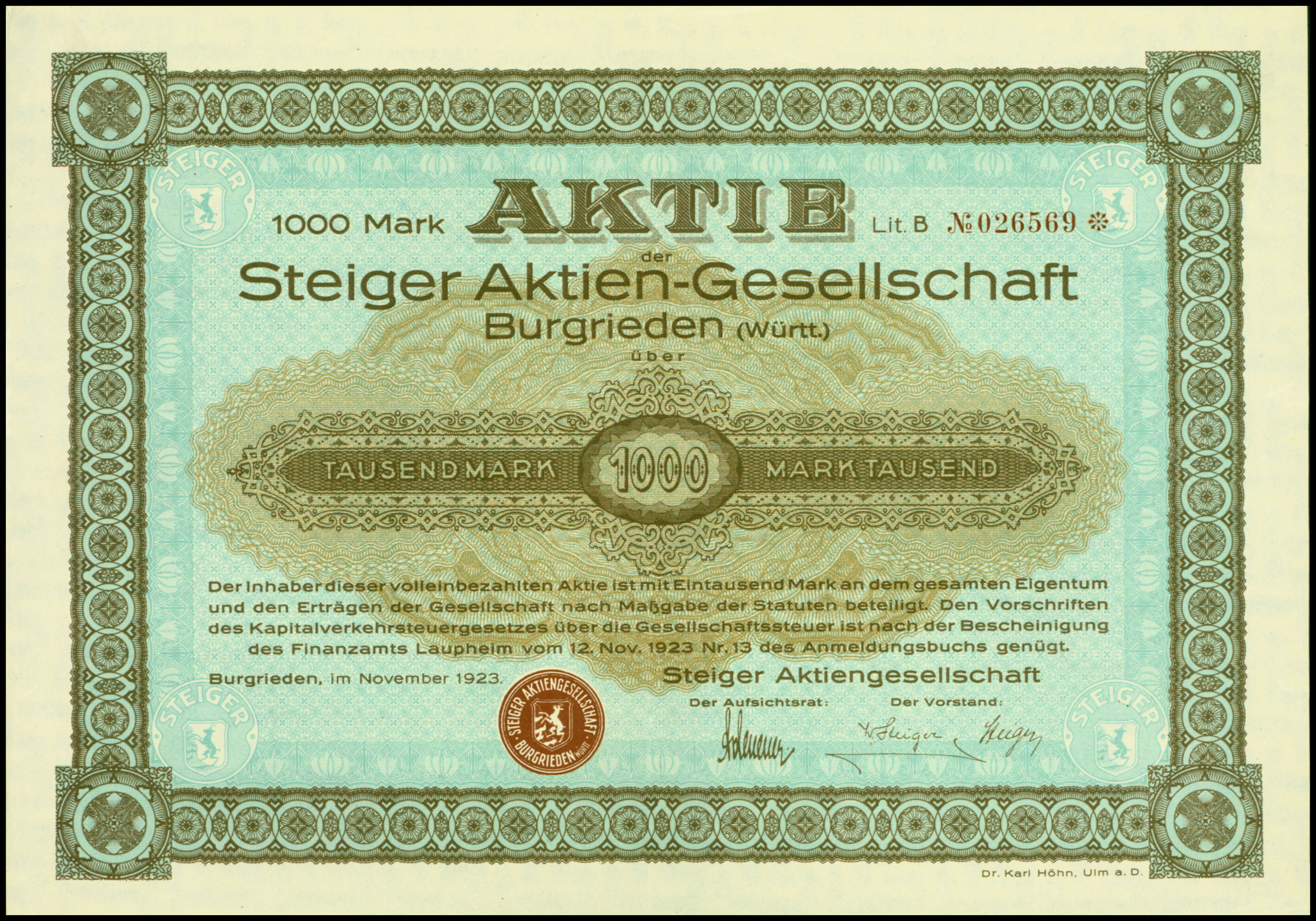
Share of the Steiger AG, issued November 1923

The Steiger company was founded in 1914 as Maschinenfabrik (engine manufactory) Walther Steiger & Co. by the Swiss engineer Walther Steiger (1881–1943) in Burgrieden near Ulm, Germany. In 1921 it became a limited company (Steiger AG). During its short life the firm produced circa 1,200 vehicles.

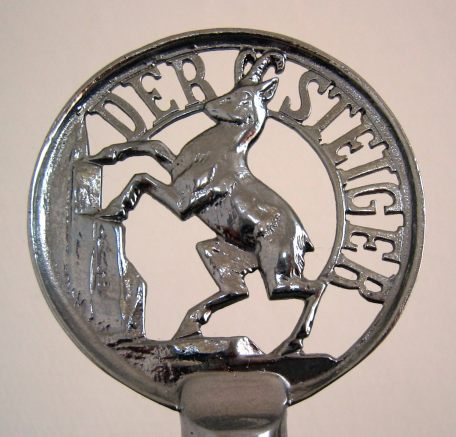
Steiger radiator emblem

== Founding and Early History ==
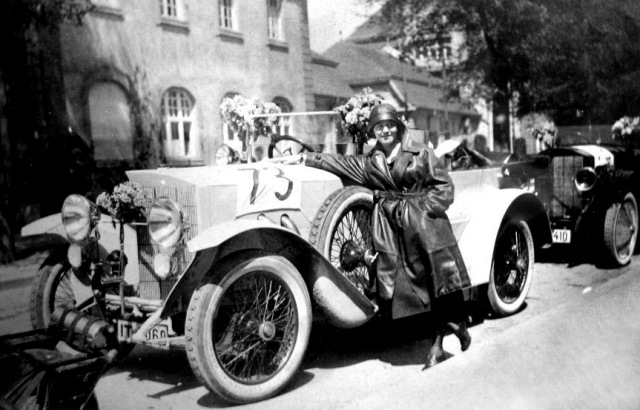
Steiger 10/50 PS touring car (1922)

During World War I the Steiger firm repaired aeroplanes and aeroplane engines. In 1917 the owner and his engineer, Paul Henze, began to work on motorized vehicles. Plans for the manufacture of tractors were abandoned in favour of automobiles; their first model, the Steiger 10/50 PS, was produced in 1920. This touring model with a 2.6-litre four cylinder engine (50 hp / 37 kW) became Steiger's most significant product and was still in production when the firm collapsed in 1926. Its modern OHC engine was distinctive because of an overhead camshaft driven by spiral-toothed bevel gear wheels. These cars, with 'u' shaped pressed steel frames, two axles with leaf spring suspension, and a pointed radiator, were considered to be "the most significant technical innovation of the early 1920s" and "the most progressive German serially-produced cars of their time".

== A brief flowering ==
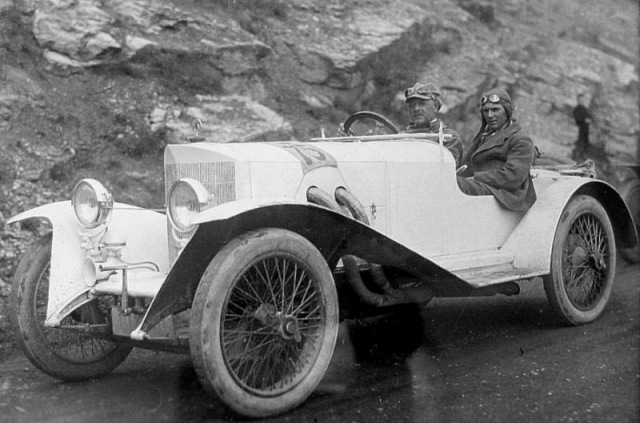
Walther Steiger driving a Steiger "Sport" 11/55 PS (1922)

In 1922 Steiger produced a two-seated roadster with a larger engine (cubic capacity 2.8 litres, 55 hp / 40 kW) that became available in 1924 as an even more powerful model (cubic capacity 2.9 litres, 70 hp / 51 kW). These types reached a maximum speed of 140 km/h (88 mph) (100 hp racing models could reach a speed of 180 km/h (113 mph)) and cost 18,000 Reichsmarks. Those high-performance sports and racing models were very successful at racing events (Solituderennen, Avus, Eifelrennen, Klausenrennen, Monza and Targa Florio) in the 1920s. The more powerful touring car, the Steiger 11/55 PS, arrived in 1925 with an extended wheelbase and the first sports car's engine.

In the early 1920s, the Steiger company even had a sales office in the USA. The address in Manhattan: "Steiger Motor Car Co., Inc." - 134 W 52nd St, New York City.

At its peak the firm occupied up to 500 workers and employees. Despite their high-class products that were often compared with those of Bugatti, the firm went bankrupt in the wake of the 1926 automobile crisis.

== Steiger-Martini ==
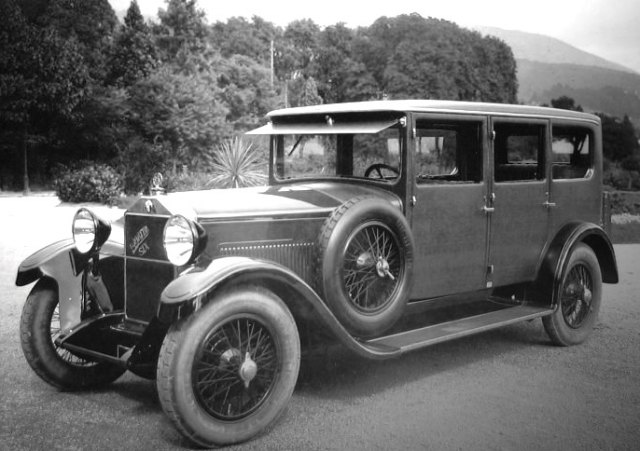
Martini-Six. Pullman (1927).

After the liquidation of his firm, Walther Steiger joined the Swiss automobile manufacturer Martini where he and his brother Robert had been the major shareholders since 1924. They produced a number of vehicles for Martini, including a 95 hp (70 kW) six-cylinder model. This luxury vehicle with a 4.4-litre engine appeared in Switzerland as Martini-Six and in Germany as 17/100 PS Steiger-Martini.

Following the pattern at Steiger, a number of different racing models were developed, and some achieved spectacular successes (twice reaching the first four in the 1929 Klausenpass race, for example). However, these carefully and individually manufactured models could not compete in the long run with cheaper, mass-produced vehicles from Germany, France and America. The end of a brand steeped in tradition was inevitable: on 12 June 1934 the last Martini left the factory in Saint-Blaise on Lake Neuchâtel.

== Steiger models ==
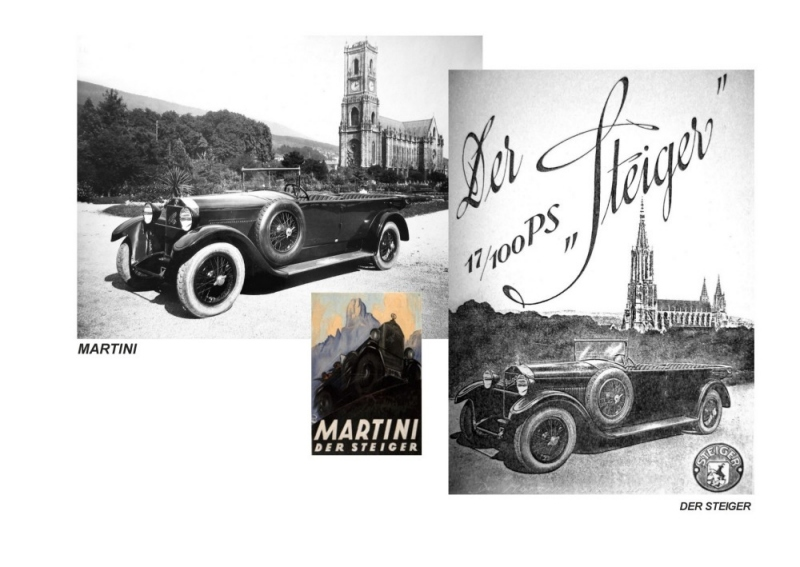
Martini-Six (CH) – 17/100 PS Steiger-Martini (GER)

Type	Production	Engine	Displacement	hp	Top speed
Steiger 10/50 PS	1920–1926	4 R / OHC	2604 cc	50 hp (37 kW)	95 km/h (60 mph)
Steiger Sport 11/55 PS	1922–1924	4 R / OHC	2826 cc	55 hp (40 kW)	128 km/h (81 mph)
Steiger Sport 12/70 PS	1924–1926	4 R / OHC	2902 cc	70 hp (51 kW)	140 km/h (88 mph)
Steiger 11/55 PS	1925–1926	4 R / OHC	2826 cc	55 hp (40 kW)	100 km/h (63 mph)

== See also ==
- Martini (automobile company) – Saint-Blaise, Switzerland
- auto motor und sport-TV: "Die faszinierendsten Autos der Welt – Klassiker", DVD (2002), EAN 4-260000-950484, Youtube: yy-3BHWqXkI
- ARD "Rasthaus" 1999 (German TV) "Der fast vergessene Steiger", Youtube: 4dEkE5hlXek

== Pictures ==
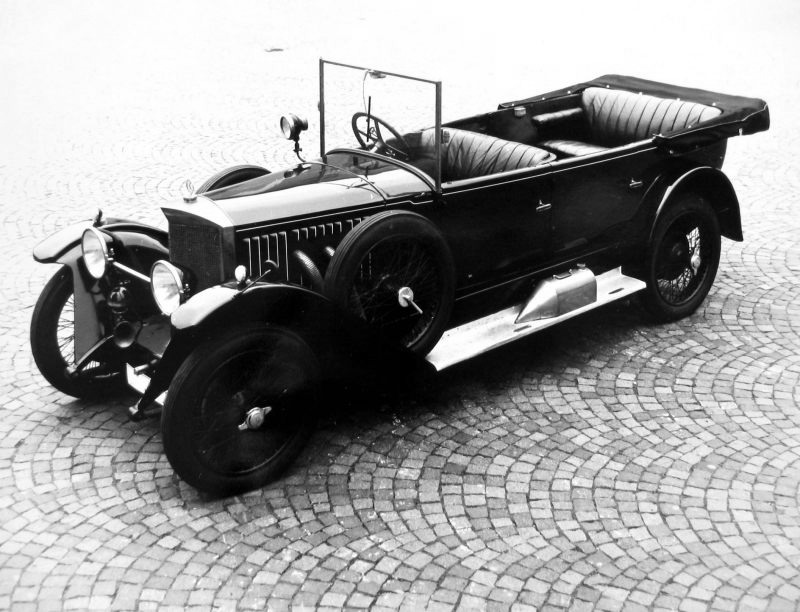
The last one: Steiger 11/55 PS

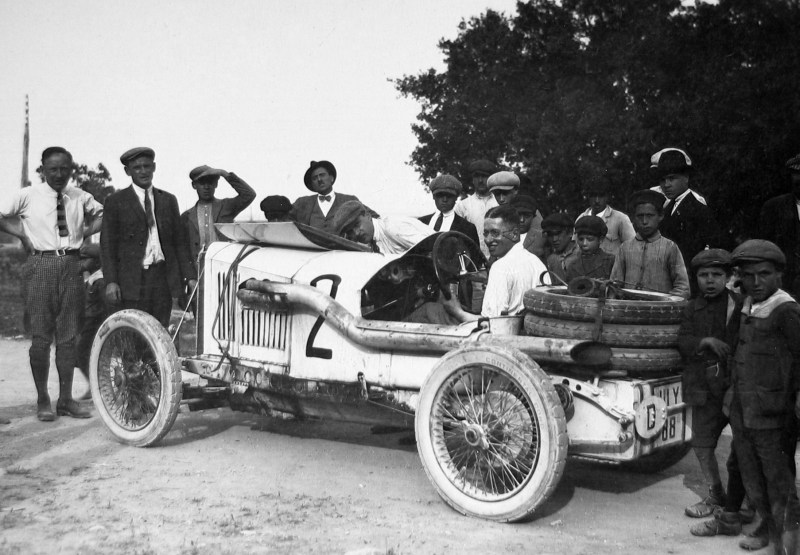
Steiger engineer Walter Kaufmann on Steiger racing car, type Targa-Florio (1924)

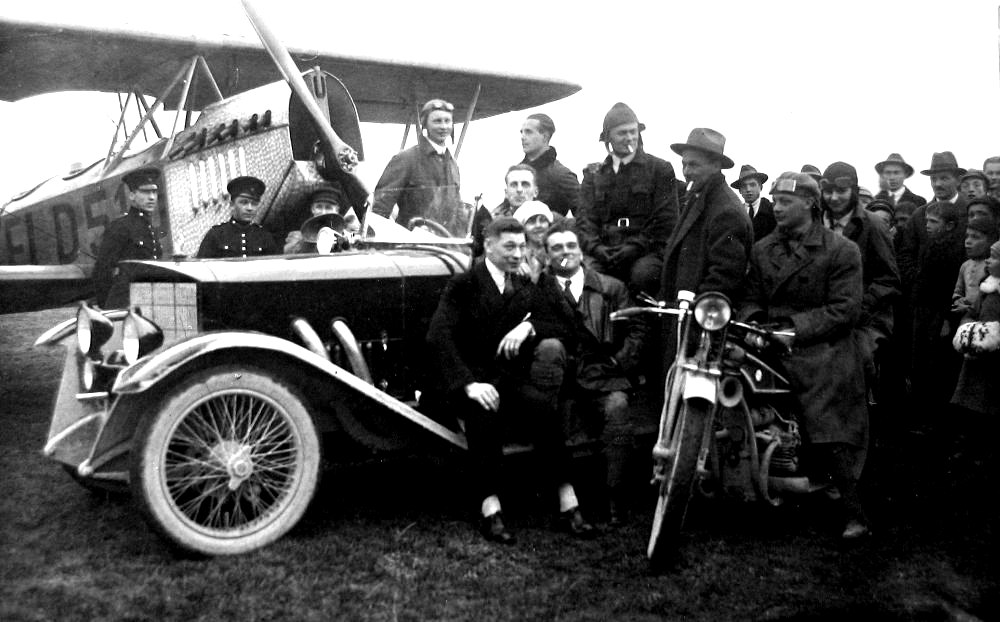
Eye catcher – Steiger 10/50 PS

== Sources ==
- Hans-Heinrich v. Fersen (1): Autos in Deutschland 1920–1939. Stuttgart 1964.
- Hans-Heinrich v. Fersen, a.o. (2): Klassische Wagen 1919–1939. Cologne 1994, ISBN 3-8228-8944-X
- Ferdinand Hediger: Oldtimer – Interessante Automobile von 1885–1939. Berne 1982, ISBN 3-444-50134-X
- Helmut and Uta Jung: Stuttgarter Karosseriewerk Reutter. Bielefeld 2006, ISBN 3-7688-1829-2
- Ralf J.F. Kieselbach and Hans-Erhard Lessing: Faszination der Form – Automobildesign in Baden-Württemberg. Stuttgart, Weimar 2002, ISBN 3-476-01825-3
- Werner Oswald: Deutsche Autos 1920–1945. Stuttgart 1982, ISBN 3-87943-519-7
- Michael Schick: Steiger – Die Geschichte einer schwäbischen Autofabrik in den 20er Jahren. Laupheim 1999, ISBN 3-00-003913-9
