= Martini (automobile company) =

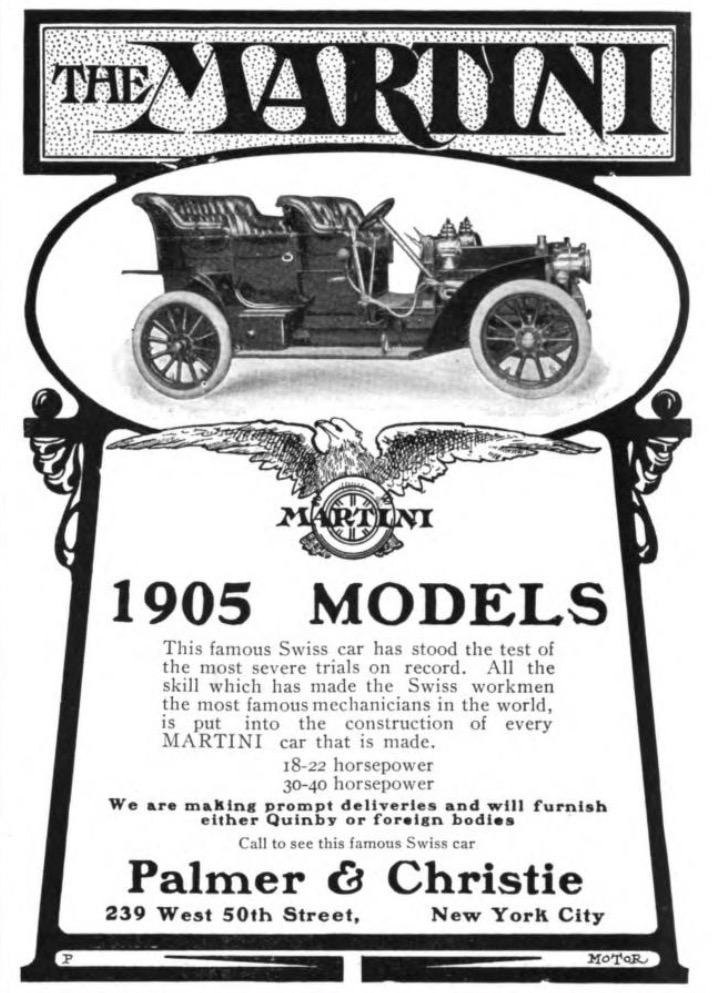
Martini 30-40 hp (1905)

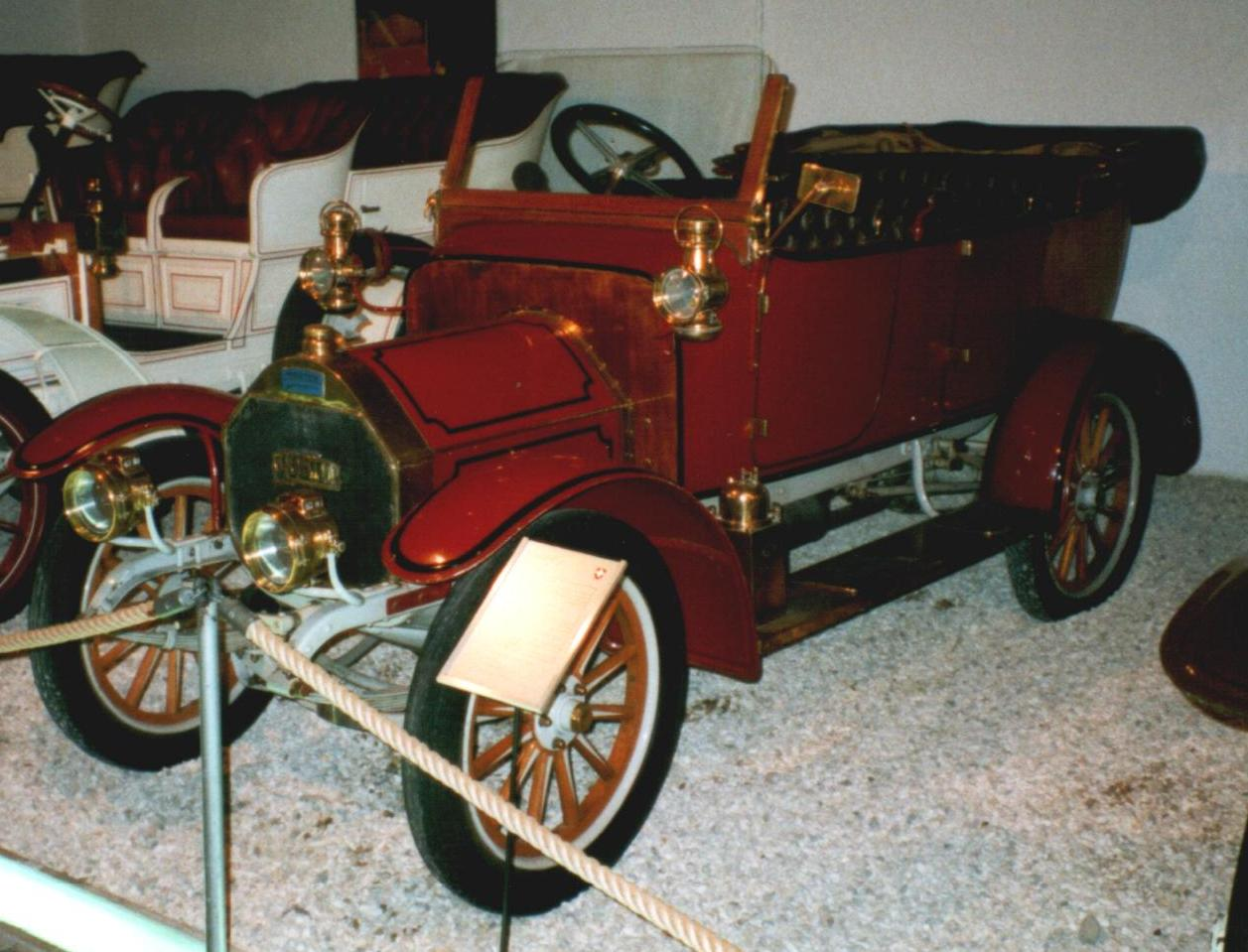
1912 Martini GA.

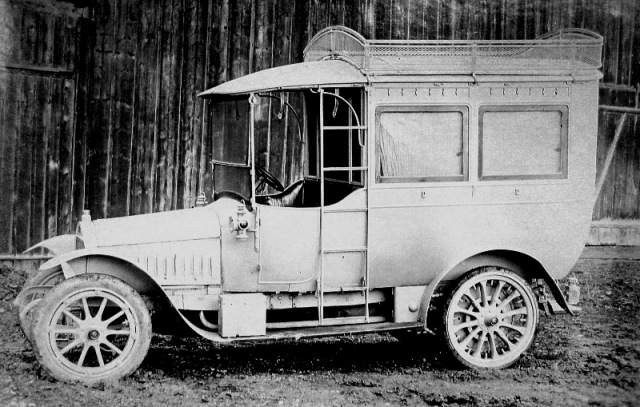
Martini Camionette from approximately 1907.

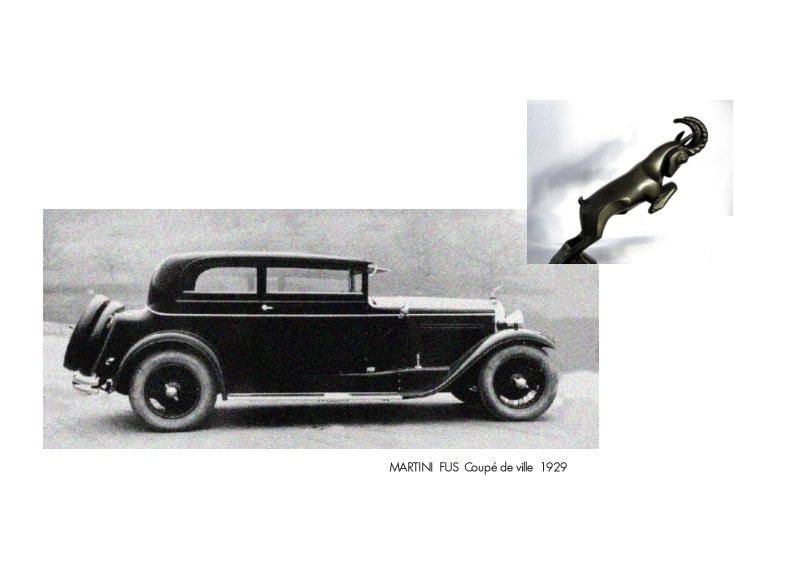
1929 Martini FUS Coupé.

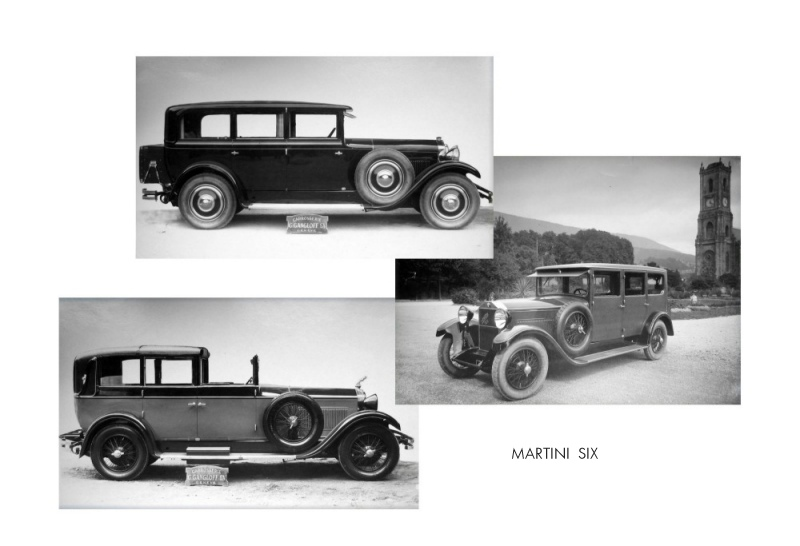
Martini-Six variants.

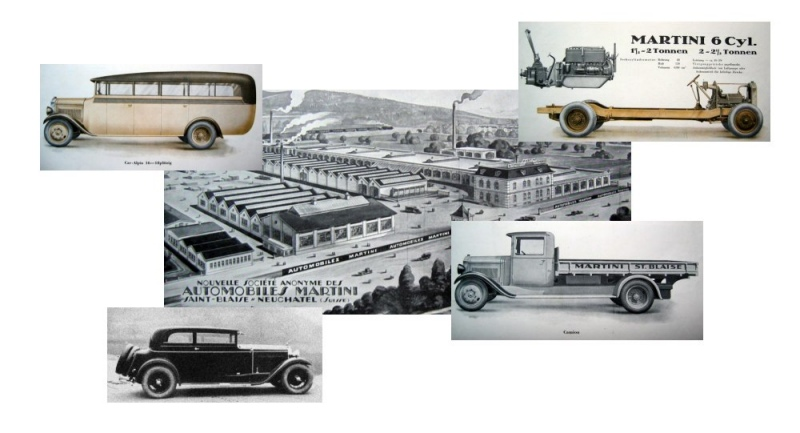
Various Martini models.

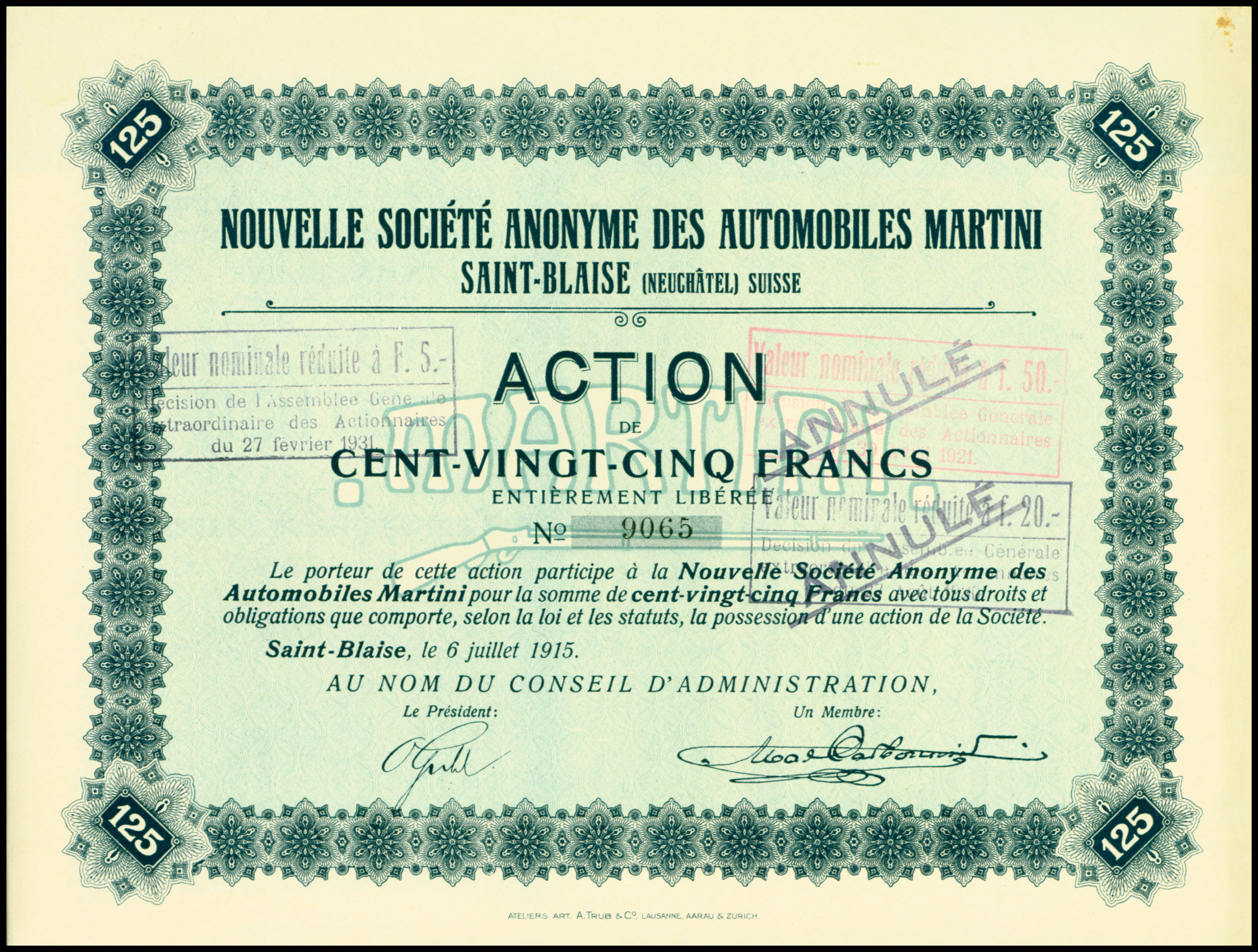
Share of the Nouvelle SA des Automobiles Martini, issued 6. July 1915

Martini was a pioneer Swiss automobile manufacturer, in operation 1897 to 1934.

== History ==
=== The beginning ===
In 1897, Swiss businessman Adolf von Martini, son of Friedrich von Martini, the inventor of the action used in the Martini–Henry rifle, built an experimental rear-engined car. He followed this with V4 cars of 10 hp (7.5 kW) and 16 hp (12 kW) in 1902. Since Swiss cantons were unusually hostile to cars, the company had to rely more than most on exports, and demand from abroad proved sufficient to justify building a factory in Saint-Blaise in 1904; von Martini relied on a licence from Rochet-Schneider of France, using an armored wood chassis and mechanically operated valves.

Promptly, his British sales agent, Captain H. H. P. Deasy, set off in a 16 hp on a 2,000-mile (3,200 km) trek through the Alps, which followed his earlier stunt of driving a cog-wheeled Martini up a mountain railway; his praise in both cases was effusive. By 1906, Deasy was the sole salesman. That summer, with a 20 hp and a four-cylinder 40 hp available, Deasy made an ill-advised challenge to Rolls-Royce (which had a six-cylinder engine); Deasy, and (more importantly) Martini lost the 4,000-mile (6,400 km) "Battle of the Cylinders".

For 1907, there was also a chain driven 28 hp, and an entry in the Kaiserpreis rally, where the marque placed thirteenth and fifteenth. In 1908, showing the rapid pace of change, shaft drive was standard, in 12 hp, 16 hp and 20 hp models (all still four-cylinder engines, however). That year's Coupe de Voiturettes saw 1086-cc (66 ci) inlet-over-exhaust SOHC-engined Martinis seventh, eighth, and tenth, enough for the team victory.

The racer was marketed as a 1909 road car, the 10/12, and new monobloc construction was standard across the line. Yet the engineers could not make up their minds; in 1910, they reverted to side valves, and in 1913 switched to sleeve valves for the 25/35. The marque's last racing attempt in 1913 used an overhead camshaft engine with four 85 x 132 mm cylinders, hemispherical combustion chambers and four valves per cylinder. It was known as the '15 Sport' and a regular competitor at hillclimbing events.

The years leading up to the World War were Martini's best, with annual production hovering around 600 cars, placing the company at the head of the Swiss automobile industry. While foreign manufacturers were already making inroads, the war years kept Martini in the black as they delivered large numbers of vehicles to the Swiss Army.

=== Inter-war era ===
The post-war recession, however, crippled Swiss exports including those of Martini. Martini was one of a very few manufacturers to restart production, with a mildly warmed over pre-war design as the TF 15/45 PS. A conventional four-cylinder of 3.6 litres displacement, it was wholly outdated in spite of a high standard of finish, with sales beginning at a low pace and then steadily sinking. Swiss manufacturers, with only a tiny domestic market, had been heavily export-dependent but external markets vanished in the harsh economic climate of the early 1920s. In June 1924 the nearly bankrupt Martini company was taken over by the Steiger brothers of Burgrieden, Germany. The Steigers relocated to Switzerland, having seen the writing on the wall for their German company which closed down in 1926, forcing the Steigers to sell their home to satisfy the creditors. The old TF soldiered on until 1925, but at the 1926 Geneva Motor Show Walther Steiger was able to show the new Martini-Steiger FU six-cylinder car. This had a side-valve engine of 3.1 litres and was a fully modern automobile albeit without any technical advances. It entered production in 1927, along with the larger (4.4 litres) FUS model. While sold as the "Martini Six" at home, the "Steiger" (meaning "Climber", suitably enough for a Swiss car) part of the name was emphasized in export markets where it was the "Steiger-Martini." Steiger's Alpine Chamois buck was incorporated into the logo and was also used as a hood ornament.

The Martini Six, while of a mainstream design, maintained Martini's high quality and workmanship standards and was an accordingly expensive car. Only a few hundred were built from 1927 until 1930, with the lion's share being sold at home in Switzerland. The FU and the FUG engine shared a 120 mm (4.7 in), with a 74 mm (2.9 in) or an 84 mm (3.3 in) bore for the smaller and larger engine, respectively. Power outputs were 55 and 90 PS (40 and 66 kW) at 3000 and 3200 rpm. The larger version proved considerably more popular and a series of revisions beginning in 1929 was mainly applied to the 4.4-litre version. The updated versions were sold as the Martini FUS and FN (and the smaller-engined FUN) with various improvements. Already in 1929 the updated FUS gained a four-speed gearbox, all-wheel brakes, and twin Zenith carburettors. In 1931 the FUN and FN versions were discontinued, but next year's NF model was a modernized version of the earlier FN.

During the Great Depression it quickly became clear to Martini that their existing six-cylinder cars were too expensive for the times. Accordingly, Martini signed a contract with Wanderer in 1930 to license build their recently updated Wanderer W11 six-cylinder car, a lighter, smaller, and cheaper proposition. This was badged Martini KM but it did not sell as well as hoped, likely the result of being a rather heavy car with low peak power and a weak chassis. The KM differed from the W11 only in minor details such as a marginally longer wheelbase and larger tread, altered gearing, and by using Scintilla lights and magneto rather than Bosch ones. The KM was likely intended only as a stopgap vehicle, as Walther Steiger had charged his old friend and engineer Paul Henze to develop an all-new front-wheel-drive car. This design, however, barely even reached the drawing boards as a result of the financial state of Martini - and that of the world.

The larger FUS was built alongside the KM until the smaller car was discontinued in 1932. This was also when the updated 4.4-liter NF was presented. Derived from the FU it offered many technological advances such as a worm drive rear axle, a fully synchronized gearbox, hydraulic shock absorbers and hydraulic four-wheel brakes, as well as modern styling thanks to a low-slung chassis. This, however, was not enough to save the company. The 95 PS (70 kW) NF soldiered on until 1934 before just fading away, Martini with it.

=== Post-automobile history ===
The Martini company also manufactured bookbinding machinery. They were purchased by Hans Müller and the company was renamed to Müller Martini. The original factory is still in use today, and has a 1917 Martini car on display in the lobby of their Bookbinding Academy.

== See also ==
- Adem (1912 car)
