= Carl Jörns =

German racing driver (1875–1969)

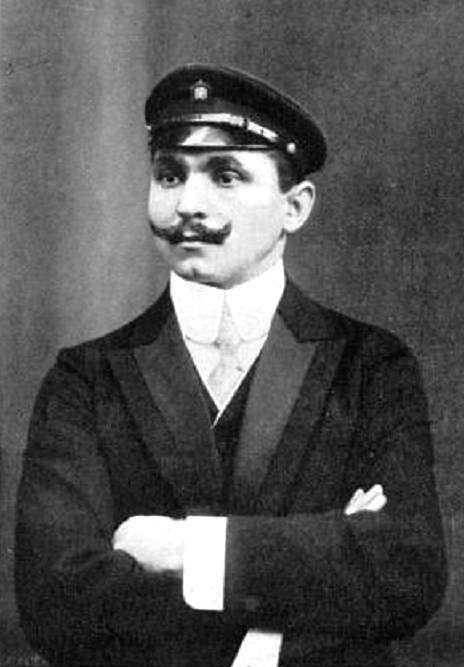

Personal information
- Full name: Carl Jörns
- Nationality: German
- Born: 11 December 1875 Ludwigshafen
- Died: 19 July 1969 (aged 93) Rüsselsheim am Main

Sport
- Country: Germany
- Sport: Auto racing and Cycling

Carl Jörns (December 11, 1875 – July 19, 1969) was a German race car driver.

== Information ==
Little is known of Jörns' early life. He started out as a cyclist and became connected with the Opel family, who ran the Opel sewing machine and bicycle company. He won his first bicycle race in 1893. As the Opel company started to expand into automobile manufacturing, he became a driver for Opel's racing team. He retired from cycling in 1900, after winning 300 races.

He started his auto racing career in August 1903. He raced Opel single-seater vehicles. He picked up his first victory in 1904. He came in third place at the 1907 Kaiserpreis and won on April 28, 1907, in Wartberg. In 1908, he won the first Zbraslav–Jíloviště plant in Czechoslovakia and won the 1908 Course de côte de Château-Thierry. He was involved in a collision with Ferenc Szisz in 1908, that ended Szisz's career. He finished 6th in the 1908 French Grand Prix. and won on July 19, 1909, in Pont de Bainethun In 1910, he won at Gilly-Burtigny in Geneva on September 25. He then won two races on the same day on July 20, 1911, winning at Pont de Bainethun and Mont Lombert. He came in 3rd on April 13, 1913, at the 1913 Zbraslav–Jíloviště plant. Jörns stopped racing prior to World War I due to internment concerns.

He retired from racing 1926, after a 24-year career with 288 podium finishes. After retiring, he assisted with preserving historic Opel race cars. He was later awarded the Order of Merit of the Federal Republic of Germany. Opel later published a book on Jörns in 1995, entitled "Carl Jörns: eine Motorsport-Karriere".
