= Fiat 28-40 HP =

Grand Prix racing car manufactured by Fiat in 1906 and 1907

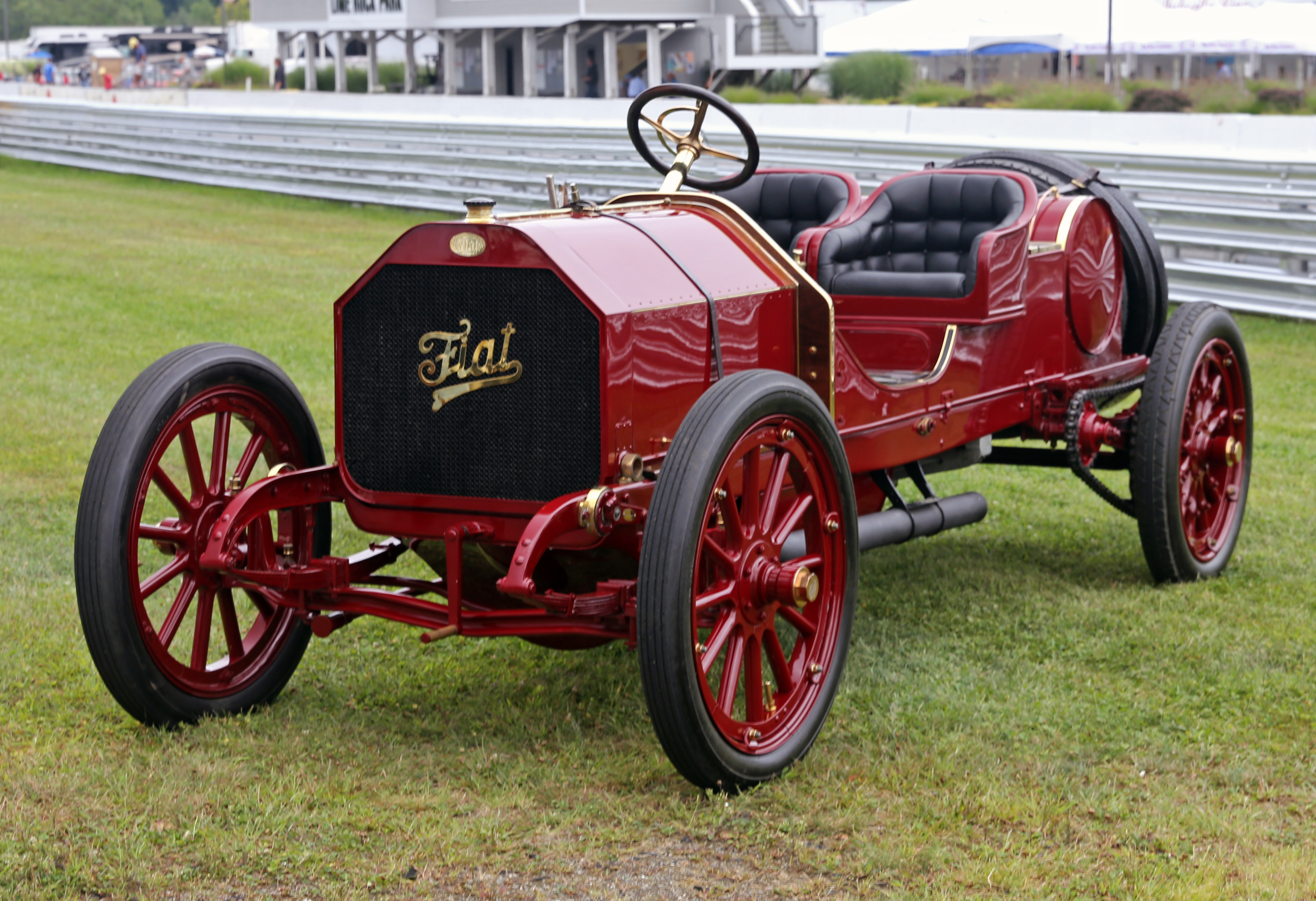
- Fiat 28-40 HP Targa Florio Corsa

Overview
- Manufacturer: Fiat
- Production: 1906-1910; 557 units of various models

Body and chassis
- Class: Grand Prix motor racing
- Body style: 2-door Tandem-seating racer
- Layout: Front-engine design

Powertrain
- Engine: 7357 cc 40 HP; 4-Cylinder in-line
- Transmission: Manual, 4-speed Chain driven

Dimensions
- Wheelbase: 3210 mm (126.4 in)
- Length: 4420 mm (174.0 in)
- Width: 1750 mm (68.9 in)
- Curb weight: 1200 kg (2,645.5 lbs)

Chronology
- Predecessor: Fiat 24-32 HP (Road Car); Fiat 75 HP (Race Car)
- Successor: Fiat 15 (Road Car); Fiat 130 HP

The Fiat 28-40 HP, also known as the Fiat Targa Florio Corsa, is a Grand Prix racing car manufactured by Fiat in 1906 and 1907. From 1907 through 1910, the design evolved into commercial production vehicles, including cars, light trucks, and buses.

== Background ==
The Fiat 28-40 HP was developed from the Fiat 24-32 HP which was designed and manufactured in 1903. The redesign included lightening the frame, increasing the power of the engine, and incorporating a water-cooled brake system to address overheating issues.

The design was begun as a race car and won several races in 1906 and 1907. A total of five cars were built to this purpose. The manufacturer then expanded the line to include passenger cars as sedans and coupes. The sturdiness of the chassis, coupled with the use of proven and existing technologies, led Fiat to select it as a base for its first line of commercial light trucks and buses. The autobus version was capable of carrying 14 passengers. A total of 557 vehicles were built in various configurations.

== Racing results ==
In 1906, Emile Mathis won the Golden Cup in the Herkomer rally, while Vincenzo Lancia won the Gold Cup in Milan. Emile Salmson won the 322-mile race between Gothenburg and Stockholm in this vehicle in 1908. This was a winter race over snow and ice-covered roads, which he completed in 23 hours, 42 minutes - more than four hours ahead of the second place vehicle.

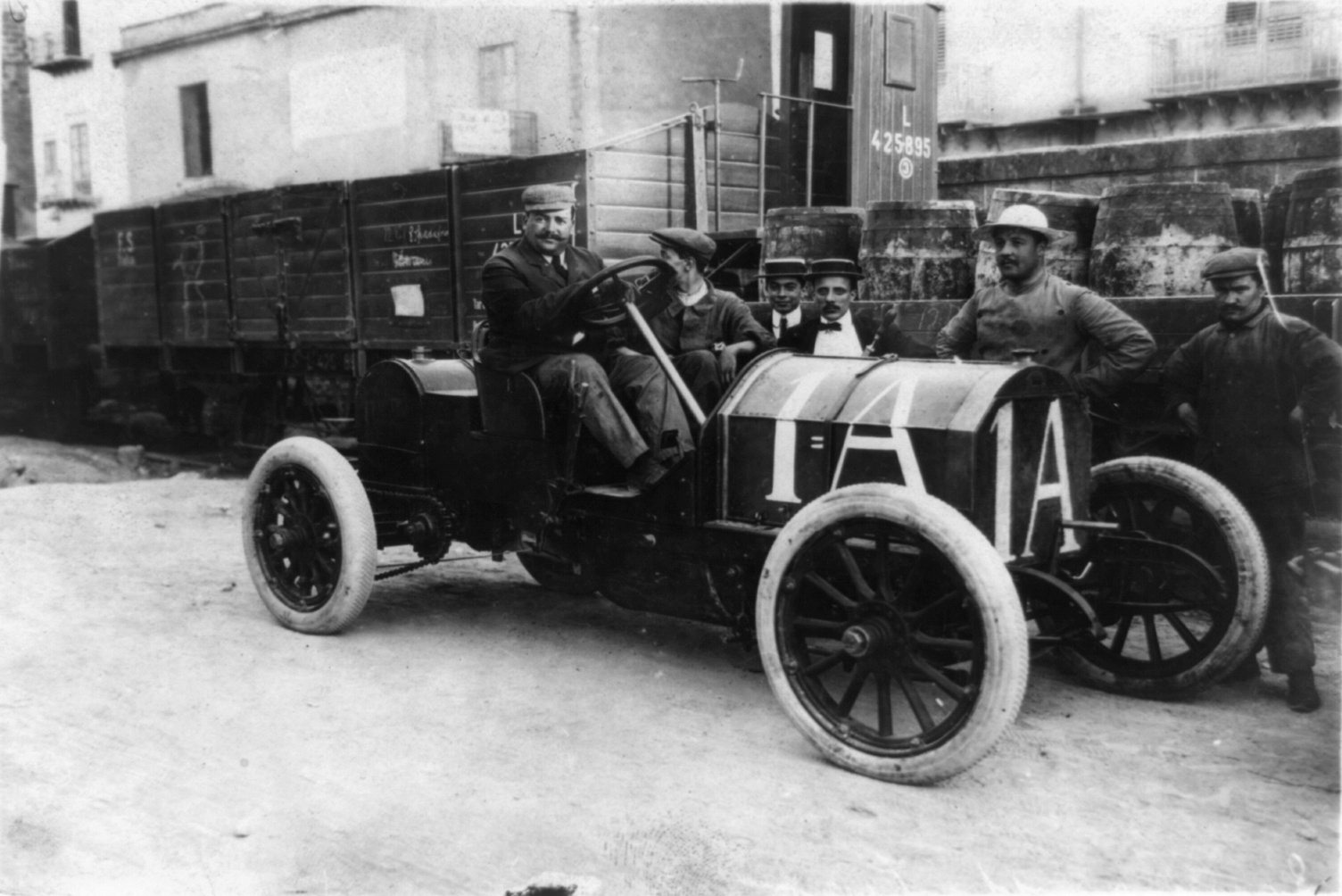
Vincenzo Lancia in a Fiat Targa Florio of 1908
