= Prinz-Heinrich-Fahrt =

Multi day long distance motorcar contest

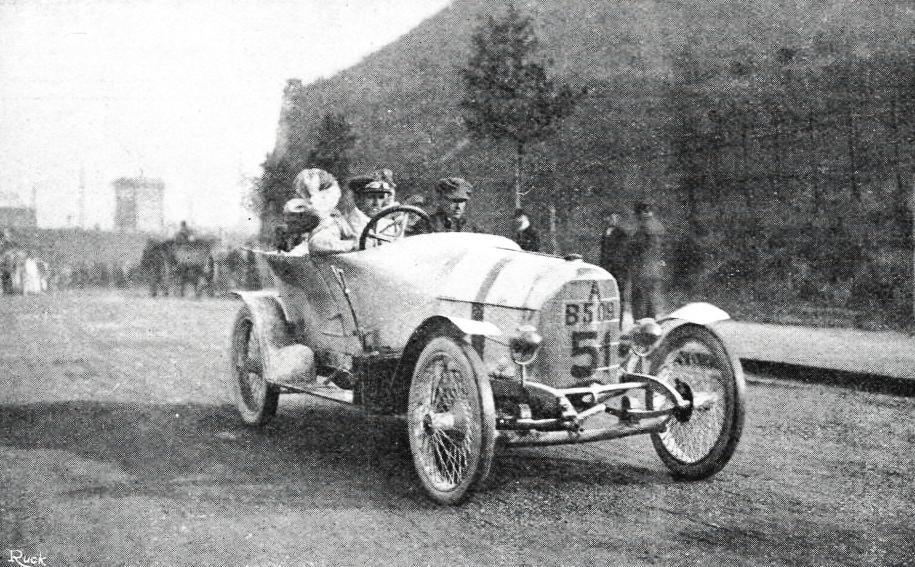
Ferdinand Porsche, winner of the Prinz-Heinrich-Fahrt in June 1910 with an Austro-Daimler

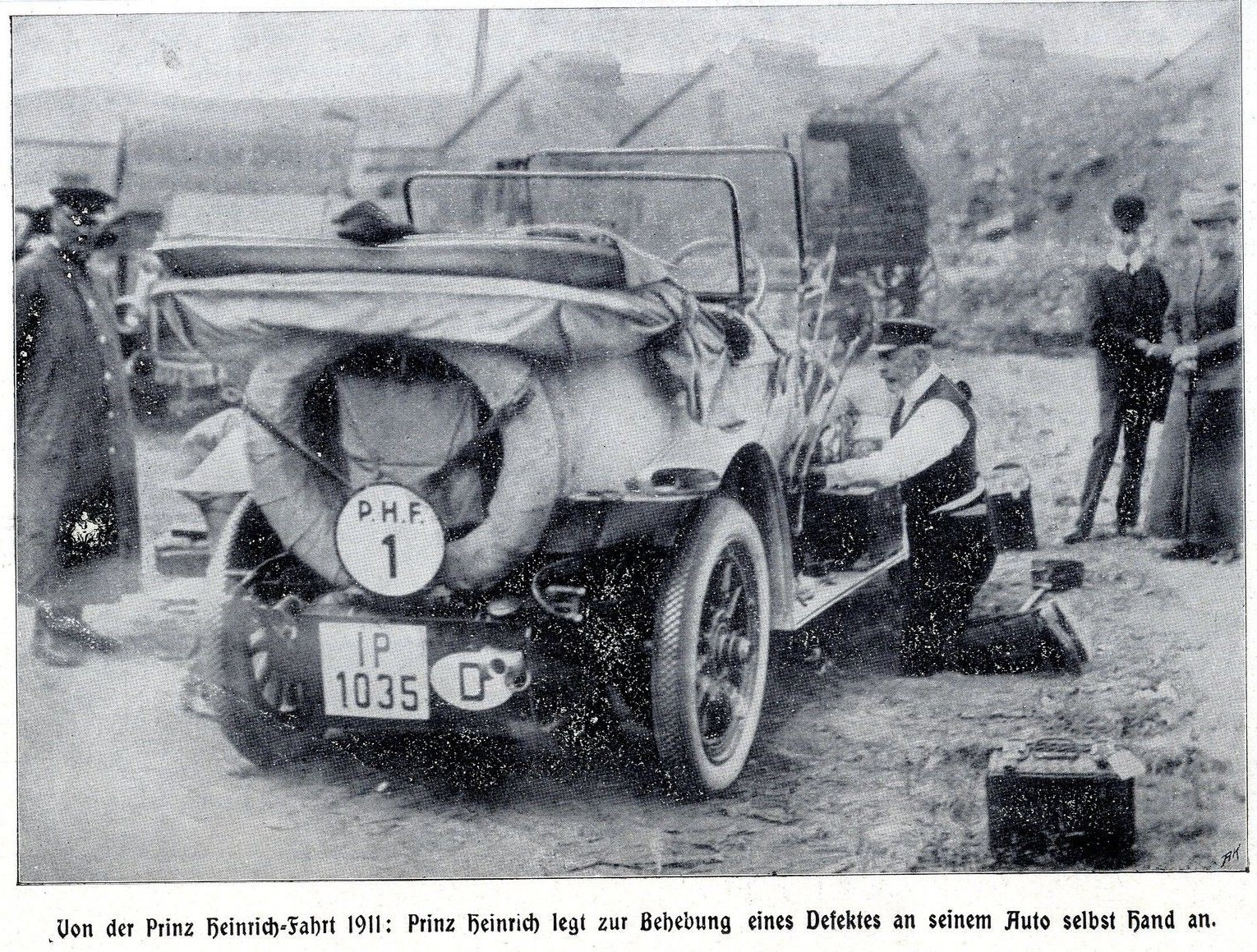
Prinz-Heinrich-Fahrt 1911: Prince Henry of Prussia fixing his car

The Prinz-Heinrich-Fahrt (Prince Heinrich Tour, also known as Prince Henry Tour), named after Prince Albert Wilhelm Heinrich of Prussia, was a multi day long distance motorcar contest held from 1908 to 1911. Due to being the premier motoring event of its time, it can be considered a precursor to the German Grand Prix, even though it was closer to modern day rallying. The brother of Emperor Wilhelm II, who had staged a Kaiserpreis for motorcars in 1907 (and for other sports also), was a motoring enthusiast and inventor.

Only production touring cars with four seats and three passengers were admitted, no specially made racing cars. The trophy for the winner was a model car made of 13.5 kg of silver.

Ferdinand Porsche himself won in 1910 with an Austro-Daimler.

The last event was in 1911, not as contest, but as a touristic event.

== See also ==
- Vauxhall Prince Henry, a production replica of a British car entered in the 1910 trial
