= Dürkopp Adler =

German motorcycle manufacturer (1860–1990)

- Industry: Manufacture of machinery for textile, apparel and leather production machinery industry and plant construction metal industry vehicle construction
- Founded: 1860
- Founder: Carl Baer, Heinrich Koch, Nikolaus Dürkopp
- Defunct: 1990
- Headquarters: Bielefeld, Germany
- Key people: Michael Kilian (CEO)
- Net income: €142 Mio
- Number of employees: 1321 (2015)
- Parent: ShangGong Group Co.
- Website: www.duerkopp-adler.com

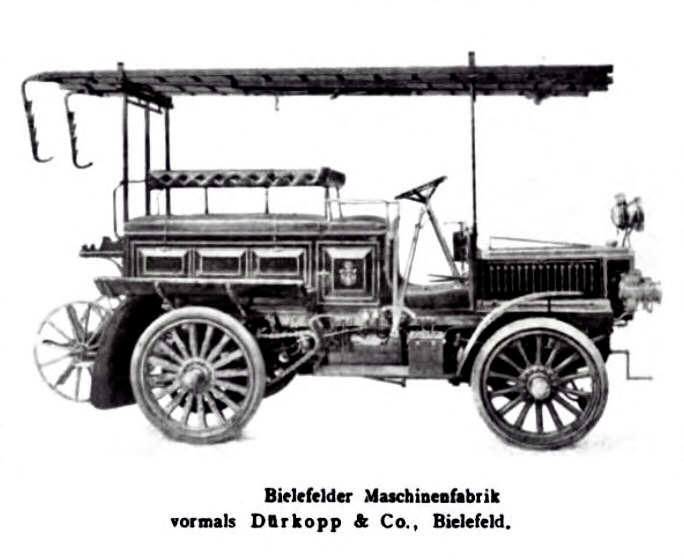
Bielefelder Maschinenfabrik AG, vormals Dürkopp & Co. fire ladder truck (1908)

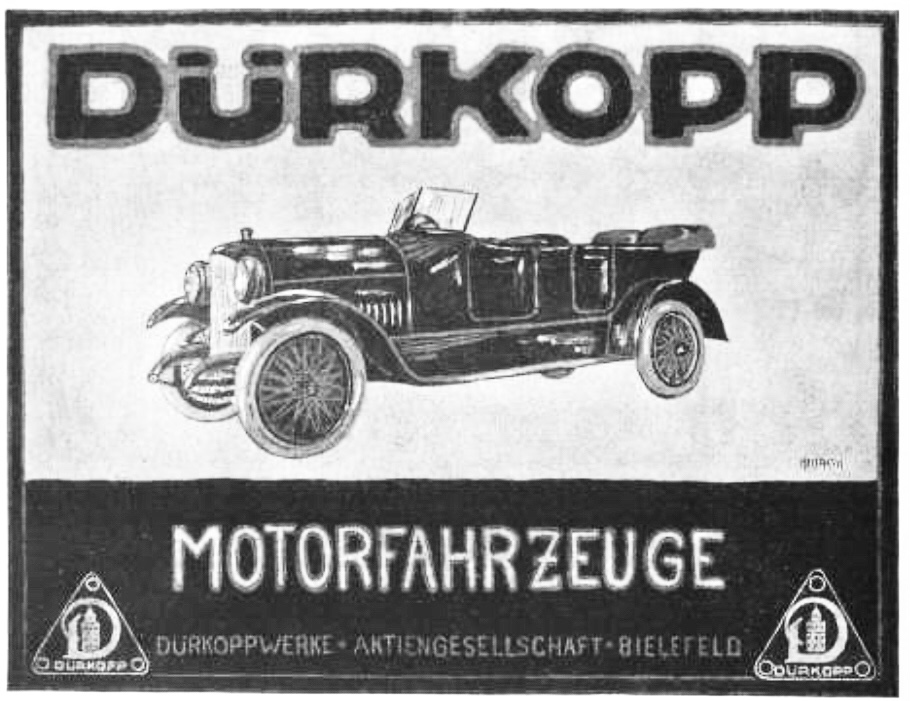
Dürkopp (1918)

Dürkopp Adler is a German manufacturer of material handling systems and industrial sewing machines that are used in the manufacture of garment and upholstery. It is headquartered in Bielefeld, Germany. The firm is a result of a merger in 1990 between Koch Adler Nahmaschinenwerke and Dürkoppwerke. It has operations in nearly 10 countries and has 11 subsidiaries.

The firm's equity is largely controlled by ShangGong Company of China.

== History ==
The firm has a history of automobile, ball bearings and motorcycle production but both Kochs Adler and Dürkopp's history began with sewing machines. Dürkoppwerke's history began in 1867 when Heinrich Dürkopp, who had earlier completed building a sewing machine on his own co-founded Dürkopp and Schmidt with a colleague, Carl Schmidt. The firm later dropped Schmidt from its name. Operating out of the backroom of a clock-maker's factory, the new firm made both household and industrial sewing machines. As the business profile became enhanced among local customers, the firm moved to a new building close to market street, Bielefeld in 1870. The company expanded sales to other regions in Germany and introduced specialized machines for shoe-making. In 1885, it began production of bicycles and ball bearings which were an early success. During its early period, Dürkopp experimented with many mechanical ideas and products, led by its founder, the firm began automobile production introducing a successful product, Knipperdolling to the market in 1906. The firm has produced three wheeled and two wheeled motorcycles. After World War I, the firm's debt profile grew and fell under the receivership of banks who went on to sell its automobile unit to Mercedes Benz. During the Second World War, the firm produced cylindrical bearings for tanks and weapons. Kochs Adler, which was majority-owned by the Oetker family, produced munitions and employed forced labor. Those products were jettisoned after the war and the firm went back to its core products, making sewing machines, conveyor belts, bicycles and motorcycles. By the year 1962, the firm concentrated on making sewing machines and conveyor belts for the garment industry. In 1990, it merged with Koch Adler, another Bielefeld based industrial sewing machine manufacturer that was founded in 1860.
