= Karl Fritsch =

Austrian botanist (1864–1934)

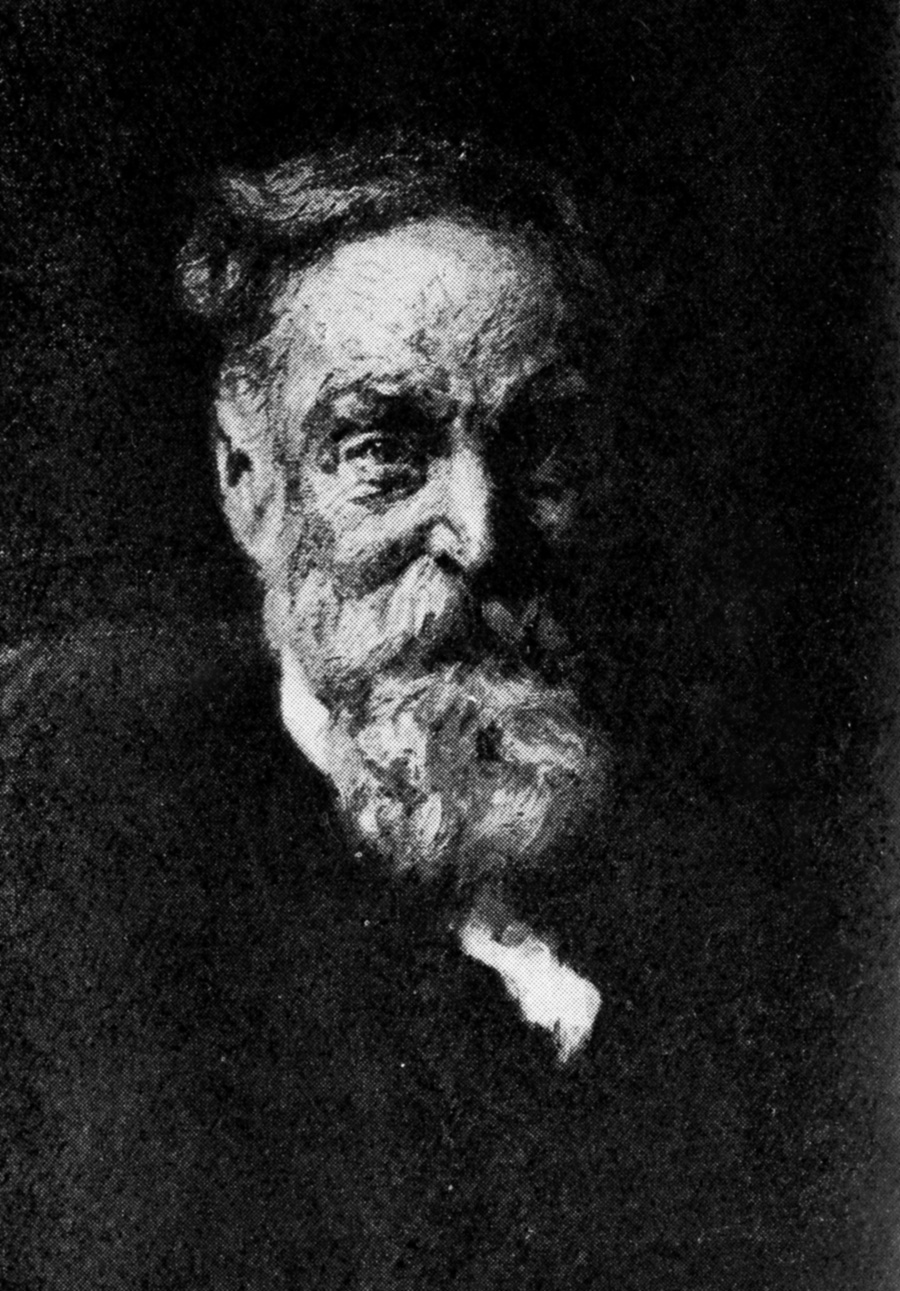
Karl Fritsch

Karl Fritsch (24 February 1864 – 17 January 1934) was an Austrian botanist. He was a specialist on the Gesneriaceae and the taxonomy of monocots.

== Biography ==
Fritsch was born in Vienna, the son of meteorologist Karl Fritsch, and educated mainly at the University of Vienna, obtaining his PhD degree in 1886 and his Habilitation in 1890. In 1900 he moved to the University of Graz as professor of Systematic Botany, where he built up the botanical institute. In 1910 he was appointed as director of the university's botanical garden, and in 1916 the new institute acquired its own building. He continued at Graz for the rest of his career, and died there.

Fritsch's extensive research focussed especially on the flora of Austria. He had a particular interest in the family Gesneriaceae and in the taxonomy of the monocots.

Between 1898 and 1902 Fritsch edited and distributed several fascicles (specimens no. 2801-3600) of the famous exsiccata work Flora exsiccata Austro Hungarica, a museo botanico universitatis vindobonensis edita which was started by Anton Kerner von Marilaun in 1881.
