= Sun (automobile) =

Defunct American motor vehicle manufacturer

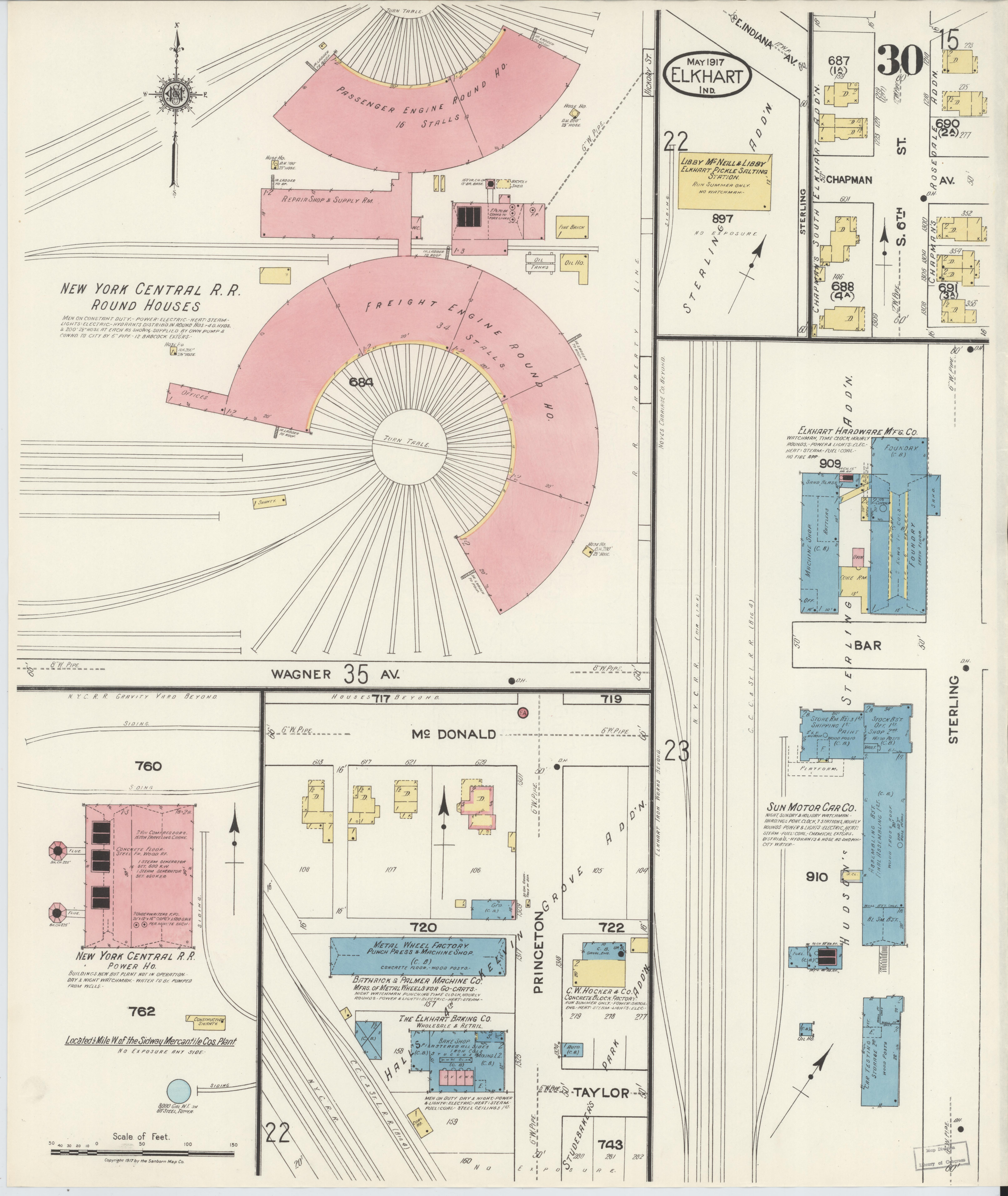
Sun Motor Car Company plant (1917)

The Sun automobile was made in Elkhart, Indiana from 1916 to 1917, and in Toledo, Ohio from 1921 to 1922.

The Sun Motor Car Company was originally created in Buffalo, New York, but moved to Elkhart before production began. Their slogan was "The Sun Outshines Them All". Roscoe C. Hoffman designed a lightweight six-cylinder car, manufactured from 1916 to 1917. There were four body styles offered on the 116-inch (2946 mm) wheelbase: sedan, roadster, 5 person touring and 7 person touring. It made 23 horsepower though the company dubiously claimed 50. The car had shaft drive and a three-speed sliding gear transmission, and was priced in the $1000 range. Sun Motor Cars ordered 3,500 engines under contract from the Beaver Manufacturing Company of Milwaukee, Wisconsin, but since a little over 1,100 cars were made in the two years, the company was in receivership by September 1917. The company's assets were purchased by the Automotive Corporation of Toledo, Ohio.

The Sun automobile of Toledo was a small two-seat roadster, with power coming from a 12 hp (9 kW) four-cylinder engine, produced in 1921 and 1922 only. It featured a 91-inch (2311 mm) wheelbase, disc wheels, and a claimed 50 miles per US gallon (4.7 L/100 km; 60 mpg_{‑imp}) and 50 mph (80 km/h).

The Automotive Corporation had built tractors in Toledo since shortly before the end of World War I. After taking over Sun Motor Car Company, Automotive Corporation provided parts and service to Sun owners, as well as gained useful experience in automobile manufacturing. Their new car of 1921 shared nothing with the old Sun except the logo. Even the slogan was new: "America's Greatest Little Car". Not only were the engines smaller, so was the wheelbase and price-- $375 in 1921 and $475 in 1922. A new lineup with bigger engines, longer wheelbases, and higher prices were announced but never produced for 1923.

== Sources ==
Kimes, Beverly Rae, Standard Catalog of American Cars 1805–1942, Krause Publications, 1996, ISBN 0-87341-428-4
