= Rebour =

The Rebour was a French automobile manufactured by Puteaux from 1905 until 1908. The Puteaux company built "luxury touring cars" and cabs; its model range consisted of 10/12 hp, 18/22 hp, 20/25 hp, and 40/50 hp cars. Each was powered by a pair-cast four-cylinder engine.

The Rebour was sold as the "Catalonia S.E.A.T." (Sociedad Española de Automóviles y Transportes, not to be confused with SEAT) in Spain.
