= Karl Fritsch (meteorologist) =

Austrian scientist, meteorologist and biologist (1812–1879)

Karl Fritsch (16 August 1812 – 26 December 1879) was an Austrian lawyer, meteorologist and naturalist. He also had an interest in insects, particularly the hymenoptera. He took a special interest in seasonal phenomena and is considered as a founder of phenology studies in Austria. He was a funder of the Austrian Society for Meteorology in 1865.

== Biography ==
Fritsch was born in Prague to Peter and Johanna née Pilz. He became interested in natural history and particularly meteorology after visiting the Prague Observatory as a boy. After school he studied philosophy and law (1833–1836) and during his internship he met Karl Kreisl at the Prague Observatory who supported him. When the Central Institute for Meteorological and Earth Magnetism was established in Vienna in 1851, Fritsch joined as an adjunct. He later became the deputy directory and worked there until his retirement in 1872. He then moved to live in Salzburg where he took charge of the meteorological observatory. In addition to meteorology, he was interested in insects, particularly the bees and he took a special interest in their seasonal activities. He established a network of observers who provided him data on the first appearance of bees in spring, the flowering of plants, as well as other seasonal phenomena. He presented the work on the long term studies on periodical phenomena in animals and plants at the London Statistical Congress of July 1860. He has been considered as a founder of phenological studies in Austria.

Fritsch married Caroline Berka in 1843 and after her death in 1862 he married Anna Steinwender in 1863. From his second marriage he had a son, the botanist Karl Fritsch (1864–1934).
