= Vincenzo Lancia =

Italian racing driver and engineer (1881–1937)

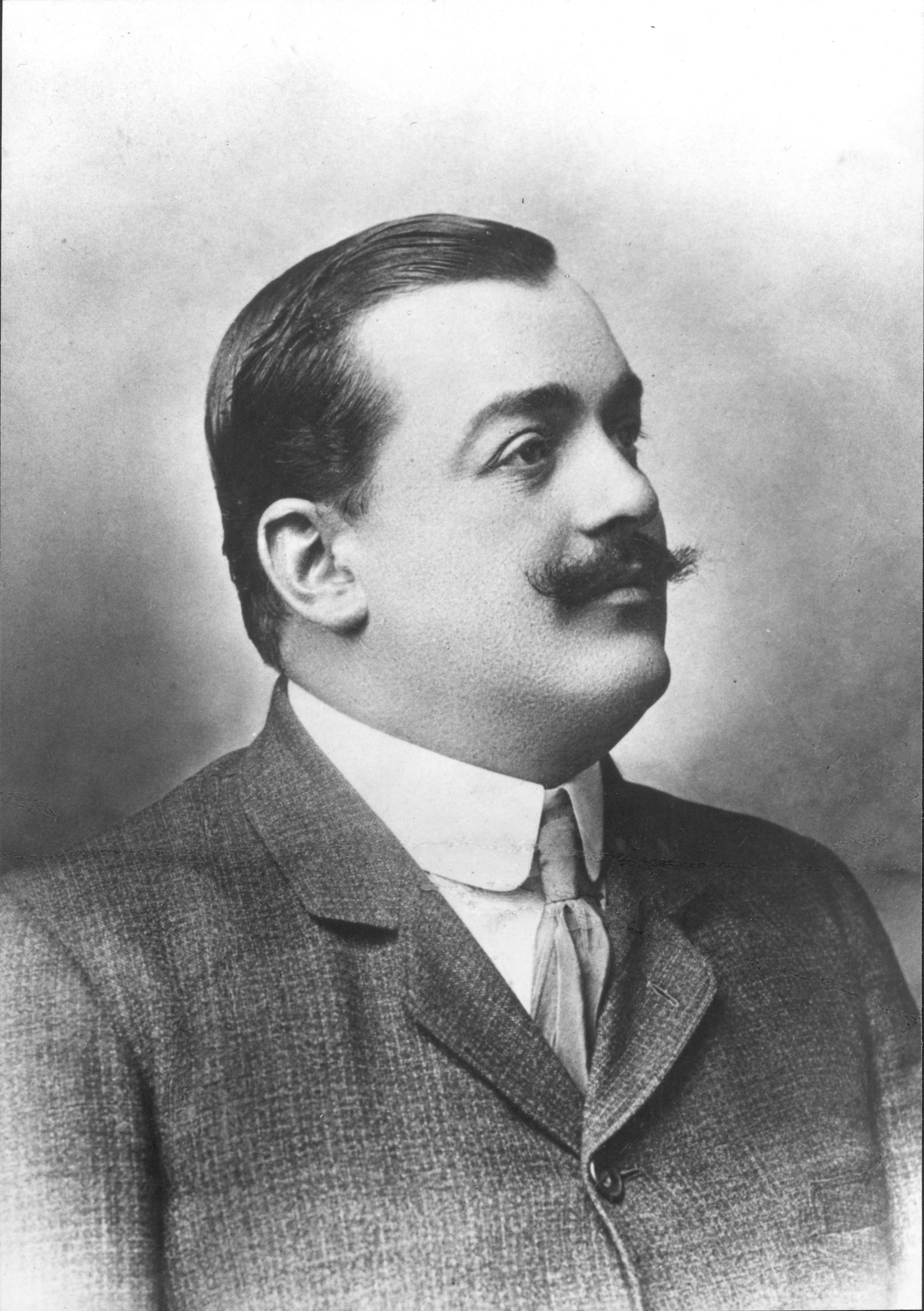
- Vincenzo Lancia
- Born: Vincenzo Lancia; 24 August 1881; Fobello, Piedmont, Kingdom of Italy
- Died: 15 February 1937 (aged 55); Turin, Piedmont, Kingdom of Italy
- Occupations: Racing driver, engineer and founder of Lancia
- Spouse: Adele Miglietti
- Children: 3, including Gianni

Vincenzo Lancia (24 August 1881 – 15 February 1937) was an Italian racing driver, engineer and founder of Lancia.

Vincenzo Lancia was born in the small village of Fobello on 24 August 1881, close to Turin; his family tree starts in Fabello around 1550. He was the youngest of four children (one sister and two brothers), his father being a soup canner who made his money in Argentina before returning to Turin to start his business. From an early age, Vincenzo showed a gift with numbers, and it was intended for him to become a bookkeeper, but developed an interest in machinery and engineering, and was fascinated with the new motor car.

He eventually became an apprentice with Giovanni Battista Ceirano, a bicycle importer in Turin, and he was listed as their bookkeeper in the company's brochure of 1898. He was also developing his skills in engineering, design and construction, and developed patience, perseverance and determination. Soon he could tackle most problems single-handedly.

In February 1899, Lancia was sent to help Count Carlo Biscaretti di Ruffia with his Benz. The two men quickly became friends. Biscaretti di Ruffia was to become important in Lancia's later career and was credited with the design of the now familiar Lancia logo (1911).

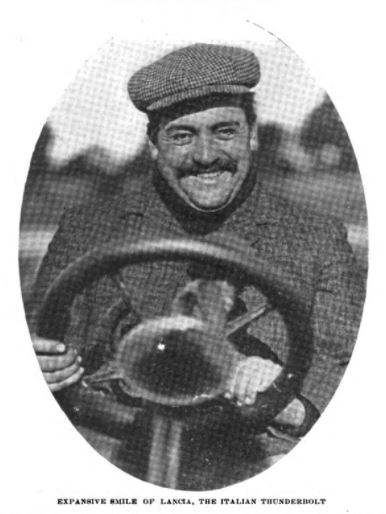
Vincenzo Lancia pictured in 1905 edition of Automobile Topics

By 1900, however, Lancia was chief inspector at Fiat, and also a test driver, although only 19. His driving impressed the Fiat bosses, and he was invited to drive their cars in races. His first success was in 1900, in Fiat's second race. Lancia led the first lap of first French Grand Prix at Le Mans with a time of 53 minutes 42 seconds. He was an exceptionally fast driver, often the fastest of all, but often suffered a mechanical failure. In 1906, Vincenzo Lancia won the Gold Cup in Milan driving the Fiat 28-40 HP.

His first car was built in 1907 - the 12 hp Alfa, which included much of the technology now taken for granted, and he produced groundbreaking models such as the Lambda and the Aprilia. In 1930 with Giovanni "Pinin" Battista Farina he co-funded the newly established Carrozzeria Pinin Farina the car design firm and coachbuilder, with headquarters in Cambiano, Turin, Italy.

He died from a heart attack on 15 February 1937, just before the Aprilia was put into full production. He was 55 years old. He lies buried at Fobello.

His wife Adele Miglietti and their son Gianni Lancia continued with the management of the car manufacturer until its sale to Carlo Pesenti of Italcementi in 1955.
