= Scintilla AG =

Swiss power tool manufacturer

Scintilla
- Company type: Joint-stock company
- Industry: Electrical equipment
- Founded: 1917 in Solothurn, Switzerland
- Headquarters: Solothurn, Switzerland
- Products: Magnetos, small electric motors, household appliances, power tools
- Number of employees: ~1,100 (2010)
- Parent: Robert Bosch GmbH (from 1954)

Scintilla is a Swiss company based in Solothurn for the development, manufacture, and distribution of power tools. Founded in 1917 as a subsidiary of Brown, Boveri & Cie to make magnetos for combustion engines, it has been part of Bosch since the mid-20th century.

== History ==
Scintilla was founded in 1917 as a subsidiary of Brown, Boveri & Cie to manufacture magnetos for combustion engines. It expanded rapidly through orders to equip the aircraft industry in the United States. Foreign subsidiaries were set up between 1925 and 1927 but were dissolved or sold during the economic crisis of the 1930s. In 1943 the company was placed on the Allied blacklist; the ban on imports and exports, which lasted until mid-1946, led it to switch production to small electric motors, household appliances, and power tools.

In 1947 the company opened a branch factory in St. Niklaus and brought the world's first electric jigsaw to market. In 1954 Robert Bosch GmbH of Stuttgart acquired the majority of its shares, subsequently integrating Scintilla step by step as a subsidiary of its own company, and has held 100% of the shares since 2005. The company had about 1,100 employees in 2010.

== Bibliography ==
- 50 Jahre Scintilla AG, Solothurn, 1917–1967, n.d.
- A. Grichting, Scintilla AG und Gemeinde St. Niklaus, 2005
