= 1914 French Grand Prix =

Race details
- Date: 4 July 1914
- Official name: Grand Prix de l'Automobile Club de France
- Location: Lyon, France
- Course: Public roads
- Course length: 37.629 km (23.380 miles)
- Distance: 20 laps, 752.58 km (467.600 miles)

Fastest lap
Driver	(Germany) Max Sailer	Mercedes GP
- Time: 20:06.0

Podium
First	(Germany) Christian Lautenschlager	Mercedes GP
Second	(France) Louis Wagner	Mercedes GP
Third	(Germany) Otto Salzer	Mercedes GP

The 1914 French Grand Prix was a Grand Prix motor race held at Lyon on 4 July 1914. Hailed as one of the greatest races of the twentieth century, it was a contest between the French Peugeots and the German Mercedes. For the first time, the Grand Prix was run to an engine limitation – of 4.5L maximum capacity. It was won by the Mercedes of Christian Lautenschlager who won at an average speed of 105.7 km/h (65.7 mph) after a tense seven-hour contest with the Peugeot of Georges Boillot.

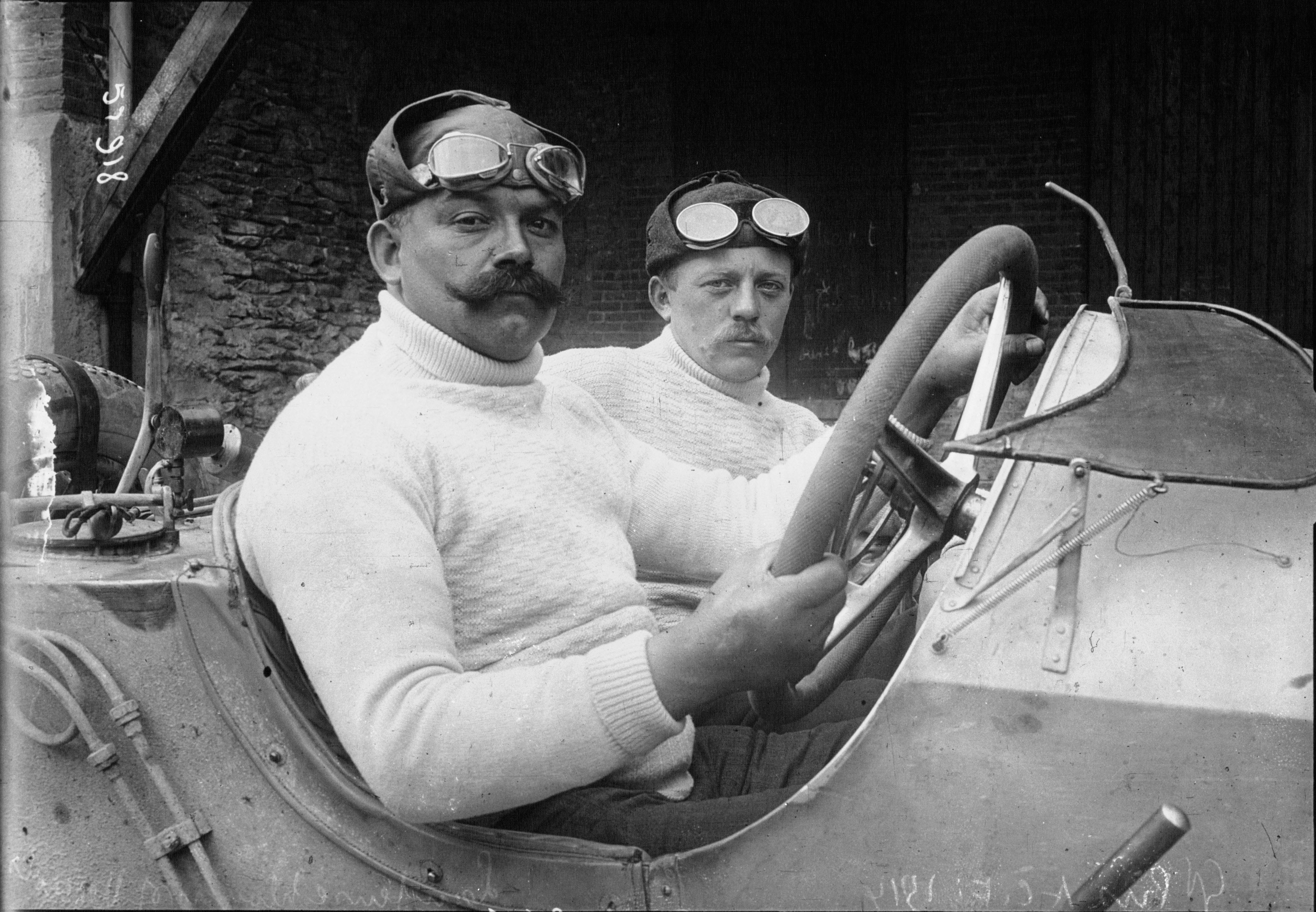
Christian Lautenschlager with his riding mechanic Hans Rieger No. 28 Mercedes

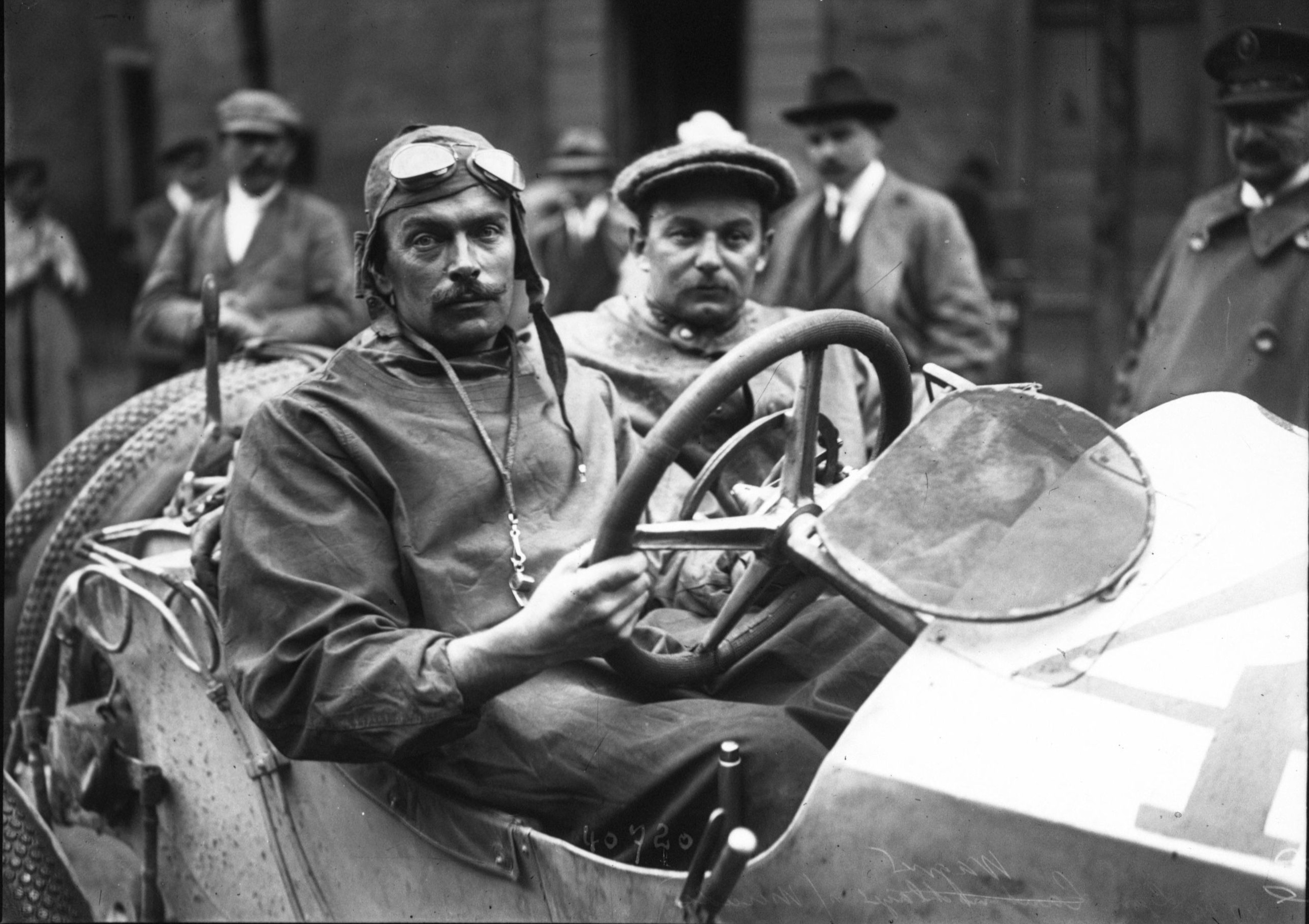
Louis Wagner in his No. 40 Mercedes

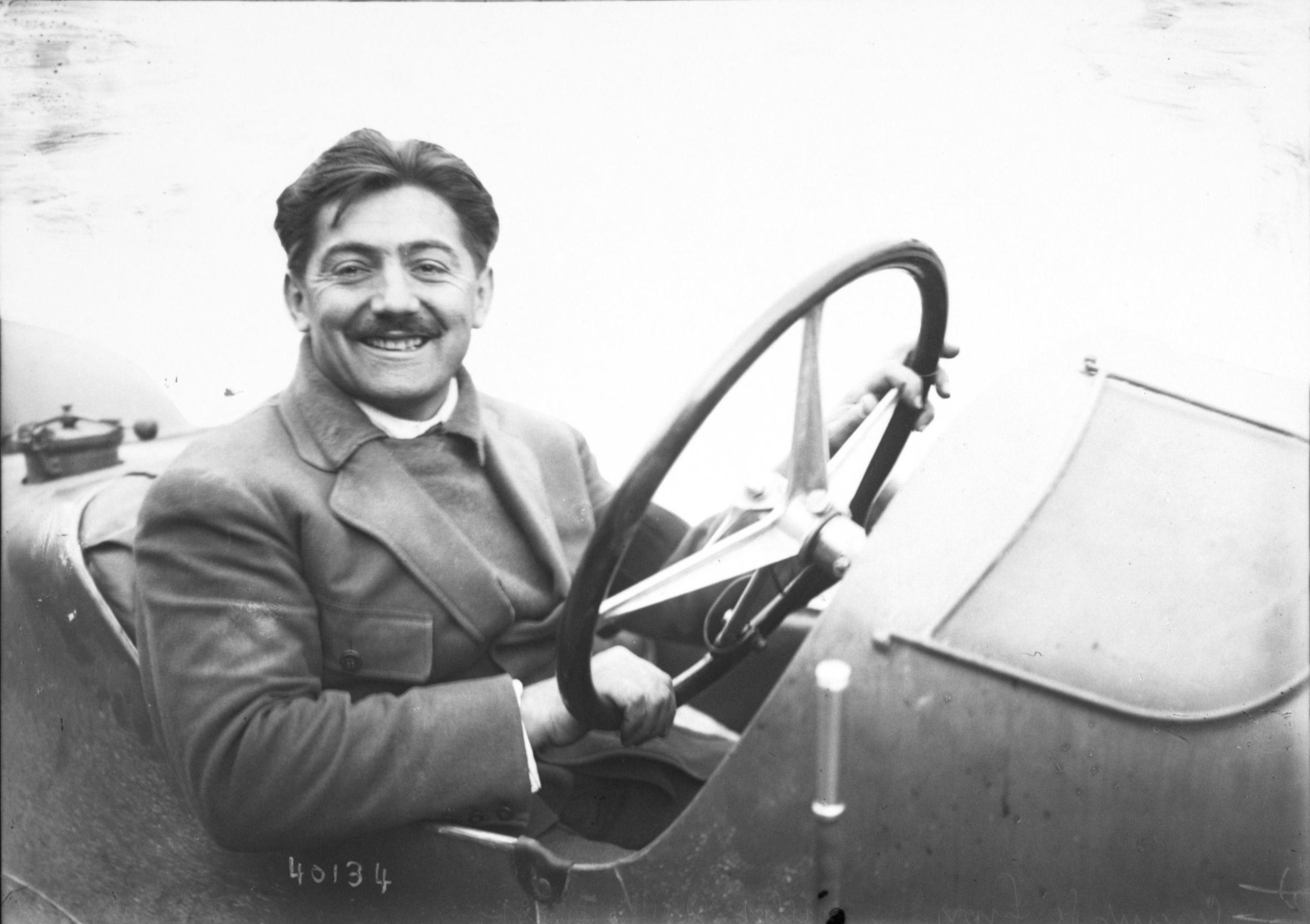
Georges Boillot No.5 Peugeot

== Regulations and Circuit ==
For several years, the Automobile Club de France (ACF) had been trying to reduce engine sizes in racing which it saw as increasingly dangerous with their higher speeds. In earlier French GP, the cylinder bore was limited. This year, for the first time, it mandated a maximum engine size of 4.5-litres along with an allowable weight range of 800–1,100 kg (1,764–2,425 lb) (excluding fluids and tools). This obviously benefited the leading French racing manufacturers of Peugeot and Delage, that had dominated the recent years of nimble voiturette racing along with Sunbeam, at the expense of the big-engined cars of Italy and Germany. There was also an entry limit of five cars per manufacturer, and no privateer entries were permitted.

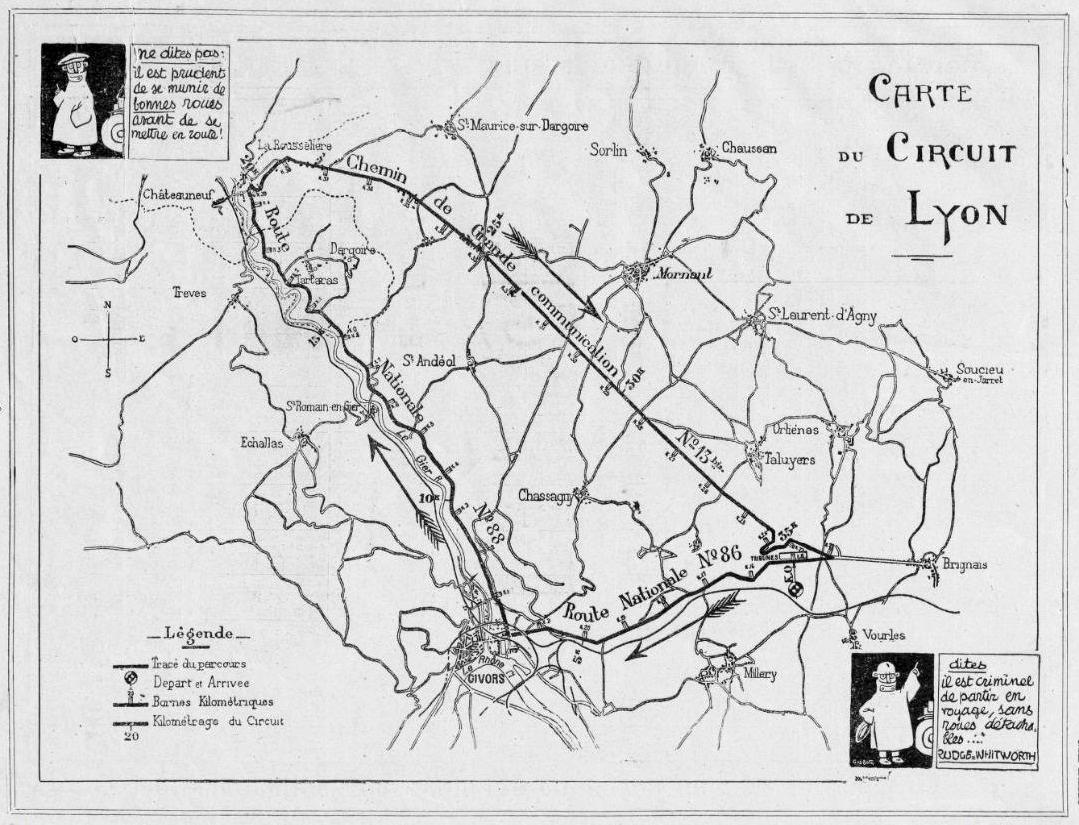
The 1914 Lyon circuit (north is to the right)

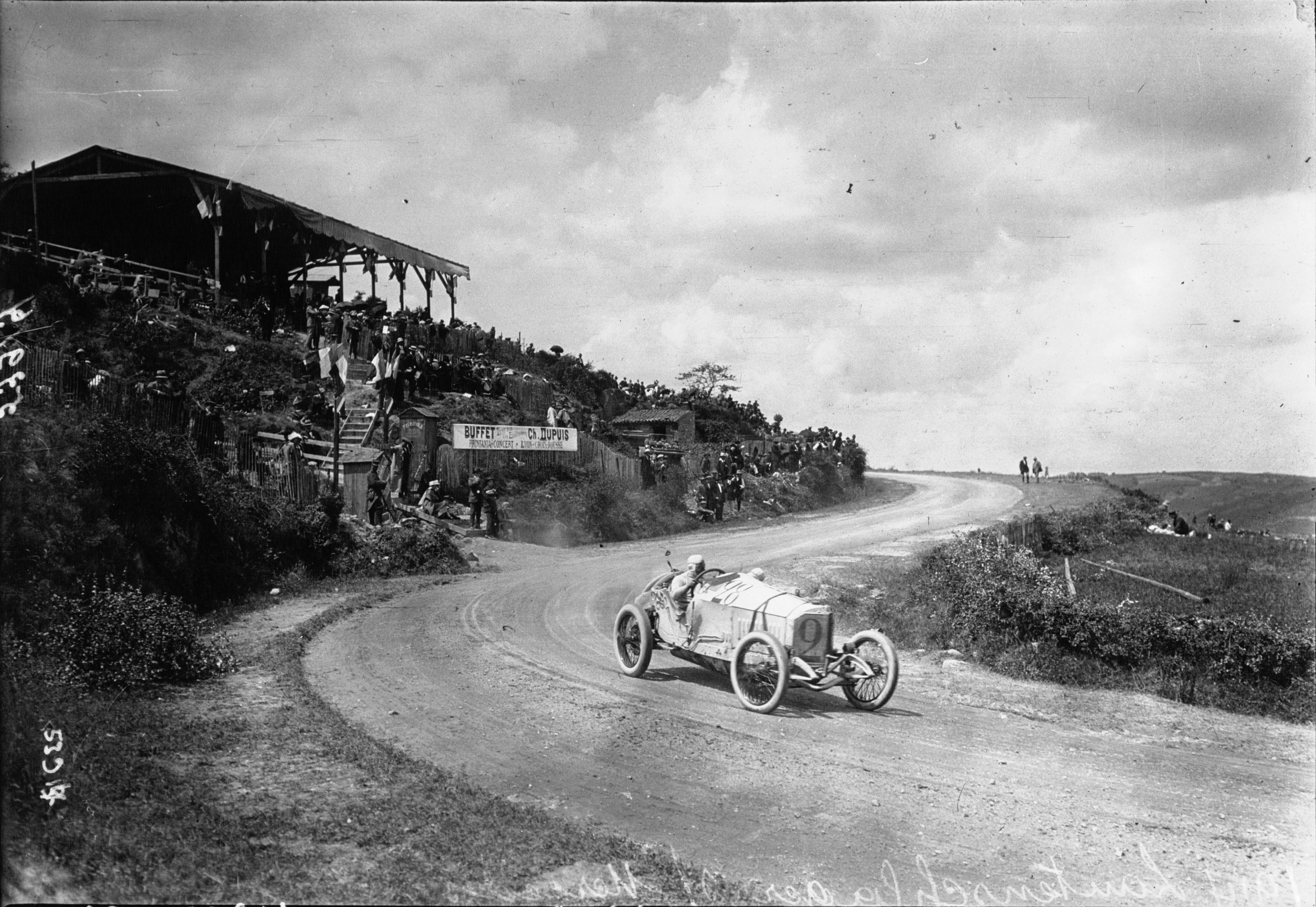
Lautenschlager descending le piege de la mort switchback

The city of Lyon promised large subsidies to host and the race was held on a 37.6 km clockwise road circuit to the south of the city. The northernmost point, the Les Sept Chemins hairpin, is located to the south of Brignais-Les Ronzières, in the commune of Vourles. Start and Finish was some 800m to the south of the hairpin at the Route nationale 86 (today Route Départementale 386) leading to the town of Givors. Between the Givors railway stations, it turned south west and took the Route nationale 88 (today Route Départementale 488) Route de Rive-de-Gier winding along beside the Gier (a tributary of the Rhône) to Châteauneuf. There, the circuit turned north east again. Racers returned on a 12 km (7.5 mi) long Chemin de Grande Communication (today Route Départementale 342) straight before coming to a steep downhill right-left switchback (nicknamed le piege de la mort – the Death trap- at 45°38′30.1″N 4°44′55.6″E). A sharp right hand turn at the hairpin Les Sept Chemins completed the lap. At the end of June the two hairpin turns were concreted and the course was re-laid with granite chips to prevent its break-up and coated with calcium chloride to reduce the dust raised. The Grand Prix was to be twenty laps of the circuit, totalling 752.6 km.

== Entries ==
On 28 June, the Archduke Franz Ferdinand, heir to the Austro-Hungarian empire was assassinated in Sarajevo. A week later, the French Grand Prix was held under an increasingly tense political situation across Europe.

The race attracted one of the highest-quality fields hitherto assembled, of 37 starters from 13 manufacturers and 6 countries. Peugeot were the strong favourites to repeat their victories in 1912 and 1913. They arrived with the new EX-5 (or ‘L-45’, after its engine size) for team drivers Georges Boillot, Jules Goux and Victor Rigal. The 4.5-litre four-cylinder engine had a twin-overhead cam (DOHC) and generated 112 bhp. Now fitted with four-wheel brakes it also sported a streamlined extended tail. Boillot had tested it at Brooklands and found it lifted the top speed by 8%. The tail also accommodated two spare tyres.

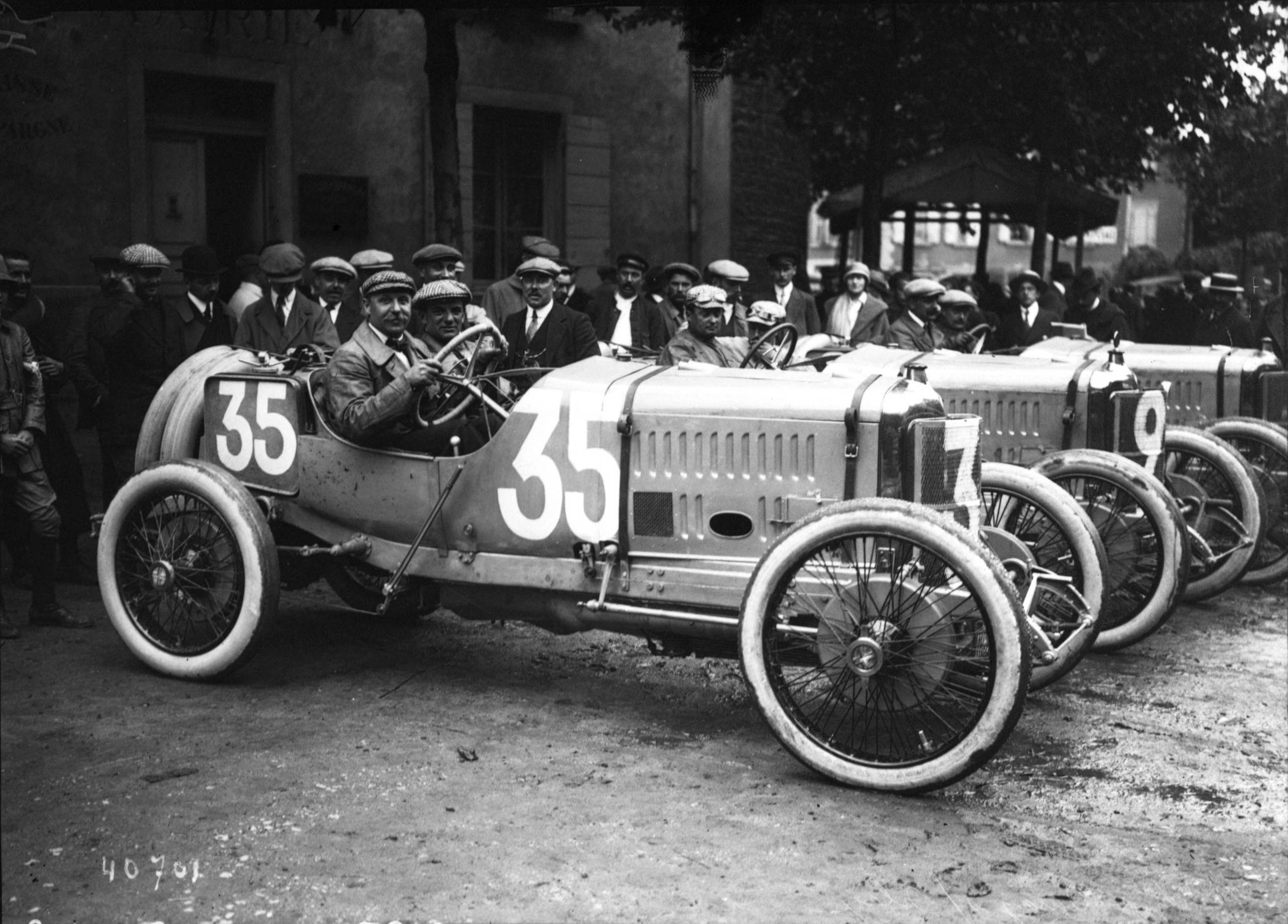
Arthur Duray and the Delage team

Louis Delâge bought the new 5-speed Type S for Albert Guyot, Arthur Duray and Paul Bablot. Like the Peugeots and FIATs, it was sporting four-wheel brakes. New French company Alva convinced Ferenc Szisz, winner of the inaugural Grand Prix in 1906, out of retirement to lead their team.

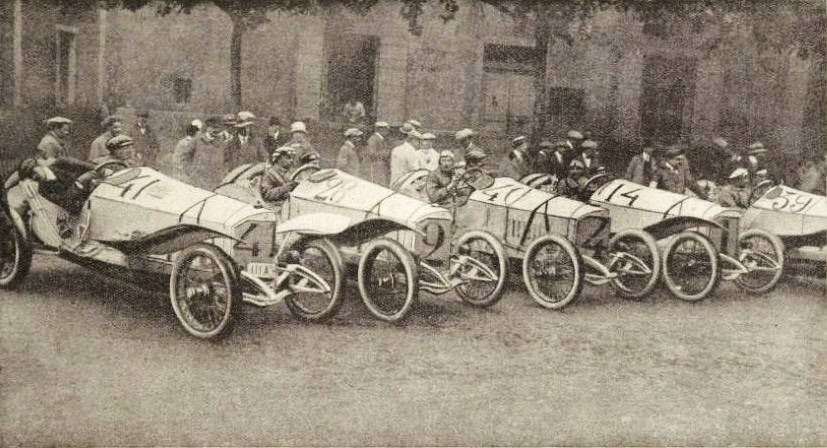
The 5-strong Mercedes team

The most serious opposition to the French teams would come from Mercedes, returning to the Grand Prix for the first time since winning in 1908 with much bigger engines, well over 10 liter. Under the 4.5-litre capacity limit, higher revs were needed to get power, as superchargers were nearly a decade away. The company had not yet made a racing engine that revved over 1500rpm, so Paul Daimler engaged the aero-engine division to assist with engine development. The new unit had innovative single-cast cylinders with four valves each and a single overhead camshaft (SOHC), giving 106 bhp at 3100rpm. Gone was the chain-drive, instead a lighter live rear-axle was used. However, they did persist with rear brakes only. Five of the six 18/100 cars built were entered, with a strong team of drivers led by Christian Lautenschlager, victor in 1908. Alongside him were Otto Salzer, young future Mercedes director Max Sailer, French veteran Louis Wagner and Belgian Mercedes-agent Théodore Pilette.

The new Opel was a development of the 4.0-litre 1913 model, retaining its single-overhead camshaft, with four valves per cylinder and a live rear axle like the Mercedes. They were the lightest cars in the field, well over 100 kg lighter than most others. Regular works driver Carl Jörns led a team of three cars.

From Italy came FIAT (including veteran Alessandro Cagno), Felice Nazzaro's own team Automobili Nazzaro, and a single entry from Aquila Italiana. Great Britain was represented by Sunbeam (Resta, Lee Guinness and Chassagne) and Vauxhall who included American Ralph DePalma in their squad.

Manufacturer/Type	Engine size	Car Number	Driver
(France) Alda	4.4L S4	1	(Hungary) Ferenc Szisz
(France) Alda	4.4L S4	15	(Italy) Pietro Bordino
(France) Alda	4.4L S4	29	(France) Maurice Tabuteau
(Germany) Opel	4.44L S4	2	(Germany) Carl Jörns
(Germany) Opel	4.44L S4	16	(Germany) Emile Erndtmann
(Germany) Opel	4.44L S4	30	(Germany) Franz Breckheimer
(Belgium) Nagant	4.44L S4	3	(France) Leon Elskamp
(Belgium) Nagant	4.44L S4	17	(France) Dragutin Esser
(United Kingdom) Vauxhall	4.49L S4	4	(United Kingdom) John Hancock
(United Kingdom) Vauxhall	4.49L S4	18	(United States) Ralph DePalma
(United Kingdom) Vauxhall	4.49L S4	31	(United Kingdom) William Watson
(France) Peugeot EX-5	4.49L S4	5	(France) Georges Boillot
(France) Peugeot EX-5	4.49L S4	19	(France) Jules Goux
(France) Peugeot EX-5	4.49L S4	32	(France) Victor Rigal
(France) Th. Schneider	4.44L S4	6	(France) René Champoiseau
(France) Th. Schneider	4.44L S4	20	(France) Fernand Gabriel
(France) Th. Schneider	4.44L S4	33	(France) . Juvanon
(Italy) Caesar Scacchi		7	(Did not arrive)
(Italy) Caesar Scacchi		21	(Did not arrive)
(Italy) Automobili Nazzaro	4.44L S4	8	(Italy) Felice Nazzaro
(Italy) Automobili Nazzaro	4.44L S4	22	(France) Jean Porporato
(Italy) Automobili Nazzaro	4.44L S4	34	(Italy) . De Moraes ("Cenesio")
(France) Delage Type S	4.44L S4	9	(France) Paul Bablot
(France) Delage Type S	4.44L S4	23	(France) Albert Guyot
(France) Delage Type S	4.44L S4	35	(Belgium) Arthur Duray
(United Kingdom) Sunbeam GP	4.44L S4	10	(France) Jean Chassagne
(United Kingdom) Sunbeam GP	4.44L S4	24	(United Kingdom) Dario Resta
(United Kingdom) Sunbeam GP	4.44L S4	36	(United Kingdom) Kenelm Lee Guinness
(Switzerland) Pic-Pic	4.43L S4	11	(France) Paul Tournier
(Switzerland) Pic-Pic	4.43L S4	25	(United Kingdom) Thomas Clarke
(Italy) Aquila Italiana	4.49L S4	12	(Italy) Eugenio Beria d'Argentine (Did not arrive)
(Italy) Aquila Italiana	4.49L S4	26	(Italy) Bartolomeo Costantini
(Italy) Aquila Italiana	4.49L S4	37	(Did not arrive)
(Italy) FIAT S57/14B	4.49L S4	13	(Italy) Alessandro Cagno
(Italy) FIAT S57/14B	4.49L S4	27	(Italy) Antonio Fagnano
(Italy) FIAT S57/14B	4.49L S4	38	(United Kingdom) John Scales
(Germany) Mercedes 18/100 GP	4.48L S4	14	(Germany) Max Sailer
(Germany) Mercedes 18/100 GP	4.48L S4	28	(Germany) Christian Lautenschlager
(Germany) Mercedes 18/100 GP	4.48L S4	39	(Germany) Otto Salzer
(Germany) Mercedes 18/100 GP	4.48L S4	40	(France) Louis Wagner
(Germany) Mercedes 18/100 GP	4.48L S4	41	(Belgium) Théodore Pilette

== Practice ==
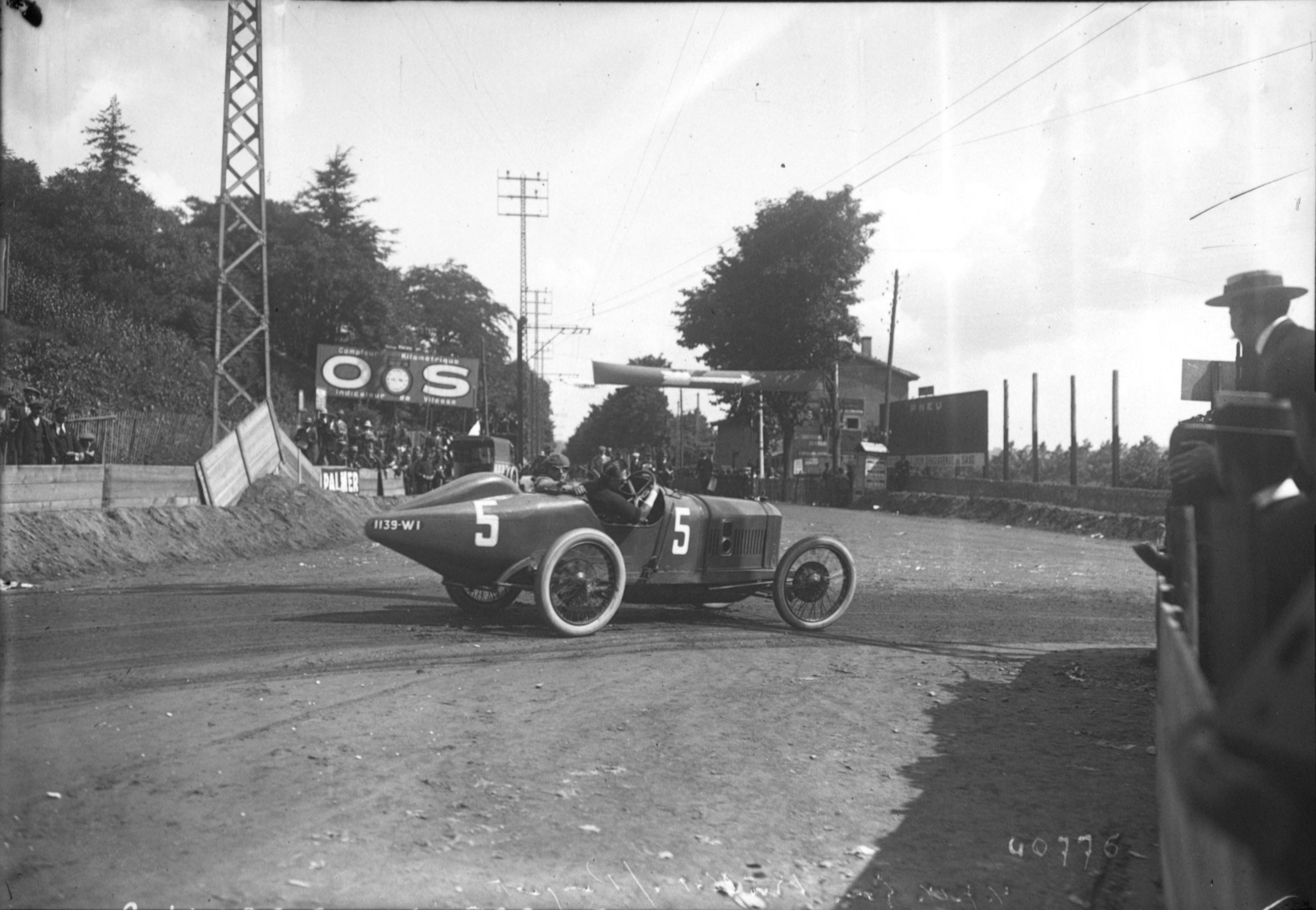
Boillot's No. 5 Peugeot at the hairpin Les Sept Chemins – note the streamlined tail housing two spare tyres

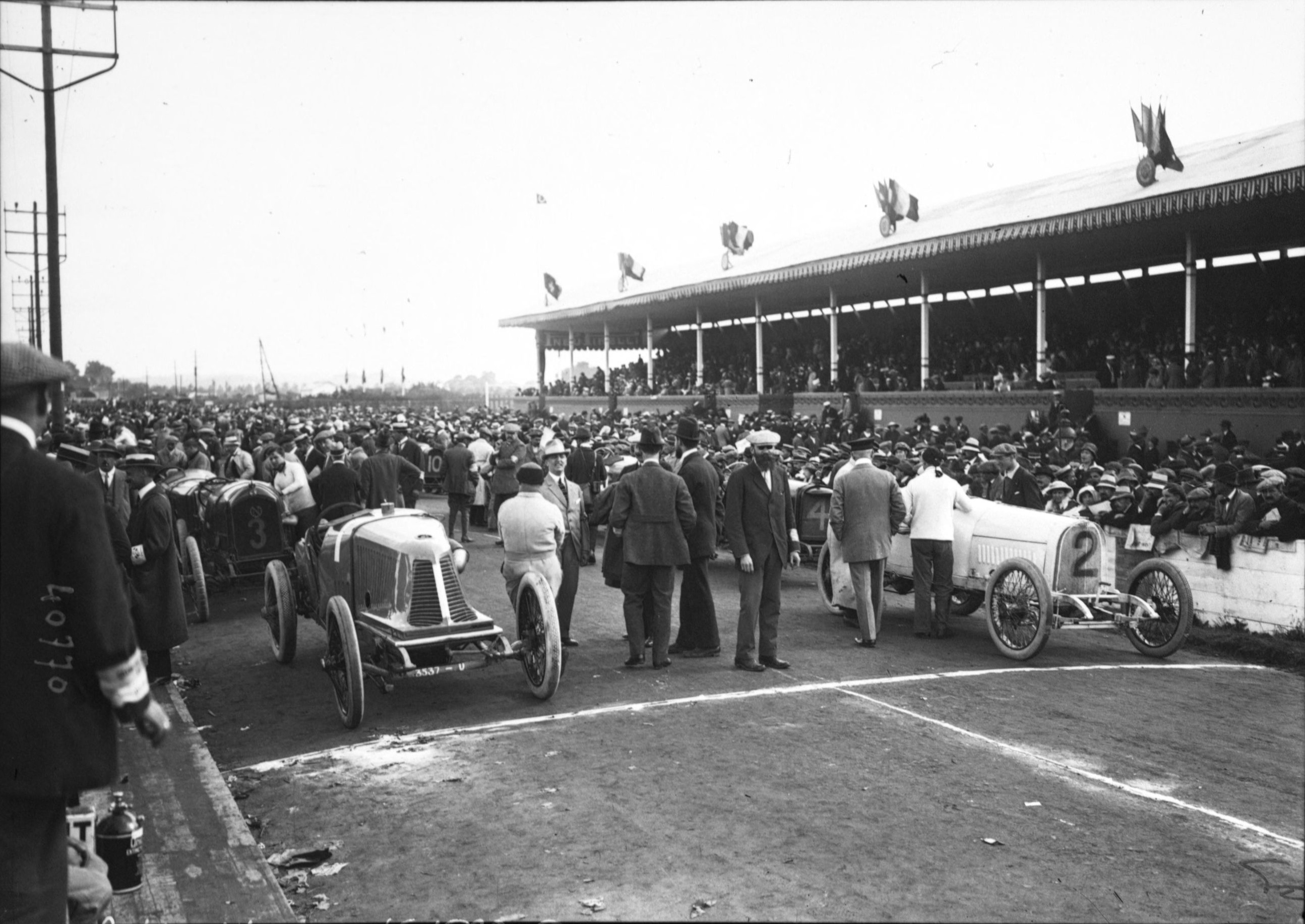
Grid before the start

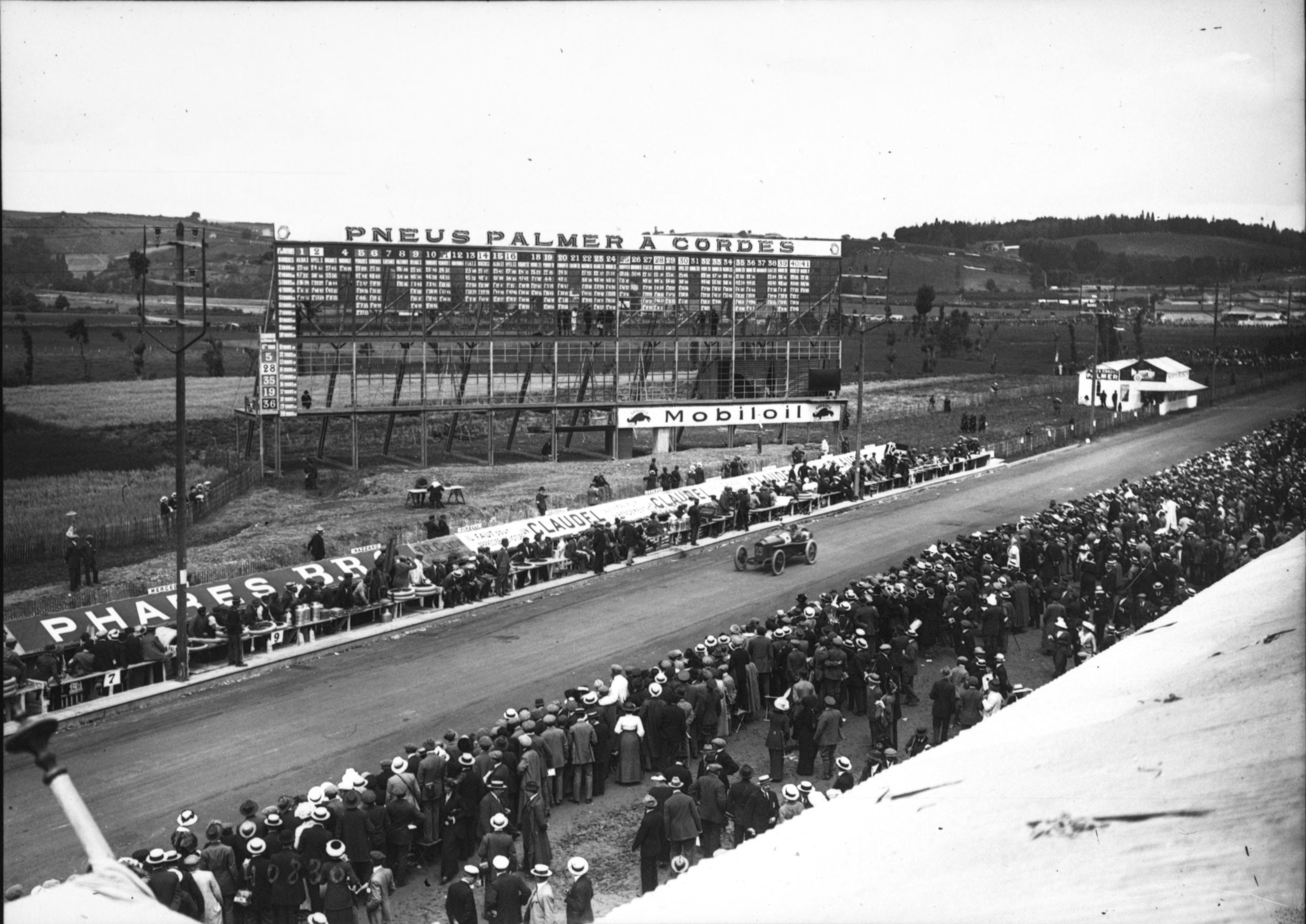
Goux's Peugeot coming past the start/finish line to start his 7th lap

Mercedes knew that meticulous preparation would be needed if they were to beat the French cars. In January, the company had sent its team to France to reconnoitre the track to calculate gearing ratios. Two cars were ready in April for testing where two changes were noted. The extended tail was cut off to save weight and, from the long straights and winding corners, the engineers recommended changing to a five-speed gearbox. However, there was no time to arrange the latter.

The ACF organised a practice period on the new circuit three weeks before the event. However, because they were public roads all that could be arranged were a couple of 90-minute pre-dawn sessions, which left most teams disgruntled. The Vauxhall cars were not even ready by then.

The Peugeot team was confident that their 4-wheel brakes would allow better cornering, but the circuit had only two sharp and slow corners. On the other hand, large parts were fast sections or flat out straights were the higher top-end speed from the Peugeot's DOHC engine and streamlined rear-end would be decisive. In contrast, the Mercedes’ lower centre-of-gravity would provide better road-holding to give it an edge over the French cars. They were also running on more durable Continental tyres while the French cars were on Dunlops. Thus, the Mercedes team calculated they would only need to make a single tyre-stop for each car during the race.

During practice though the Peugeot drivers found their cars handled badly, with the poor weight distribution having the spare tyres stowed in the extended streamline tail. The only disruption for Mercedes was when Pilette missed a gear-change and over-revved his engine badly.

== The Race ==
Race-day was hot and fine, and about 300,000 spectators lined the roads. So many were coming out on the trains from the city that many missed the 8am start. For the first time, cars were flagged off in pairs at 30-second intervals, in numerical order. First away were Szisz and Jörns, but Boillot was the first to arrive back at the finish-line. However, Sailer was ahead on elapsed-time with an 18-second lead and from the beginning he forced the pace, drawing Boillot into a speed-contest. Jörns had to stop on the first lap for radiator repairs, dropping his Opel out of the reckoning.

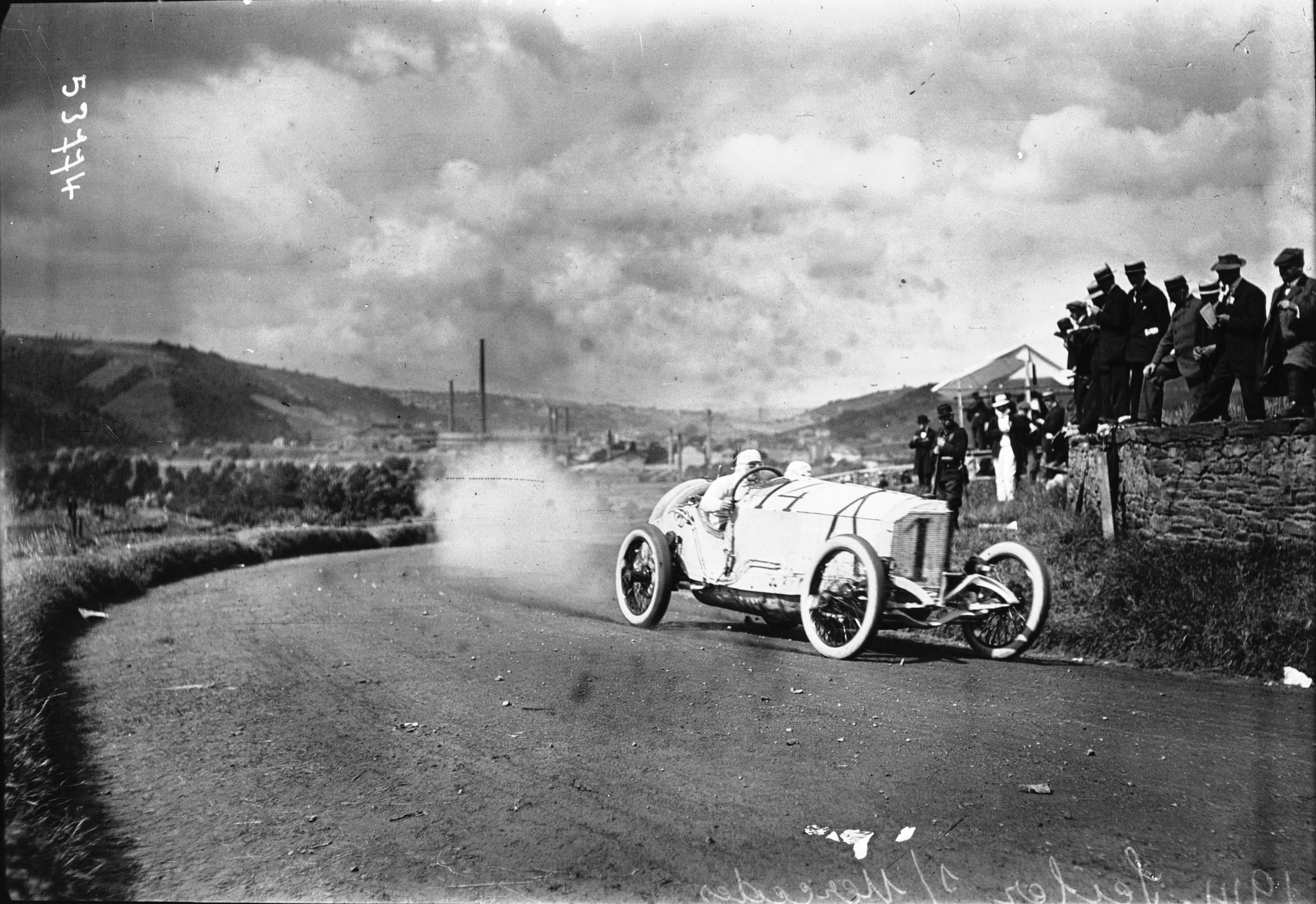
Max Sailer setting the pace in his Mercedes at the Grand Prix

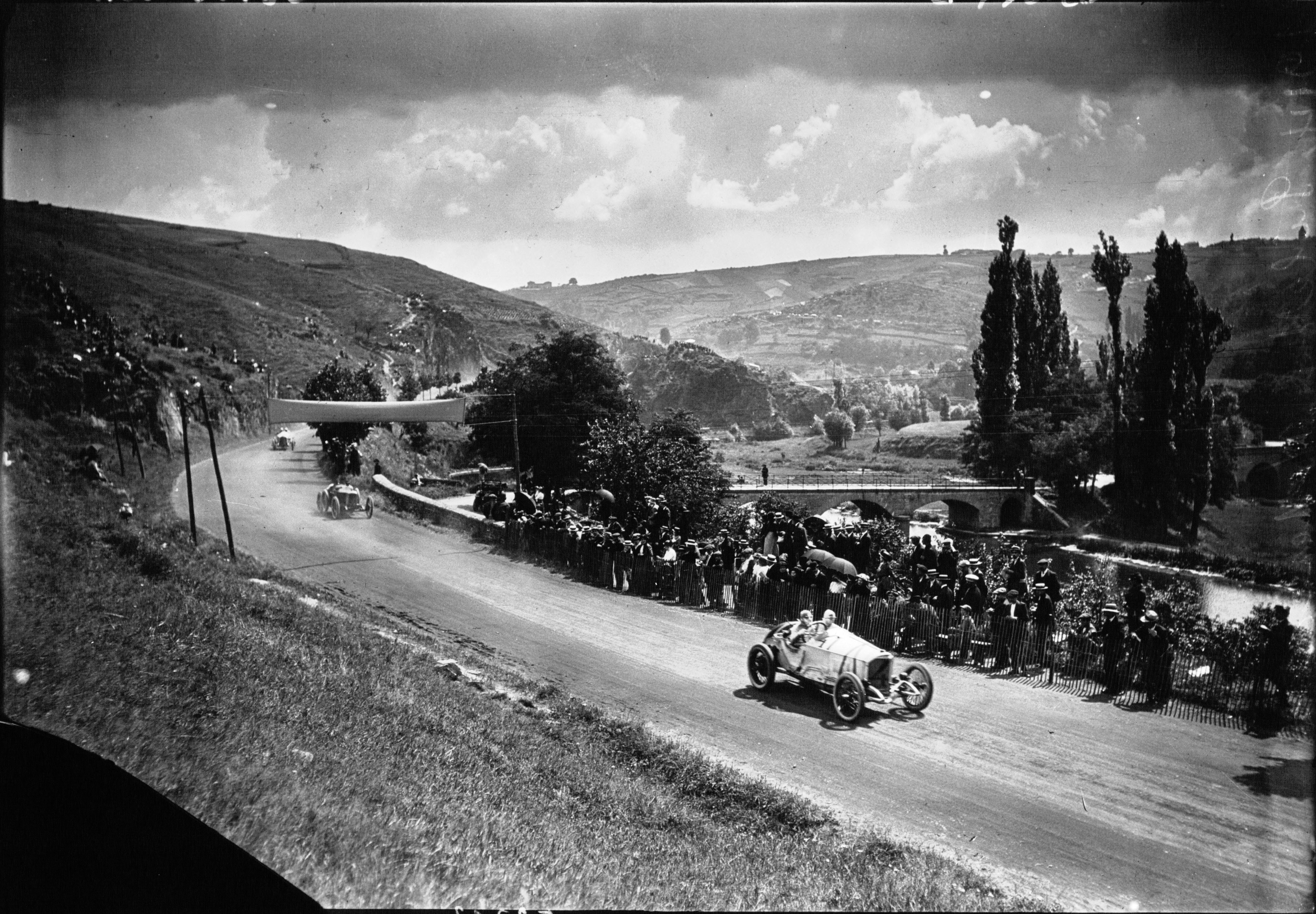
Pilette's Mercedes ahead of a Nazzaro on the winding road by the River Gier

When Boillot had to pit unexpectedly after an hour, on the third lap, it allowed Sailer to take the lead on the road. Pilette's Mercedes retired at the same time, the gearbox damage in practice proving terminal. Sailer pressed on setting the fastest lap of the race on lap four and extending his lead over Boillot to almost three minutes. Whether it was racing inexperience, or internal rivalry with team-leader Lautenschlager to prove a point, Sailer had pushed his car too hard and stopped with a broken conrod along the Gier River on the sixth lap. (Sailer and no one else at Mercedes had said there was a deliberate plan to use a “hare” to break the Peugeots.)

After seven laps Boillot had the lead over Lautenschlager, while Goux had just overtaken Duray's Delage to move into third. On the tenth lap at the halfway point, Wagner, Salzer, and Resta's Sunbeam, had also overtaken the Delage. Boillot led by a minute and the German team started coming in for their scheduled stops. Lautenschlager was running out of brakes and his stop became a bit of a shambles as the normally well-drilled Mercedes team cost him 2–3 minutes in the pits. But the Peugeot Dunlops were wearing far quicker – Boillot had to make six pitstops for tyre changes to the single ones for the Mercedes cars.

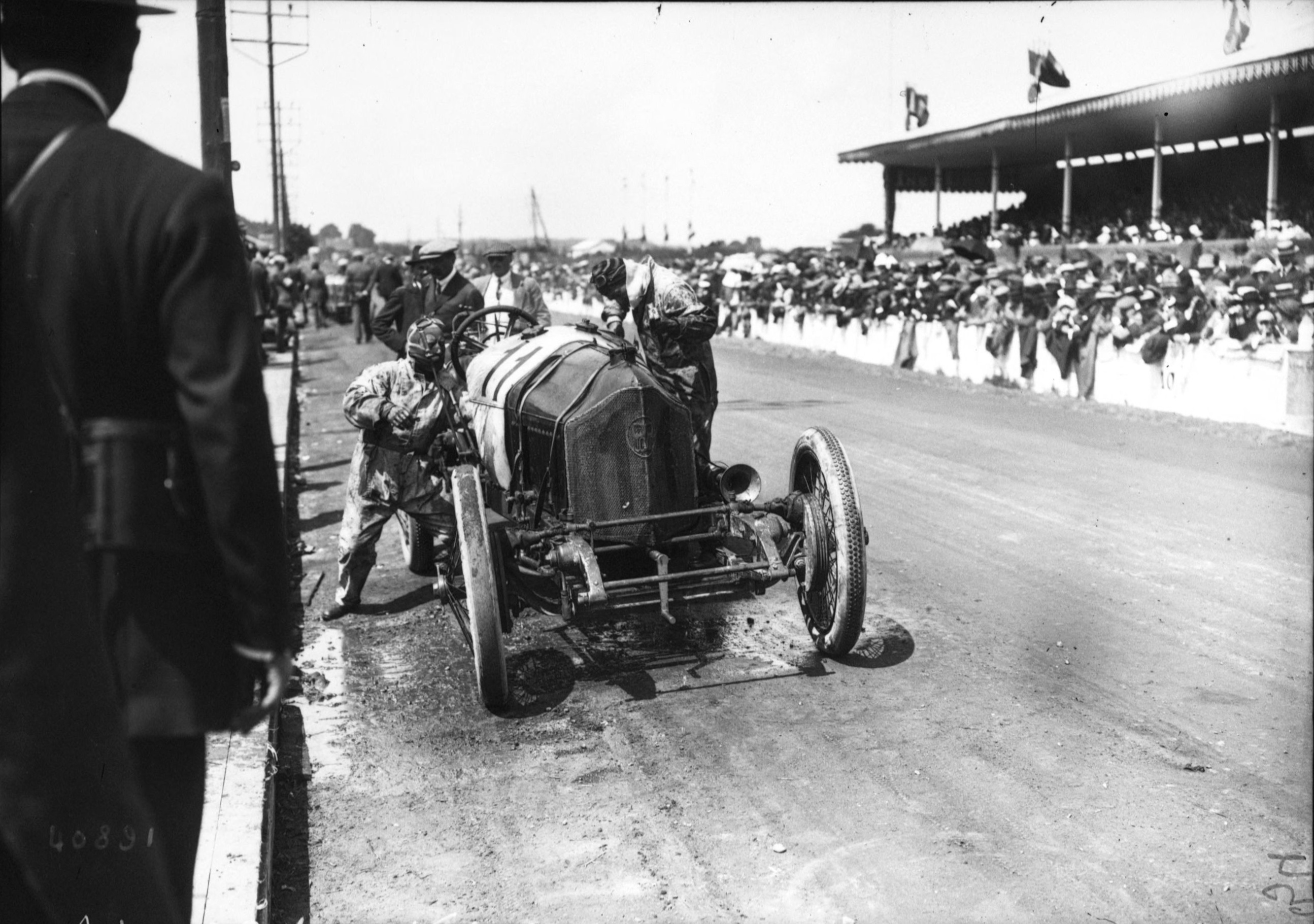
Refuelling Tournier's Pic-Pic

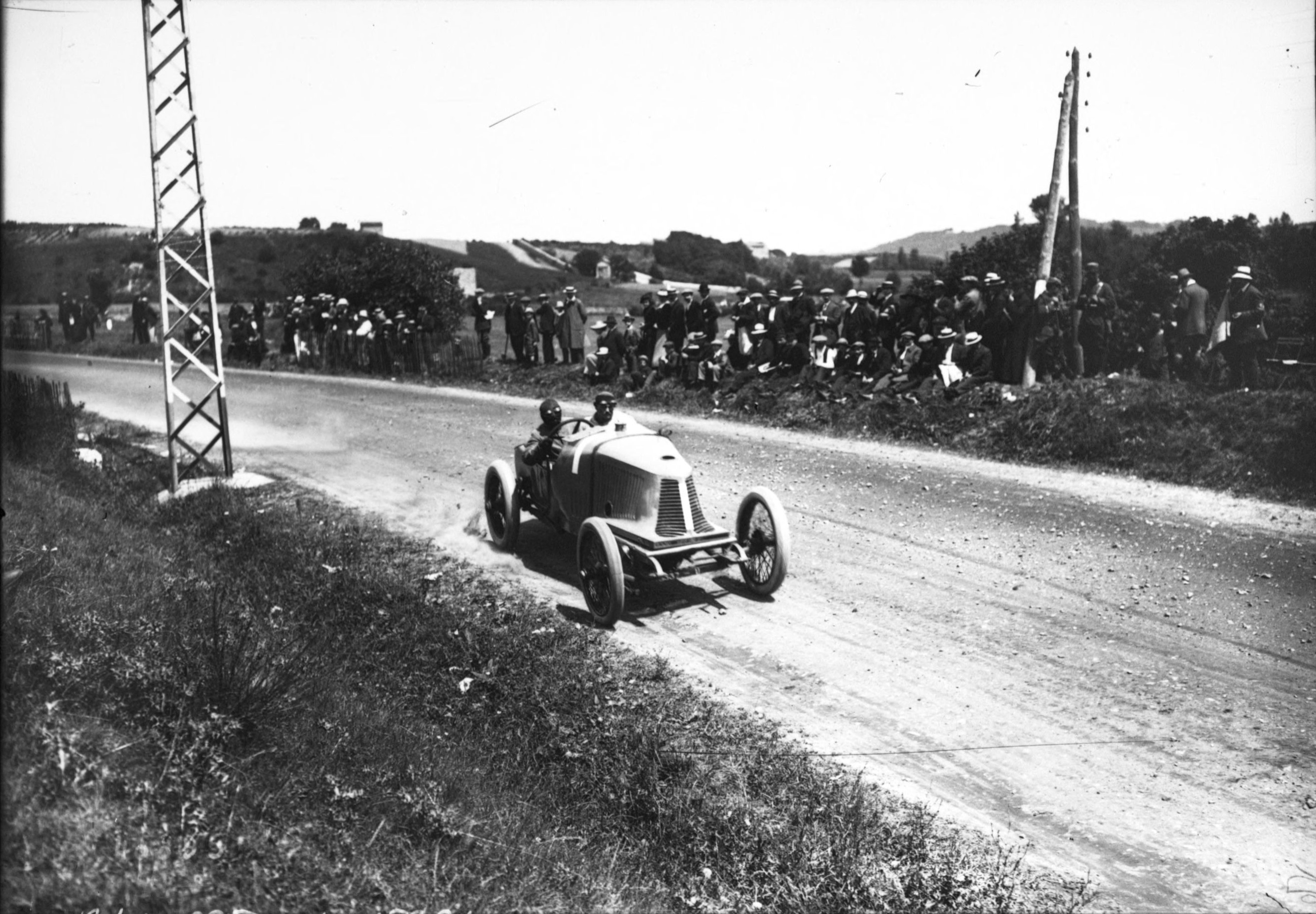
1906 Grand Prix winner Ferenc Szisz in an Alda

But despite that, Boillot's skill and all-or-nothing driving kept him with a 2-3 minute lead. By the 11th lap with the pitstops done, Wagner had passed Goux and Lautenschlager to move into second. Then a dangerous accident happened. Szisz had pulled over on the roadside to change a wheel, when he was struck by Breckheimer's Opel when it was obscured by the dust. His arm broken, it fell to his less injured mechanic to slowly get the car back to the pits where Szisz could get attention.

The Peugeots’ stops lost their advantage and the Mercedes’ pursuit was relentless. Although Wagner had to pit on lap 15 to replace tyres, Salzer overtook Goux to move up to fourth. When Boillot then had to pit for tyres on the 17th lap Lautenschlager reduced the lead from 2 minutes to just 14 seconds. He overtook the Peugeot as they approached Givors. Boillot's car had been thrashed to its limits and was now falling apart, down to three cylinders. By the end of the 18th lap he was 30 seconds behind. Boillot kept pushing regardless but on the last lap his engine finally expired when he over-revved it on the climb out of the Gier valley. Boillot was distraught, hunched over the steering wheel weeping at his failure.

So after seven hours of racing, Mercedes took a crushing 1-2-3 victory with Lautenschlager repeating his 1908 win ahead of Wagner and Salzer. The French crowd was silent, with Goux's fourth place nearly ten minutes back ahead of Resta's Sunbeam being scant consolation.

== Post-race ==
Within a month of the race Europe had descended into World War I war and European racing ceased for four years. With his 25000 franc prizemoney, Lautenschlager retired from racing and was able to build himself a house. Georges Boillot was initially the personal driver for Marshal Joffre, but then transferred to the French Air Force (Armée de l'Air) as a fighter pilot. He was shot down over Verdun in April 1916 in a dogfight and died in the wreckage.

Fagnano had throttled back on his FIAT and finished 11th and last, well over an hour after the winner. It was postulated that, as the sole finisher for FIAT, it had been a prudent move by the team. This was in light of the fact that the scrutineers had found the total engine cylinder-volume was over the 4500cc limit. This would disqualify the team but FIAT's strong support of the race in the past allowed them to race.

After being driven back to celebrations in Berlin, one of the Mercedes (probably Lautenschlager's) was sent on display at the dealership in London, and also two of the Opels. War broke out just afterward, and it was commandeered and turned over to Rolls-Royce where it was carefully pulled apart. The SOHC valve train of the successful GP engine ended up in the Rolls-Royce Eagle aero engine design and in Bristol fighter planes.

American driver Ralph DePalma bought one of the Mercedes GP cars after the race and took it to Tcitizens The USA to win the 1915 Indy 500. Believed to be Wagner's No. 40, there is still considerable conjecture and confusion as to which Mercedes chassis ended up in London and the USA. Carl Fisher, on the Indianapolis 500 organising committee, purchased two of the Peugeot EX-5s. When they landed in the United States he handed them over to the Premier Motor Corporation for three replicas to be made. In the 1915 Indianapolis 500, DePalma drove the Mercedes to beat Dario Resta, in a Peugeot EX-5, by three and a half minutes. With DePalma holding out, Resta got his revenge the year after, in the shortened 1916 Indianapolis 500. A Peugeot won again in the 1919 race.

== Classification ==
Pos	No	Driver	Car	Laps	Time/Retired
1	28	(Germany) Christian Lautenschlager	Mercedes 18/100 GP	20	7:08:18.4
2	40	(France) Louis Wagner	Mercedes 18/100 GP	20	7:09:54.2
3	39	(Germany) Otto Salzer	Mercedes 18/100 GP	20	7:13:15.8
4	19	(France) Jules Goux	Peugeot L45	20	7:17:47.2
5	24	(United Kingdom) Dario Resta	Sunbeam GP	20	7:28:17.4
6	17	(France) Dragutin Esser	Nagant	20	7:40.28.2
7	32	(France) Victor Rigal	Peugeot L45	20	7:44.28.2
8	35	(Belgium) Arthur Duray	Delage Type S	20	7:51.32.0
9	6	(France) René Champoiseau	Th. Schneider	20	8:06.51.6
10	2	(Germany) Carl Jörns	Opel	20	8:17.09.6
11	27	(Italy) Antonio Fagnano	FIAT S57/14B	20	8:26.11.2
DNF	5	(France) Georges Boillot	Peugeot L45	19	Engine
DNF	11	(France) Paul Tournier	Pic-Pic	18	Accident
DNF	22	(Italy) Jean Porporato	Nazzaro	18	Engine
DNF	3	(France) Leon Elskamp	Nagant	18	Clutch
DNF	23	(France) Albert Guyot	Delage Type S	18	Engine
DNF	9	(France) Paul Bablot	Delage Type S	16	Engine
DNF	16	(Germany) Emile Erndtmann	Opel	12	Transmission
DNF	30	(Germany) Franz Breckheimer	Opel	12	?
DNF	10	(France) Jean Chassagne	Sunbeam GP	12	Engine (conrod)
DNF	1	Ferenc Szisz	Alda	11	Driver injured
DNF	15	(Italy) Pietro Bordino	Alda	10	?
DNF	13	(Italy) Alessandro Cagno	FIAT S57/14B	10	Valve
DNF	36	(United Kingdom) Kenelm Lee Guinness	Sunbeam GP	9	Engine
DNF	25	(United Kingdom) Thomas Clarke	Pic-Pic	8	Wheel
DNF	33	(France) Henri Juvanon	Th. Schneider	8	Engine
DNF	34	(Italy) . De Moraes ("Cenesio")	Nazzaro	8	Engine
DNF	20	(France) Fernand Gabriel	Th. Schneider	8	Engine
DNF	18	(United States) Ralph DePalma	Vauxhall	7	Gearbox
DNF	29	(France) Maurice Tabuteau	Alda	7	Accident
DNF	38	(United Kingdom) John Scales	FIAT S57/14B	7	Engine (Valves)
DNF	14	(Germany) Max Sailer	Mercedes 18/100 GP	5	Engine
DNF	8	(Italy) Felice Nazzaro	Nazzaro	3	Engine
DNF	41	(Belgium) Théodore Pilette	Mercedes 18/100 GP	3	Drive (Propeller shaft)
DNF	31	(United Kingdom) William Watson	Vauxhall	2	Engine (Carburettor)
DNF	26	(Italy) Bartolomeo Costantini	Aquila Italiana	1	Engine
DNF	4	(United Kingdom) John Hancock	Vauxhall	1	Engine

Grand Prix Race
Previous race: None	1914 Grand Prix season Grandes Épreuves	Next race: None
Previous race: 1913 French Grand Prix	French Grand Prix	Next race: 1921 French Grand Prix
