= Louis Wagner (racing driver) =

French racing driver (1882–1960)

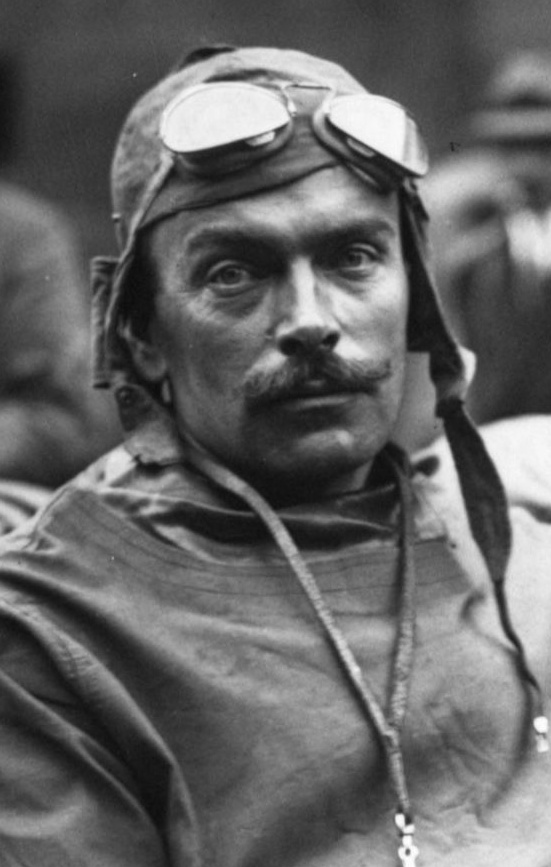
- Wagner in 1914
- Born: Louis Auguste Wagner; 5 February 1882 Le Pré-Saint-Gervais, Seine, France
- Died: 30 March 1960 (aged 78) Montlhéry, Seine-et-Oise, France

Championship titles
- Major victories Vanderbilt Cup (1906)

Champ Car career
- 2 races run over 2 years
- First race: 1911 American Grand Prize (Savannah)
- Last race: 1919 Indianapolis 500 (Indianapolis)
Wins	Podiums	Poles
0	0	0

24 Hours of Le Mans career
- Years: 1925–1926
- Teams: Ariès, Peugeot
- Best finish: 6th (1925)
- Class wins: 0

Louis Auguste Wagner (5 February 1882 – 13 March 1960) was a French racing driver who, racing for various domestic and foreign brands, won the 1908 American Grand Prize and the inaugural 1926 British Grand Prix. He was runner-up in the German Mercedes team that scored a 1-2-3 victory at the July 1914 French Grand Prix just before the War broke out. Wagner was also a pioneer aviator.

== Early life ==
Wagner was born in Le Pré-Saint-Gervais, located in what is now the Seine-Saint-Denis department.

== Motor racing ==
Wagner began racing cars while in his teens and claimed victory in 1903 driving a Darracq in a voiturette class race at the Circuit des Ardennes at Bastogne, Belgium. Wagner was one of the drivers for the Darracq team in the 1904 Gordon Bennett Cup in Germany that finished 8th and in 1905 at the Circuit d'Auvergne in Clermont-Ferrand, he was eliminated in the first round.

Competing in the United States, Wagner won the Vanderbilt Cup of 1906 driving a Darracq model 120 over a Long Island racecourse. He finished fifth in the 1907 Kaiserpreis in Germany but the following year in Savannah won the first ever United States Grand Prix driving a Fiat.

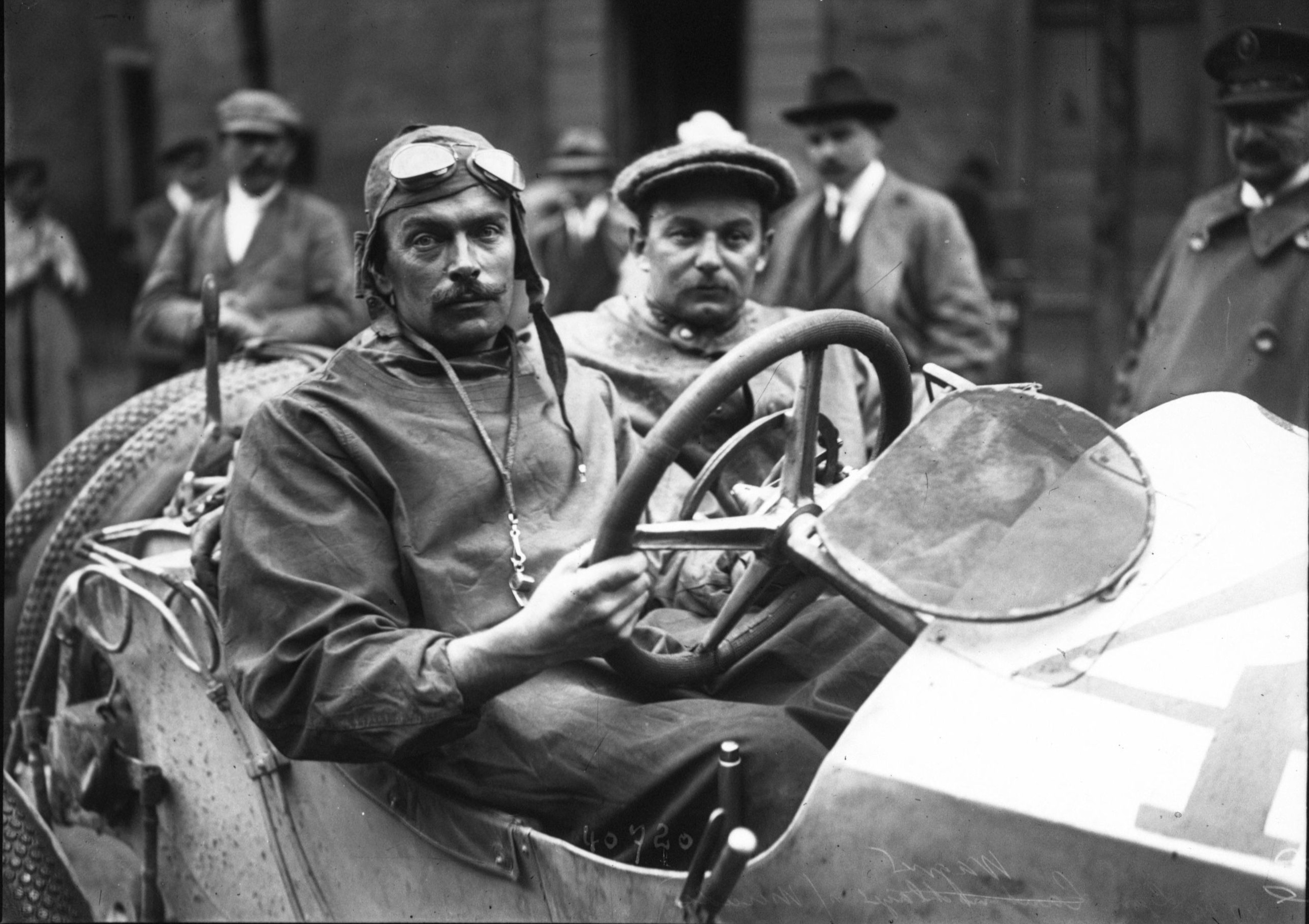
Wagner at the 1914 French Grand Prix in his No.40 Mercedes that finished 2nd

For the July 1914 French Grand Prix at Lyon, German Daimler Motoren Gesellschaft, with Christian Lautenschlager already winner of the 1908 French Grand Prix, prepared months in advance and entered no less than 5 Mercedes 4.5 liter Grand Prix cars, two of them for foreign drivers, Wagner and Belgian Mercedes dealer Théodore Pilette. While multiple French GP winner Boillot was again leading the race, Christian Lautenschlager was leading the chasing Mercedes drivers. When Lautenschlager had a lenghty pitstop, it was Wagner who challenged Boillot for the lead until he himself had to pit. Only weeks before the Great War began, Mercedes triumphed 1-2-3, with Christian Lautenschlager, Wagner, and Otto Salzer, while the cars of Max Sailer and Pilette did not finish.

Wagner served his country during the First World War, fighting in the French Artillery division.

Wagner competed in the 1919 Indianapolis 500 driving a Ballot but went out with a broken wheel on lap 45. In 1924 he drove for the Alfa Romeo team, in a P2 alongside Antonio Ascari and Giuseppe Campari.

In 1926, after relieving Robert Sénéchal on lap 83, Wagner drove to victory in the first ever British Grand Prix. Wagner's Delage 155B had dropped out with mechanical issues on the sixth lap of the 110-lap race.

In August, Wagner won the Grand Prix de la Baule, held on a temporary beach course, in a Delage 2LCV. In addition to Grand Prix racing, Wagner also competed in the 1925 24 Hours of Le Mans together with fellow countryman Charles Flohot in a Ariès Type S GP, they finished sixth overall, and second in class 3.0. In 1927 Wagner came second overall at the Coppa Florio and won his class +3.0 in a Peugeot.

== Aviation ==
Wagner began flying airplanes in 1910. He worked for the Hanriot company flying their monoplanes.

== Later life and death ==
During World War 2, Wagner was diagnosed with tuberculosis of the bone, compelling the amputation of a leg. Wagner was given the post of instructor and supervisor at the Montlhery circuit, but the disease worsened, and by the late 1950s, he was housebound.

In 1955, Wagner was awarded the Legion d'Honneur for distinguished service in the First World War, although it had been delayed 37 years as a criticism of his racing for German manufacturer Daimler Motoren Gesellschaft and its brand Mercedes shortly before the Great War began.

Wagner died on March 13, 1960, at the age of 78 in Montlhéry, France.

== Motorsports career results ==
=== Indianapolis 500 results ===
Year	Car	Start	Qual	Rank	Finish	Laps	Led	Retired
1919	34	13	101.700	3	26	44	0	Broken wheel
Totals						44	0	

Starts	1
Poles	0
Front Row	0
Wins	0
Top 5	0
Top 10	0
Retired	1

== See also ==
- List of pilots awarded an Aviator's Certificate by the Aéro-Club de France in 1910
