= Otto Salzer =

German racing driver (1874–1944)

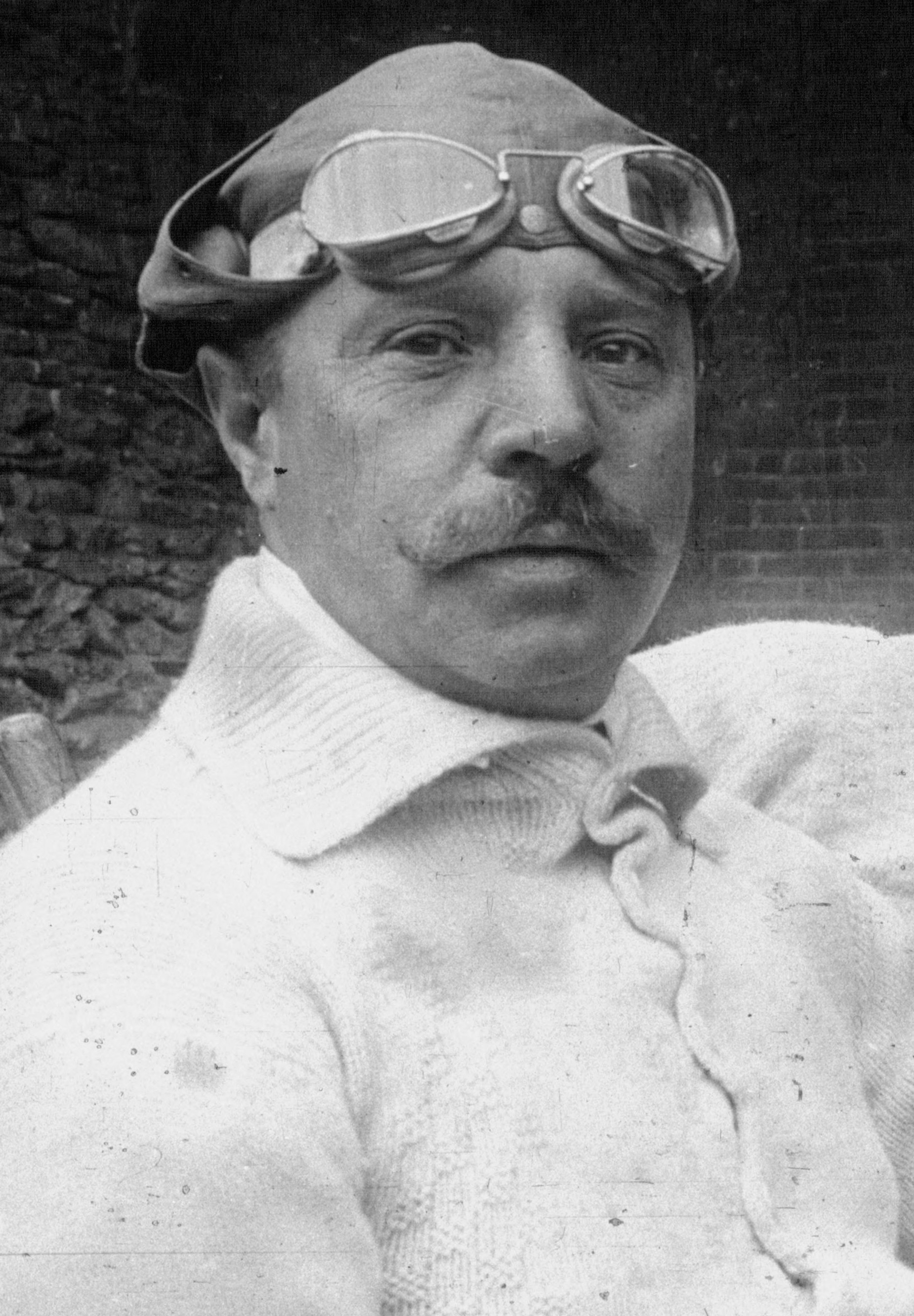
- Otto Salzer at the 1914 French Grand Prix

Personal information
- Nationality: Germany
- Born: 4 April, 1874; Möglingen
- Died: 7 January, 1944 (aged 70); Stuttgart
- Occupation: Racing driver
- Years active: 1906-1922

Otto Salzer (4 April 1874 – 7 January 1944) was a German racing car driver, famous for his contributions to the success of Daimler-Motoren-Gesellschaft in Untertürkheim near Stuttgart, where he became team leader in 1903, previously having worked as an engineer since 1896.

He had some good results, and was one of the first German Grand Prix-drivers when his Mercedes team (with Camille Jenatzy and Victor Hémery) joined the 1907 French Grand Prix. Salzer continued in the 1908 French Grand Prix (with Christian Lautenschlager and Willy Pöge, driving a 140 HP Mercedes), 1914 French Grand Prix (with Louis Wagner), 1906 Circuit des Ardennes, and was also present the 1922 Italian Grand Prix.

He was born in Möglingen, Württemberg and died in Obertürkheim near Stuttgart.
