= Automobili Nazzaro =

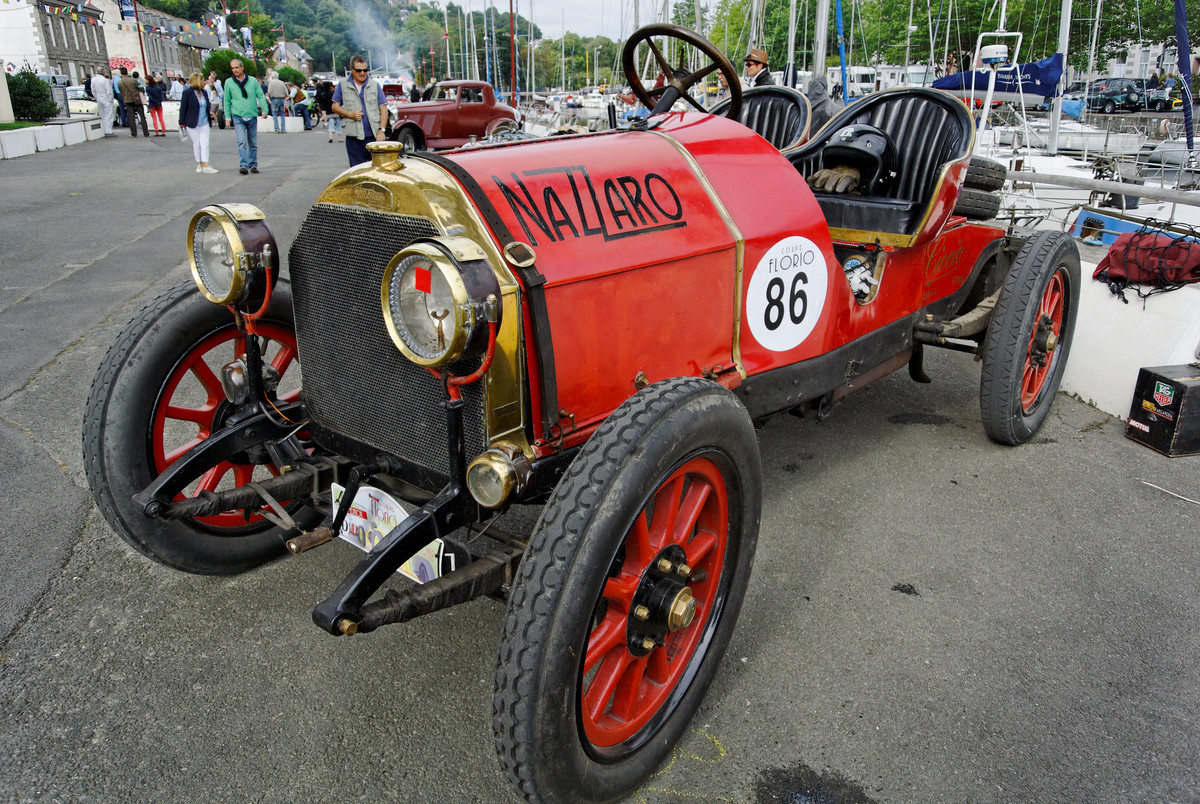
Nazzaro Tipo 3 1913, at the Coupe Florio in 2012

Automobili Nazzaro was an Italian manufacturer of automobiles from 1911 to 1916, and 1919–1923. Founded by racing driver Felice Nazzaro it produced circa 490 vehicles in total and won both the 1913 and 1920 Targa Florios in Sicily.

== Company history ==
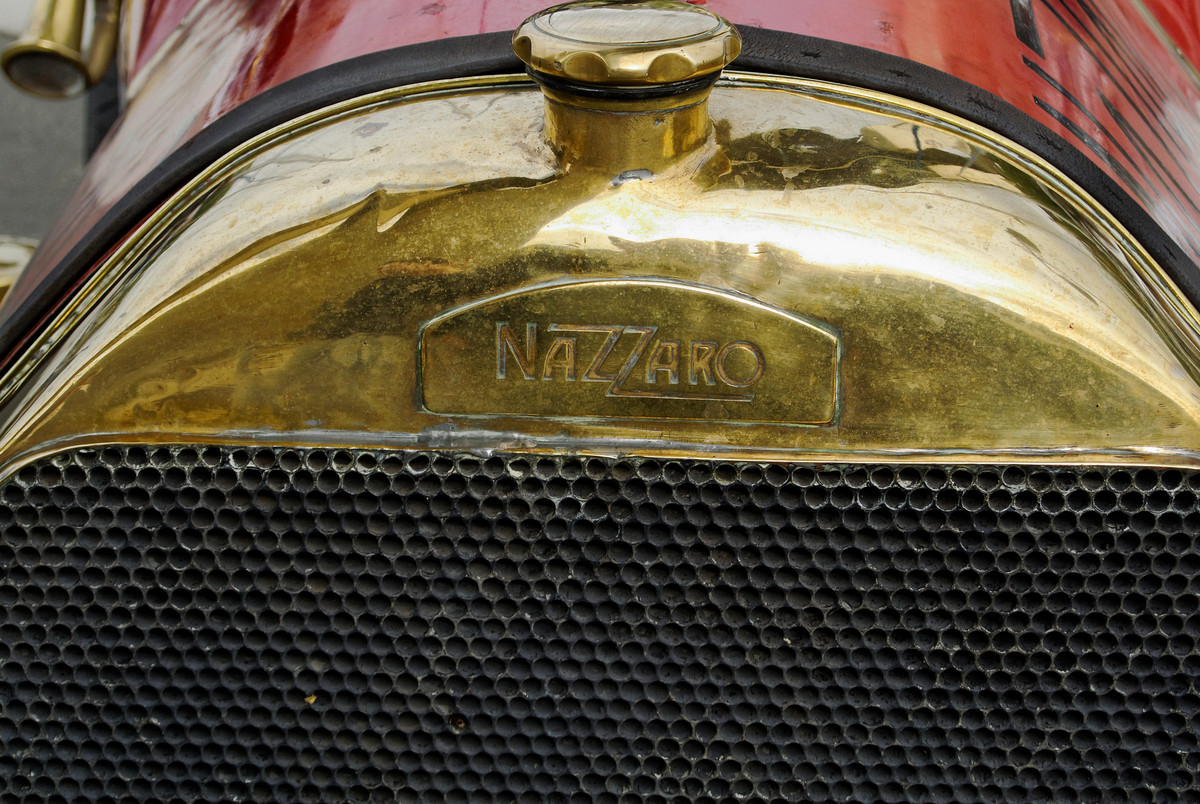

The company, Nazzaro & C. Fabbrica Automobili, was founded in Turin on 1 July 1911 by racing driver Felice Nazzaro, his brother-in-law Pilade Masoero, Maurizio Fabry and Arnold Zoller(de: Arnold Zoller) to produce automobiles with the brand name Nazzaro. In 1916 the company was liquidated and bought by Franco Tosi Meccanica, who founded a new company, Automobili Nazzaro, in Florence after World War 1. Production ended in 1923.

== Vehicles ==
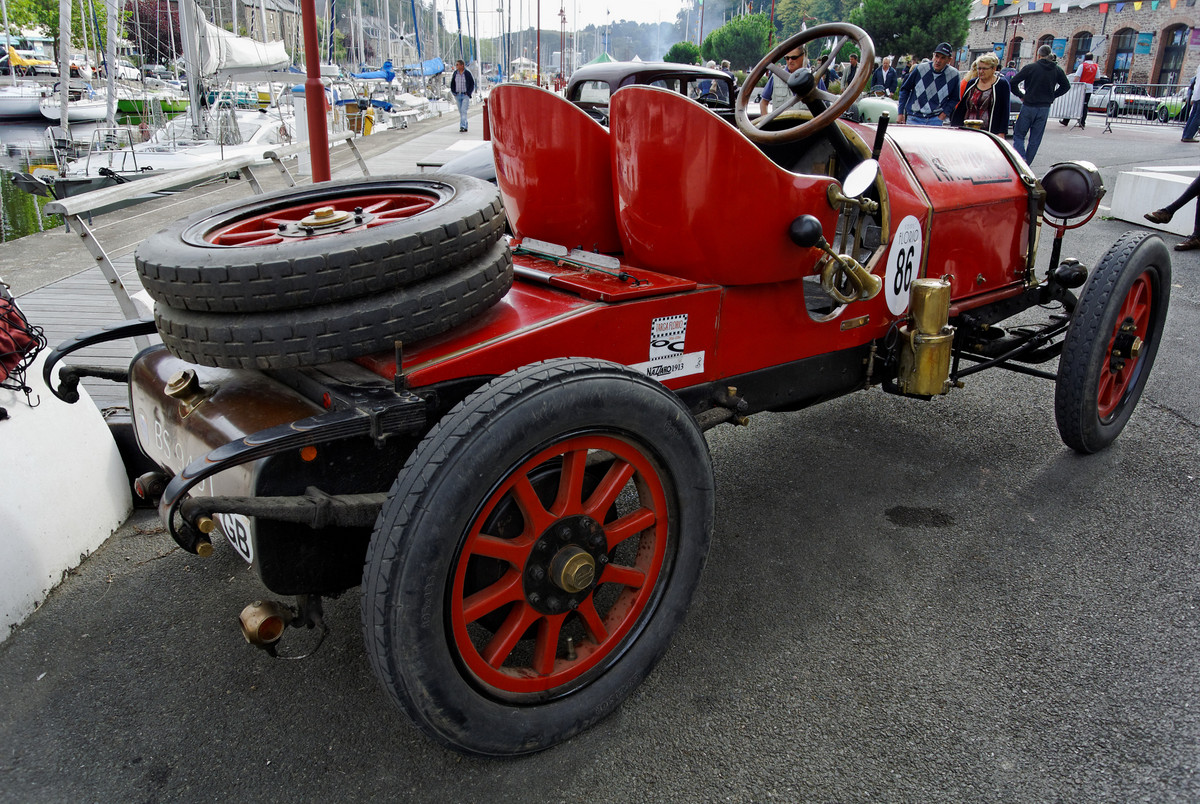
Nazzaro Tipo 3 1913, at the Coupe Florio in 2012

=== Nazzaro & C. Fabbrica Automobili (1913-1916) ===
- The Tipo 1 had a four-cylinder monobloc engine with a displacement of 4.398 litres (268.4 cu in), an output of 70 hp (55 kW) and a four-speed gearbox. It was offered in touring car and sedan body styles. Models were imported to Great Britain by 'Newton & Bennett'.
- The Tipo 2 (or 20/30 HP) had the same engine, but was designed to be sportier, and was available as an open two-seater. The maximum speed was given as 100 kilometres per hour (62 mph).

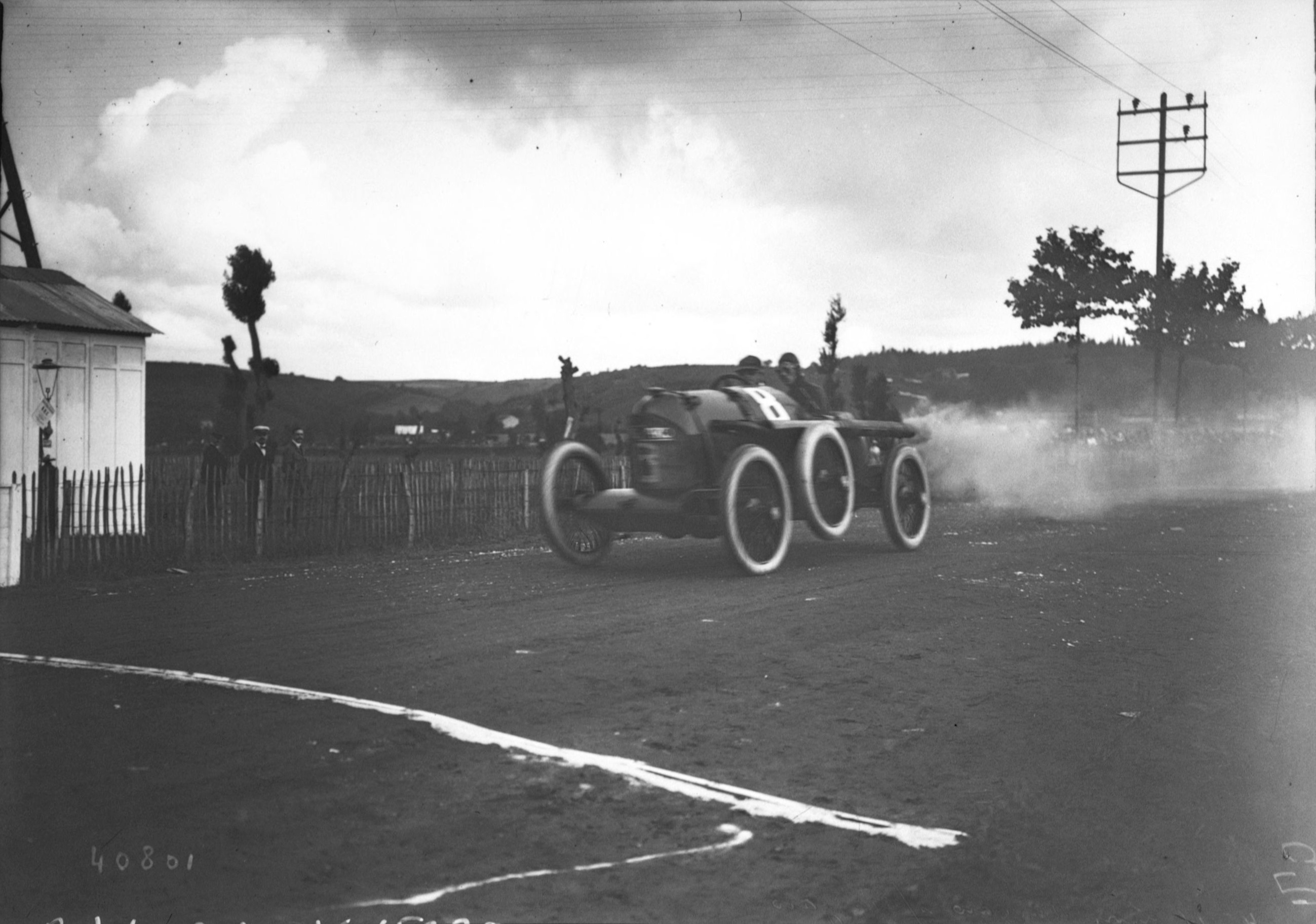
Felice Nazzaro at the 1914 French Grand Prix

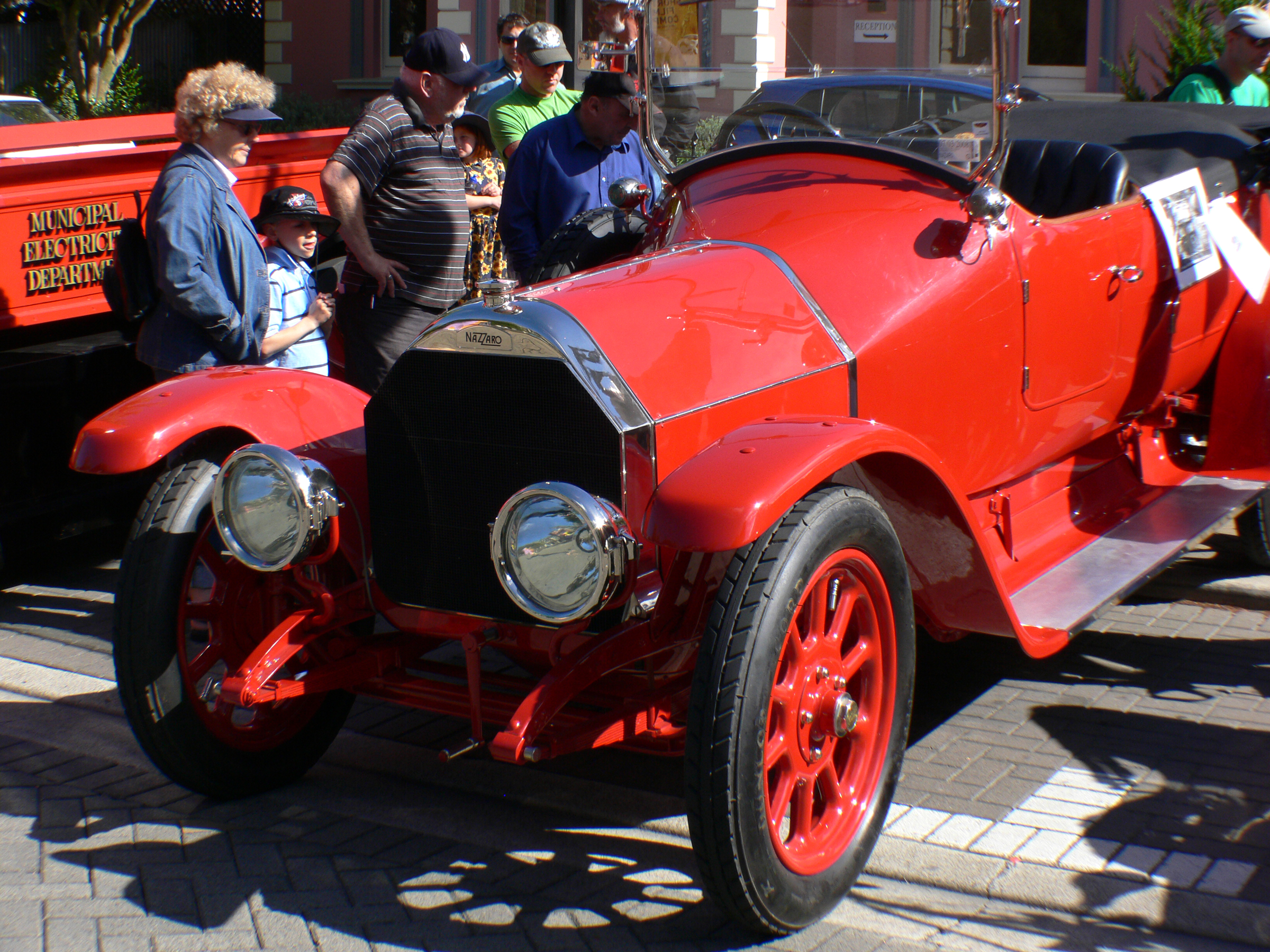
1913 Nazzaro Tipo 3

- The Tipo 3 (or 35 HP) was based on the Tipo 2 but with a more powerful engine. In 1914, a number of racing cars with four-cylinder engines with a displacement of 4500 cc and four valves per cylinder were built for the French Grand Prix. None finished.
- The Tipo 4 was produced before the outbreak of WW1.
- From 1915, as part of WW1 deployment, they produced around 50 trucks using a 10-cylinder Anzani engine.

==== Production ====
In the year 1912, about 20 to 25 vehicles were produced. A total of around 50 trucks and 230 passenger cars were built by 1916.

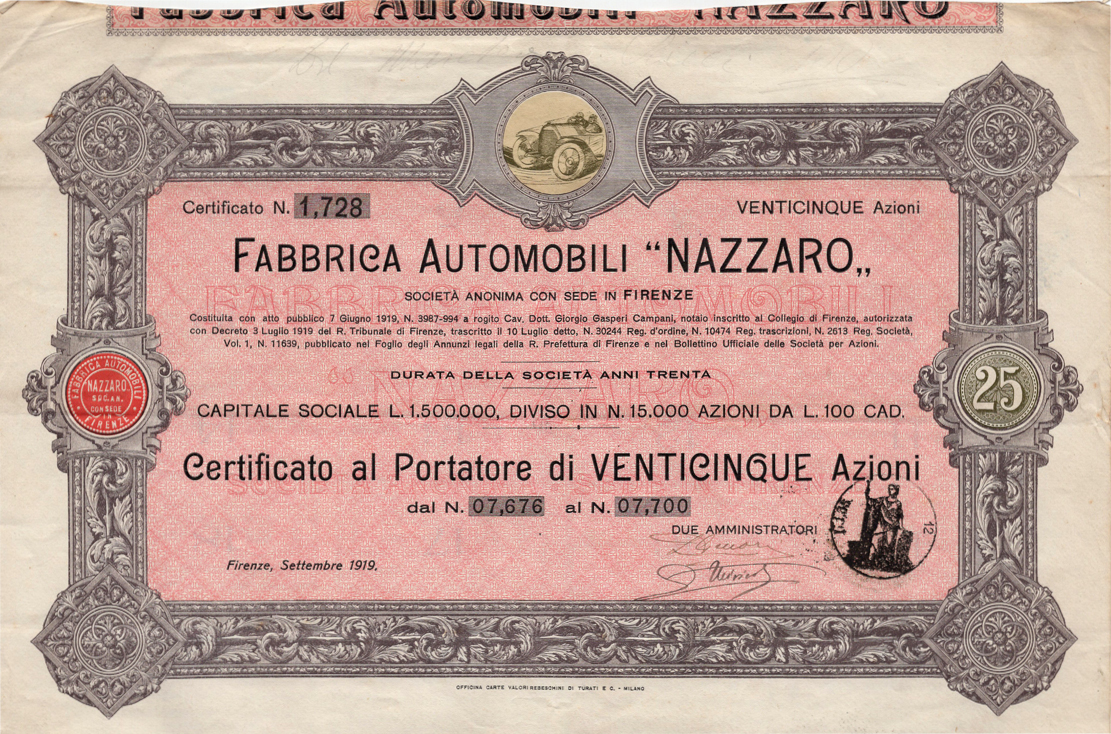
Certificate of Participation of the Fabbrica Automobili Nazzaro since 1919

=== Automobili Nazzaro (1919-1923) ===
The Tipo 5 had a 3.500 litres (213.6 cu in) four-cylinder engine, with overhead camshaft and V-shaped radiator and won the 1920 Targa Florio. From 1922 the engine had two exhaust valves per cylinder.

==== Production ====
A total of around 210 cars were built from 1919 onwards.

== Racing ==
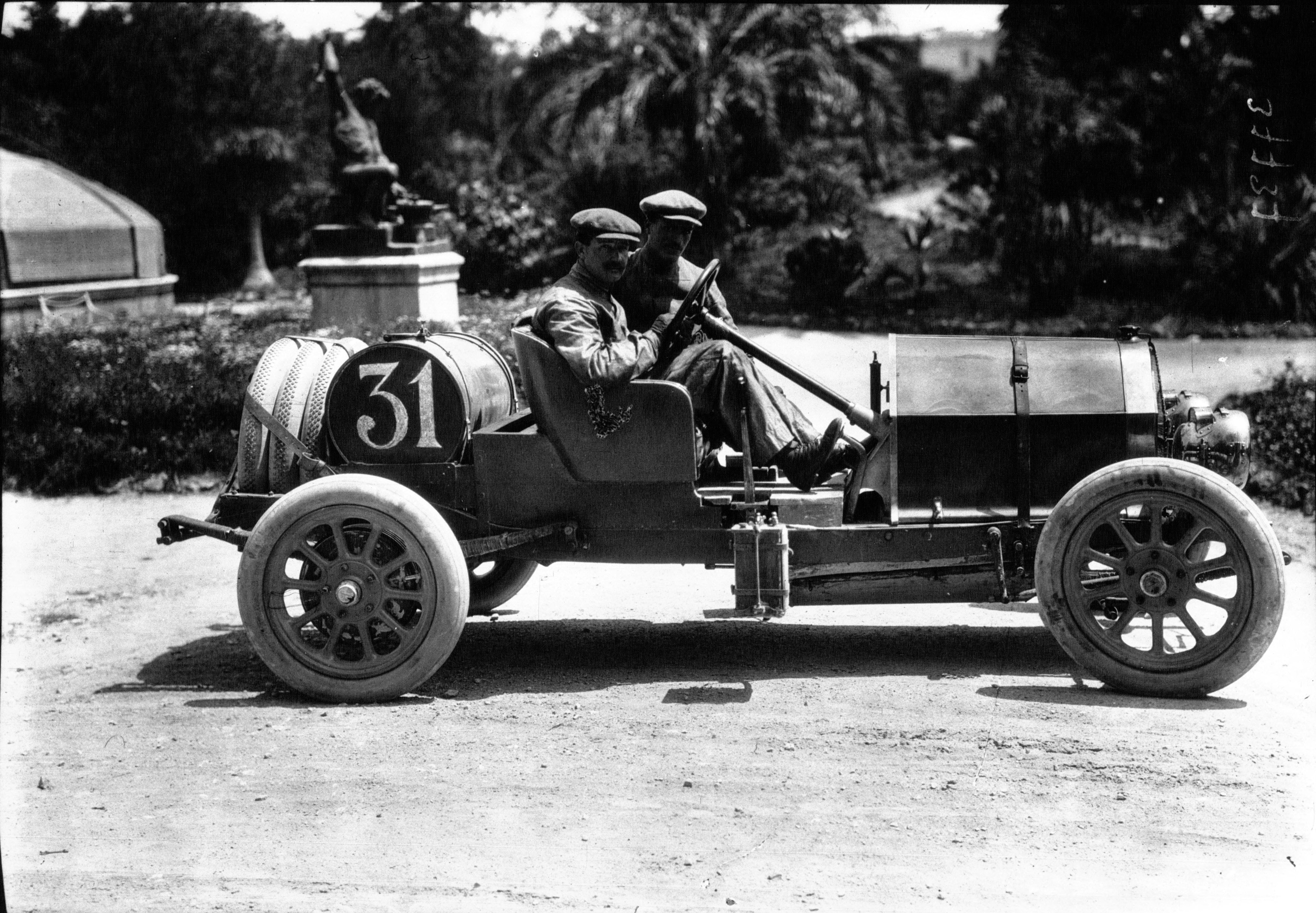
Felice Nazzaro in his Nazzaro at the 1913 Targa Florio

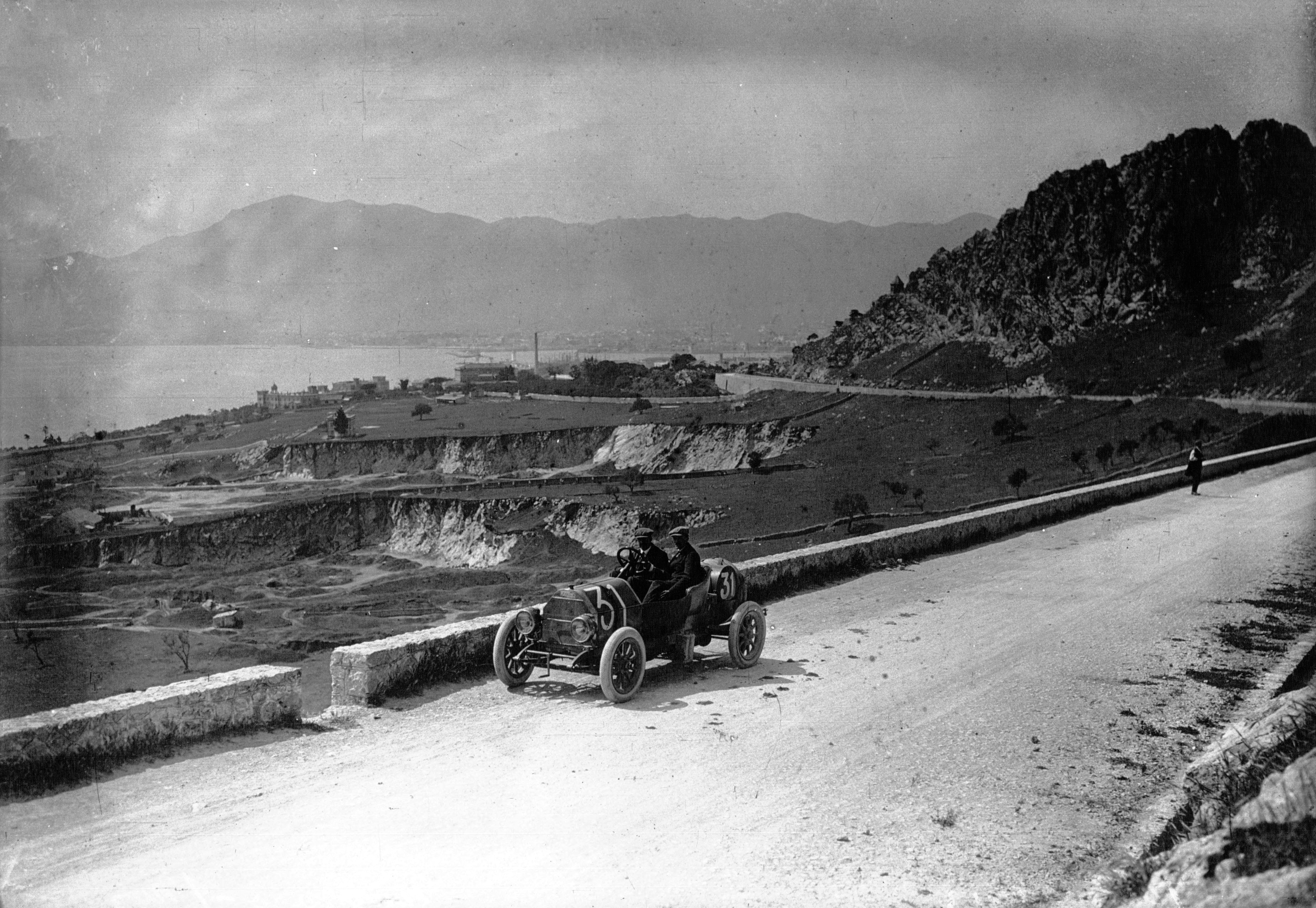
Felice Nazzaro in his Nazzaro at the 1913 Targa Florio

- In 1913 Felice Nazzaro, driving a Tipo 2, won the Targa Florio in Sicily in 19 hours 18 minutes. He completed the single 979 kilometres (608 mi) lap at an average speed of 50.7 kilometres per hour (31.5 mph)
- In 1914 Nazzaro, driving a Tipo 3, won the Coppa Florio on the Madonie mountain circuit in central Sicily in 8 hours 11 minutes. He completed the three 148 kilometres (92 mi) laps at an average speed of 54.5 kilometres per hour (33.9 mph).
- In 1914 Nazzaro entered three specially built cars for the French Grand Prix. They were equipped with 4-cylinder, 16-valve, 4.5 litres (270 cu in) litre engines, with single overhead camshafts. All retired with engine failures.
- In 1920 Guido Meregalli, driving a Nazzaro GP won the Targa Florio, in 8 hours 27 minutes. He completed 432 kilometres (268 mi) at an average speed of 50.92 kilometres per hour (31.64 mph).

== Literature ==
- Harald H. Linz, Halwart Schrader : The International Automobile Encyclopedia . United Soft Media Verlag, Munich 2008, ISBN 978-3-8032-9876-8 .
- George Nick Georgano : The Beaulieu Encyclopedia of the Automobile, Volume 2 G – O. Fitzroy Dearborn Publishers, Chicago 2001, ISBN 1-57958-293-1 (English)
- Collective of authors: Encyclopedia of the Automobile. Brands · Models · Technology. Weltbild Verlag, Augsburg, 1989
- Alex Witula: Carte valori d'epoca Toscana Portafoglio Storico, Bologna 2007, ISBN 978-88-900170-9-4 (Italian)

== See also ==
- List of automobile manufacturers of Italy
