= Dragutin Esser =

French racing driver

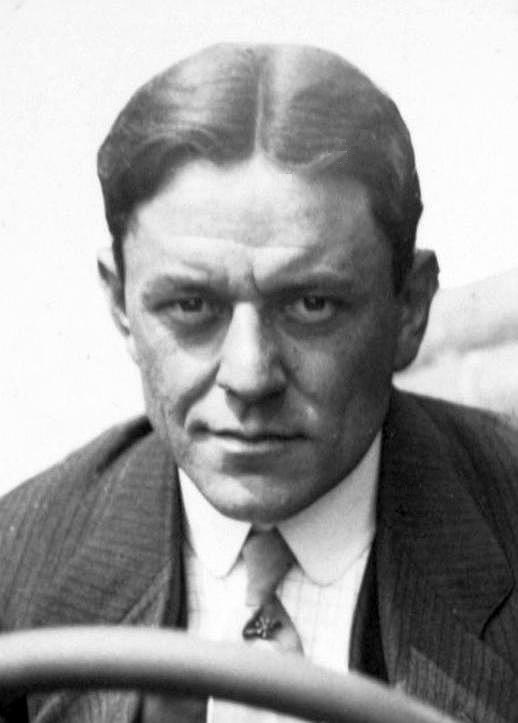
Dragutin Esser at the 1914 French Grand Prix

Dragutin Esser was a French racing driver, driving cars designed or built by Émile Mathis.

The production cars of Mathis driven by Dragutin Esser or by Emile Mathis achieved numerous successes in the touring classes:

Grand Prix du Mans - 1911
Grand Prix de l'A.C.F. - 1913
Tour de France - 1913
and at other venues around Europe including the U.K. and Ireland.

Dragutin Esser designed two cars of 2025cc and 2253cc which were built by Mathis under license from Stoewer.

In July 1914, Esser drove a Nagant on the XIV Grand Prix de l'Automobile Club de France - and finished 6th.
