= Christian Lautenschlager =

German racing driver (1877–1954)

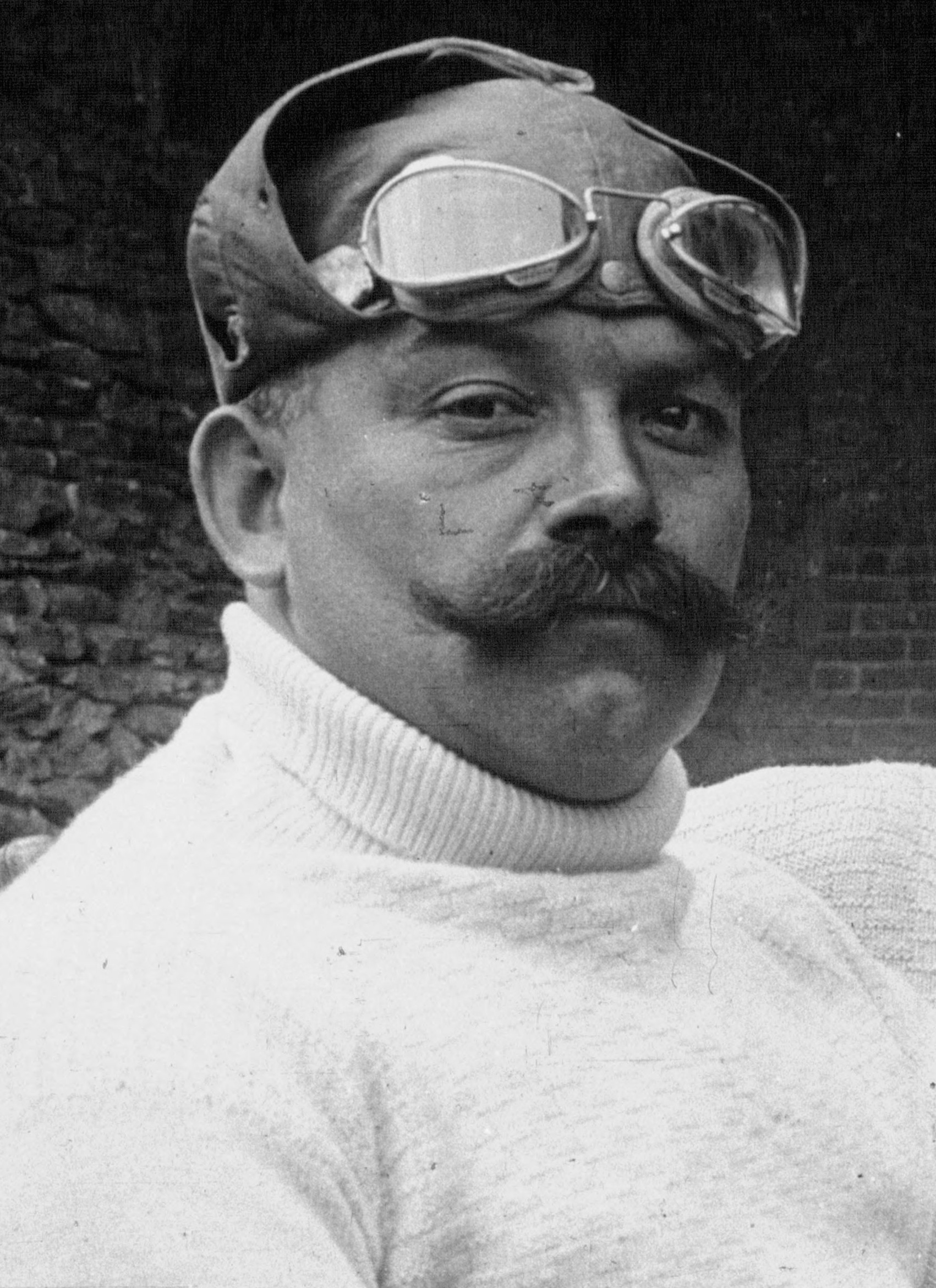
- Lautenschlager wearing Ström Paris goggles at the 1914 French Grand Prix
- Born: Christian Friedrich Lautenschlager; 13 April 1877 Magstadt, Württemberg, German Empire
- Died: 3 January 1954 (aged 76) Untertürkheim, Baden-Württemberg, Germany

Champ Car career
- 1 race run over 1 year
- First race: 1923 Indianapolis 500 (Indianapolis)
Wins	Podiums	Poles
0	0	0

Christian Friedrich Lautenschlager (13 April 1877 – 3 January 1954) was a German machinist and racing driver for Daimler Motoren Gesellschaft. Driving the Mercedes-branded cars, he won the French Grand Prix twice, in 1908 and in July 1914.

== Biography ==
Born in the village of Magstadt, Kingdom of Württemberg, Germany near Stuttgart, Christian Lautenschlager was 14 years old when he began training for a career as a machinist at a company in Stuttgart. After a few jobs, he spent time travelling around Europe, returning to Stuttgart in 1899 at the age 22 where he found work at the Daimler factory. There, he worked his way up to the positions of mechanic and then of test driver for the company's race cars which, due to the name Daimler having been licensed away in various countries, were entered as Mercedes. The two companies of the inventors of the modern automobile, Karl Benz and Gottlieb Daimler, cooperated after the Great War, and since 1926 their products are known as Mercedes-Benz.

For the 1908 French Grand Prix, Lautenschlager was given the opportunity to drive one of three Mercedes Grand Prix race vehicles, and he drove it to victory ahead of two French-driven Benz at Dieppe, France. He returned to his factory job rather than joining the racing circuit as a permanent driver. In 1914, driving a Mercedes 37/95, he raced at the Elgin Road Races in Elgin, Illinois. He raced only a few more times until he achieved even greater fame at Lyon, France, on 4 July 1914, by leading the Mercedes team to a 1-2-3 triumph at the 1914 French Grand Prix. As the assassination in Sarajevo had happened days earlier, international tensions were high, and this was the last Grand Prix before World War I started. Considered one of the great Grand Prix events in motor-racing history, 37 cars from 13 manufacturers in six different countries competed in the 1914 French Grand Prix race that for the first time had a limit on the size of the engine allowed, set at 4.5 litres. Against a top field led by Frenchman Georges Boillot, who had won the race the past two years, after seven gruelling hours, Lautenschlager took victory in the prestigious event for the second time.

In the early 1920s, when Lautenschlager was in his 40s, he raced on a semi-regular basis but without much success. He competed in the 1922 Targa Florio, finishing in tenth place. In 1923, he travelled to the United States to compete in the 1923 Indianapolis 500 as part of a three-car Mercedes team. Driving vehicles equipped with the first supercharged engine in the race's history, their effort proved less than successful and Lautenschlager finished 23rd. The following year brought no victories for him, but other Mercedes drivers, and he retired from racing.

Christian Lautenschlager worked for Daimler until his retirement. He died at the age of 76 in Untertürkheim, a suburb of Stuttgart.

== Motorsport career results ==
=== Indianapolis 500 results ===
Year	Car	Start	Qual	Rank	Finish	Laps	Led	Retired
1923	14	17	93.200	13	23	14	0	Crash T1
Totals						14	0	

Starts	1
Poles	0
Front Row	0
Wins	0
Top 5	0
Top 10	0
Retired	1
