= Alva (automobile) =

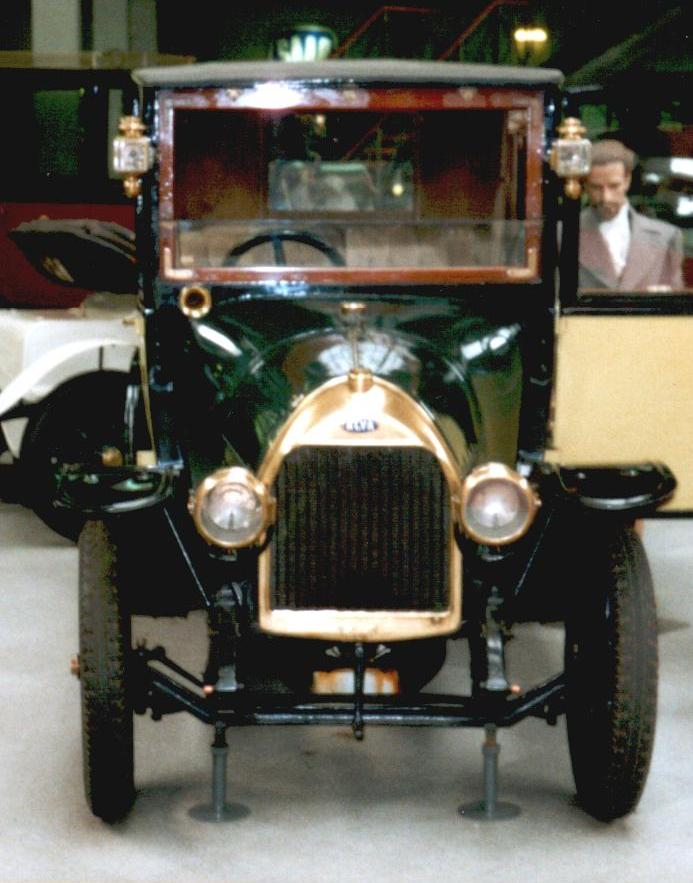

Overview
- Manufacturer: Alva
- Production: 1913–1923

Body and chassis
- Class: Light car
- Layout: FR layout

Powertrain
- Engine: 4-cylinder engines, 1200–2000 cc
- Transmission: 3-speed manual

Alva was a French range of cars made by Automobiles Alva, in Courbevoie, Seine, from 1913 to 1923.

Some of the line-up of cars had 4-cylinder engines made by SCAP, while others had engines ranging from 1.5 to 2.2-litre capacity. They were conventional in design, aside from the Perrot 4-wheel brakes introduced in 1921, and some models that had an overhead camshaft engine.
