= Aquila Italiana =

Defunct Italian automobile manufacturer

- Industry: Automotive
- Founded: 1906
- Defunct: 1917
- Fate: ceased production, taken over by the SPA
- Headquarters: Turin, Italy
- Products: Automobiles

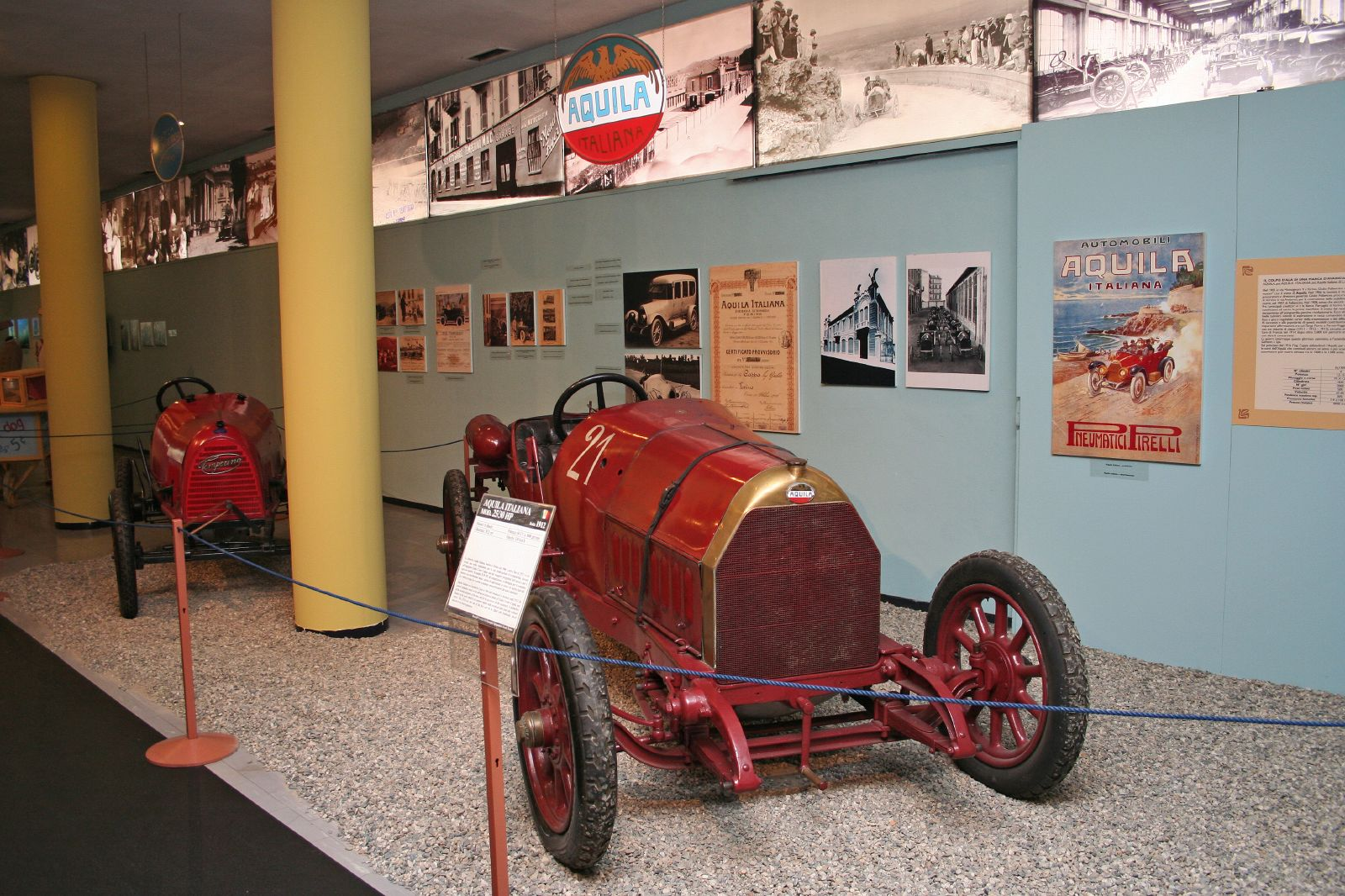
Aquila Italiana 25/30 HP (1912)

Aquila Italiana (founded as the Società Anonima Aquila and quickly renamed the Società Anonima Italiana Aquila) was an Italian automobile manufacturer from 1906 to 1917. The company was renamed again in 1909 to Aquila Anonima Italiana di L. Marsaglia after it was bought by a state – the Marsaglia part came from the name of the bank owner's son (Vincenzo Marsaglia, a talented automobile driver).

Designed by Giulio Cesare Cappa, the cars were big four- and six-cylinder models with ioe engines of an advanced type. There was an interruption in construction after 1908, but the company introduced new models in 1911; these featured 4192 cc six-cylinder engines and proved to be successful in many races. Among Aquila Italiana drivers were Meo Constantini (later to join Bugatti at Molsheim, where he became first a racing driver and later the Chef d'Equipe) and Carlo Masetti (Count Giulio Masetti's elder brother).

== Production ==
In the year 1911, 55 vehicles were manufactured. The company Aquila Italiana produced approximately 1,500 cars (across all models).

Technical specifications Cars produced by "Aquila Anonima Italiana di L. Marsaglia"
Type	15/20 HP	40/50 HP	25/30 HP	K-12/15 HP	H4-20/30 HP	H6-35/50
Displacement	2,797 cc (170.7 cu in)	7,432 cc (453.5 cu in)	3,921 cc (239.3 cu in)	1,847 cc (112.7 cu in)	2,614 cc (159.5 cu in)	3,921 cc (239.3 cu in)
Cylinders	4	4	6	4	4	6
Bore mm	90	130	80	70	80	80
Stroke mm	110	140	130	120	130	130
rpm	1500	1200	3600	2000	1800	1800
Valves	Side	Side	Mixed	At the top	At the top	At the top
Ignition	magneto	magneto	magneto	magneto	magneto	magneto
Gears	4+ RM	4+ RM	4+ RM	4+ RM	4+ RM	4 + RM
Transmission	cardan	cardan	cardan	cardan	cardan	cardan
Wheelbase	2,500 mm (98.4 in)	2,900 mm (114.2 in)	3,055 mm (120.3 in)	2,600 mm (102.4 in)	2,850 mm (112.2 in)	3,050 mm (120.1 in)
Track	1,250 mm (49.2 in)	1,400 mm (55.1 in)	1,445 mm (56.9 in)	1,300 mm (51.2 in)	1,440 mm (56.7 in)	1,440 mm (56.7 in)
Production	1909-11	1909-11	1909-12	1913-17	1912-17	1913-17

== See also ==
- List of Italian companies
