= Pic-Pic =

Defunct Swiss automobile manufacturer

Piccard-Pictet
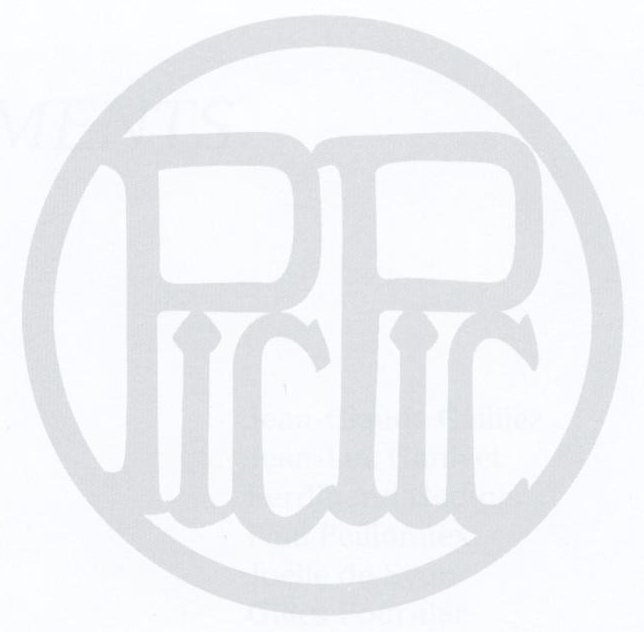
- Industry: Automotive
- Predecessor: Société d’Automobiles à Genève (SAG)
- Founded: 1910; 116 years ago
- Founder: Lucien Pictet (1864 -1928); Paul Piccard (1844–1929)
- Defunct: 1920; 106 years ago
- Successor: Ateliers des Charmilles SA.
- Headquarters: Geneva
- Products: Cars , trucks

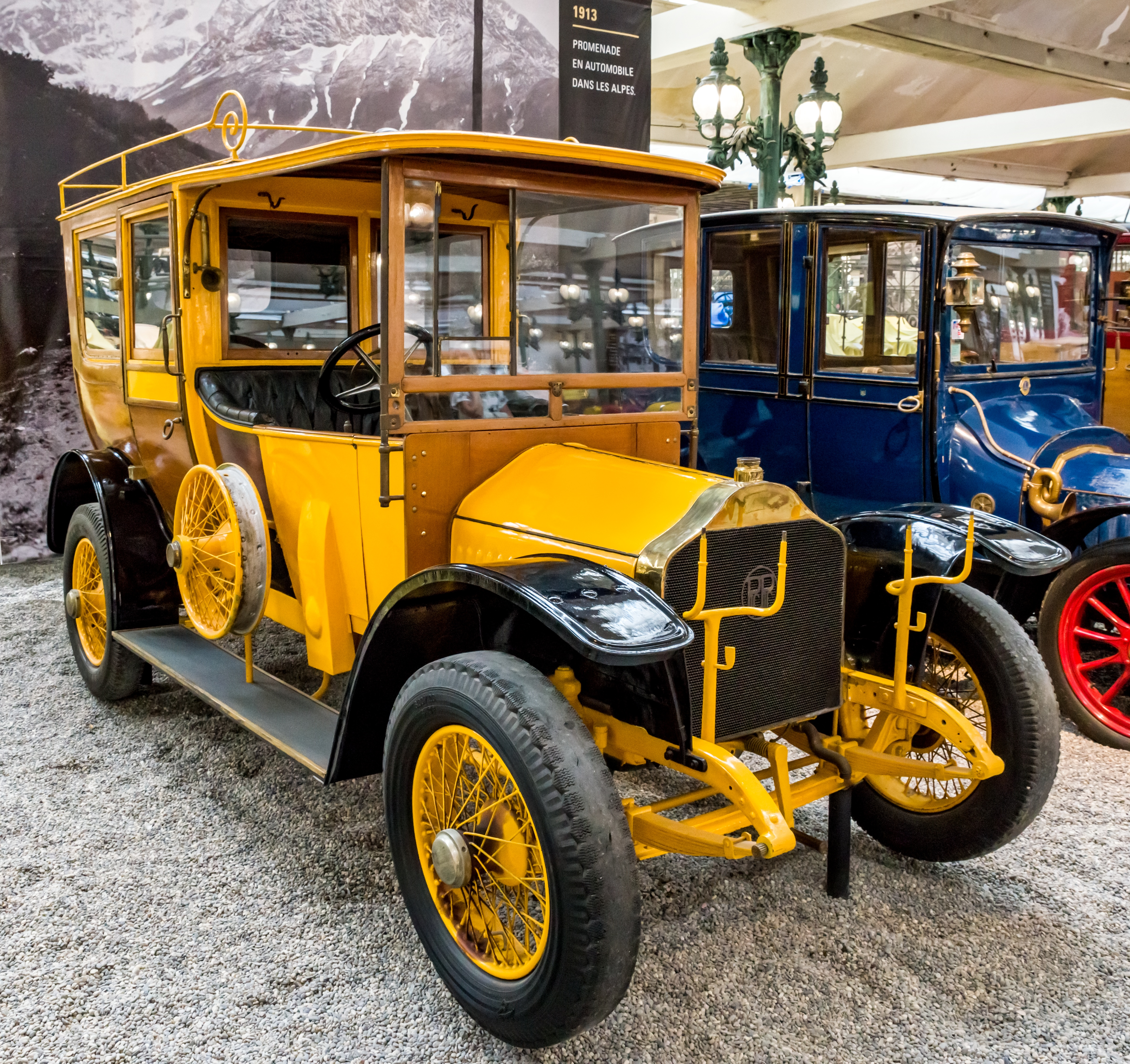
1911 Piccard-Pictet Type 18

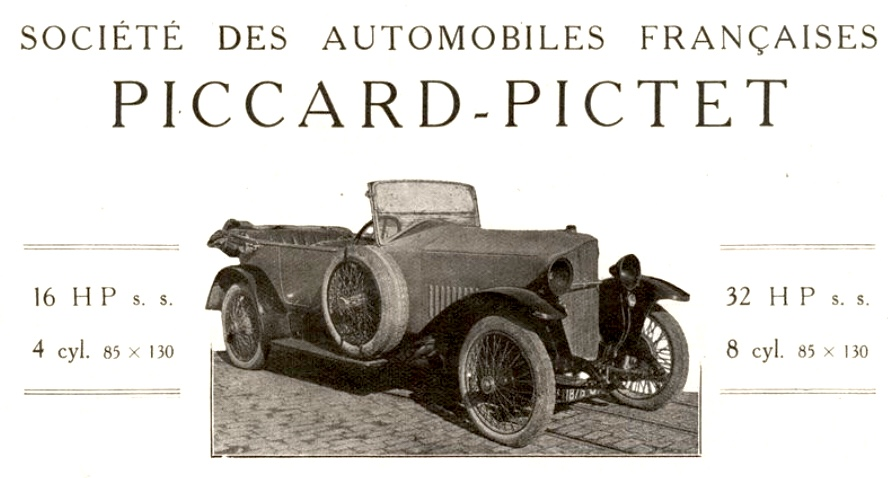
1919 Piccard-Pictet advertisement

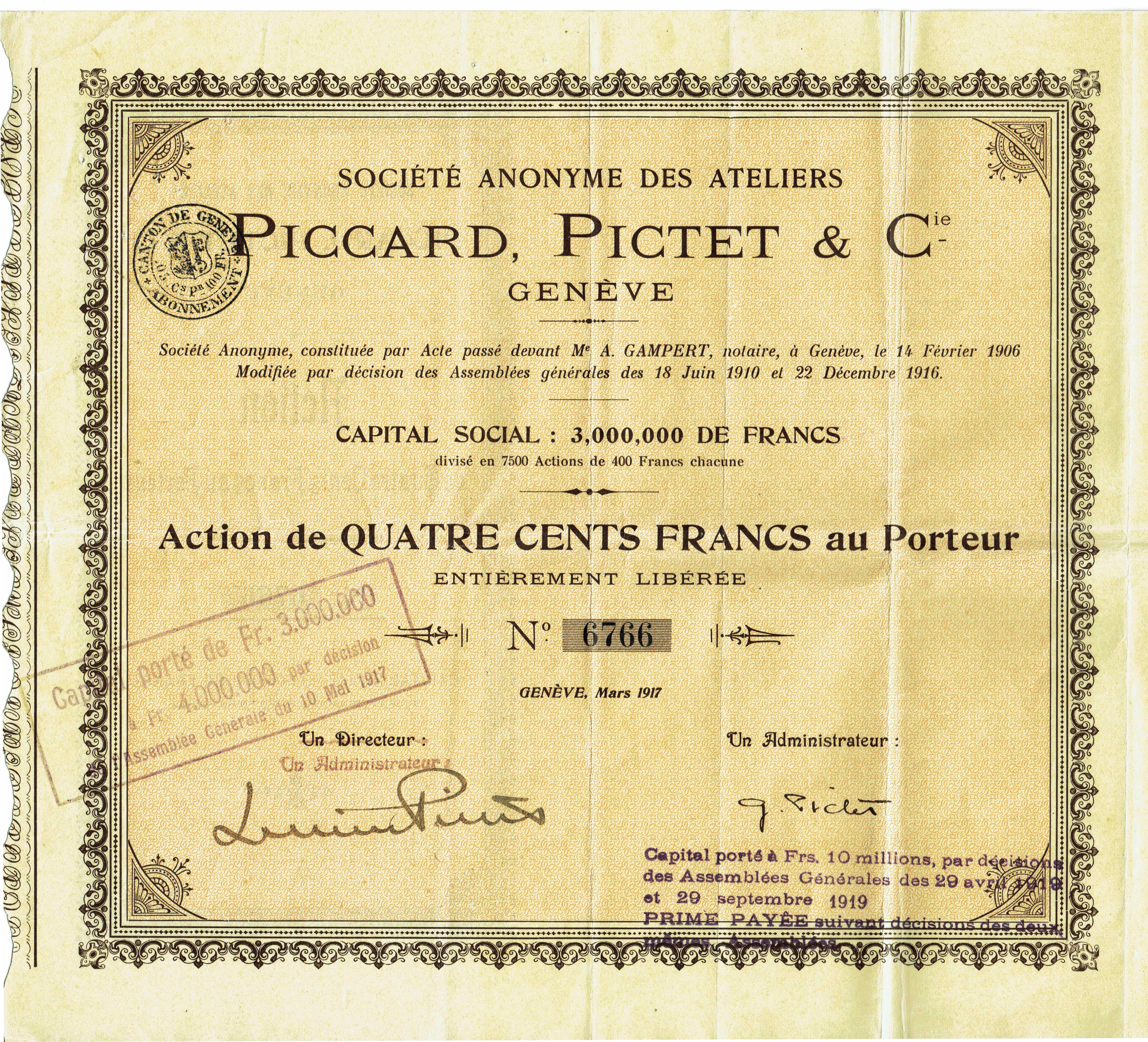
Share of the SA des Ateliers Piccard, Pictet & Cie, issued March 1917

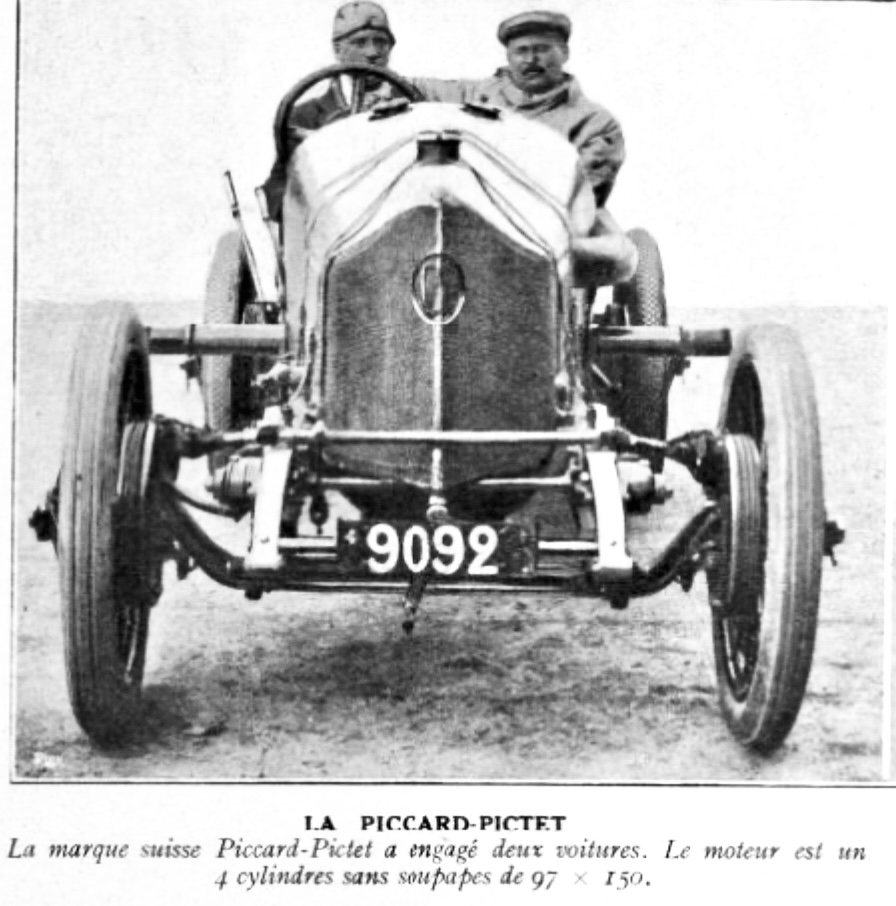
Pic-Pic racing car (1914)

Pic-Pic was a Swiss automobile manufactured in Geneva from 1906 to 1924. They were produced by the Piccard-Pictet Company (whence its name derives) until 1920, and by Gnome et Rhône from 1920 until the demise of the marque in 1924.

== History ==
Pic-Pics were made from 1906 to 1924. Pic-Pic originated as the automotive branch of the Geneva engineering firm Ateliers Piccard-Pictet & Cie. The vehicles were noted for precision engineering and luxury; two custom open-top limousines built in 1912 for the visit of Kaiser Wilhelm II gained national fame. The 332 Pic-Pics sold in 1913 made it the best-selling car of the year in Switzerland.

The brand's prominence peaked during World War I when the Swiss Army favored them for their reliable engines. Although the Federal Council of Switzerland banned the production of weapons for foreign countries at the start of the war, the car manufacturer Piccard-Pictet & Cie. became a munitions manufacturer during the First World War. This resulted from the Swiss economy, which was paralyzed in the first months of the war. The borders were strictly guarded, and the economy lacked raw materials. With armaments production, Pic-Pic was also able to make profits again. Due to the shortage of labor, the Federal Council even relaxed the factory law: working hours could be extended to over eleven hours per day. However, after WWI economic downturn coupled with the rise of assembly-line car manufacture in other countries drove the company into financial difficulty. An attempt to move car manufacture to France failed.

Following bankruptcy in 1920, the brand was acquired by the Gnome et Rhône engine company, which made cars from the remaining parts in stock. Production ceased in 1924, when the final models were exhibited at the Geneva Motor Show. Only three Pic-Pics are known to survive today.

== Models ==
Year	Model	cylinders	bore (mm)	stroke (mm)	displacement (cc)	horsepower	wheelbase (mm)	Body Style
1910	14/16	4						
1910	20/24	4	100	130	5309	36		
1910	35/45	4						
1911	truck 4,65 t	4	105	160	8445			
1912	14	4	80	120	3619		2896	
1912	18	4	90	130	4778		2896	
1912	22/30	4	100	140	6158		3048	
1912	25	4	100	150	7069		3048	
1912	35/45	4	130	150	9189		3175	
1913	16/20	4			2950	50	3124	Sleeve valve engine design Baillie Peter Burt and James Harry Keighly McCollum
1913	20/30	4						
1913	30/40	4						
1914	race car	4	97	150	6857	~ 130	2650	
1915								
1916								
1917								
1918		4	70	140	4310			
		4	90	170	8171			
1919	16	4	85	130	4513		3230 or 3430	
1919	28	8	85	130	9026		3550 or 3809	

== Motorsport ==
Pic-Pics competed in a number of motorsports within their short existence. Two Pic-Pics with 4.5-litre engines and front-wheel brakes competed in the 1914 Grand Prix, but both cars were withdrawn. In hillclimbing events, Pic-Pics competed more successfully. Pic-Pic cars came first in Vosges in 1909, in Bern in 1911, and in Jaunpass in 1912, 1913, and 1914.
