= Mercedes 37/95 =

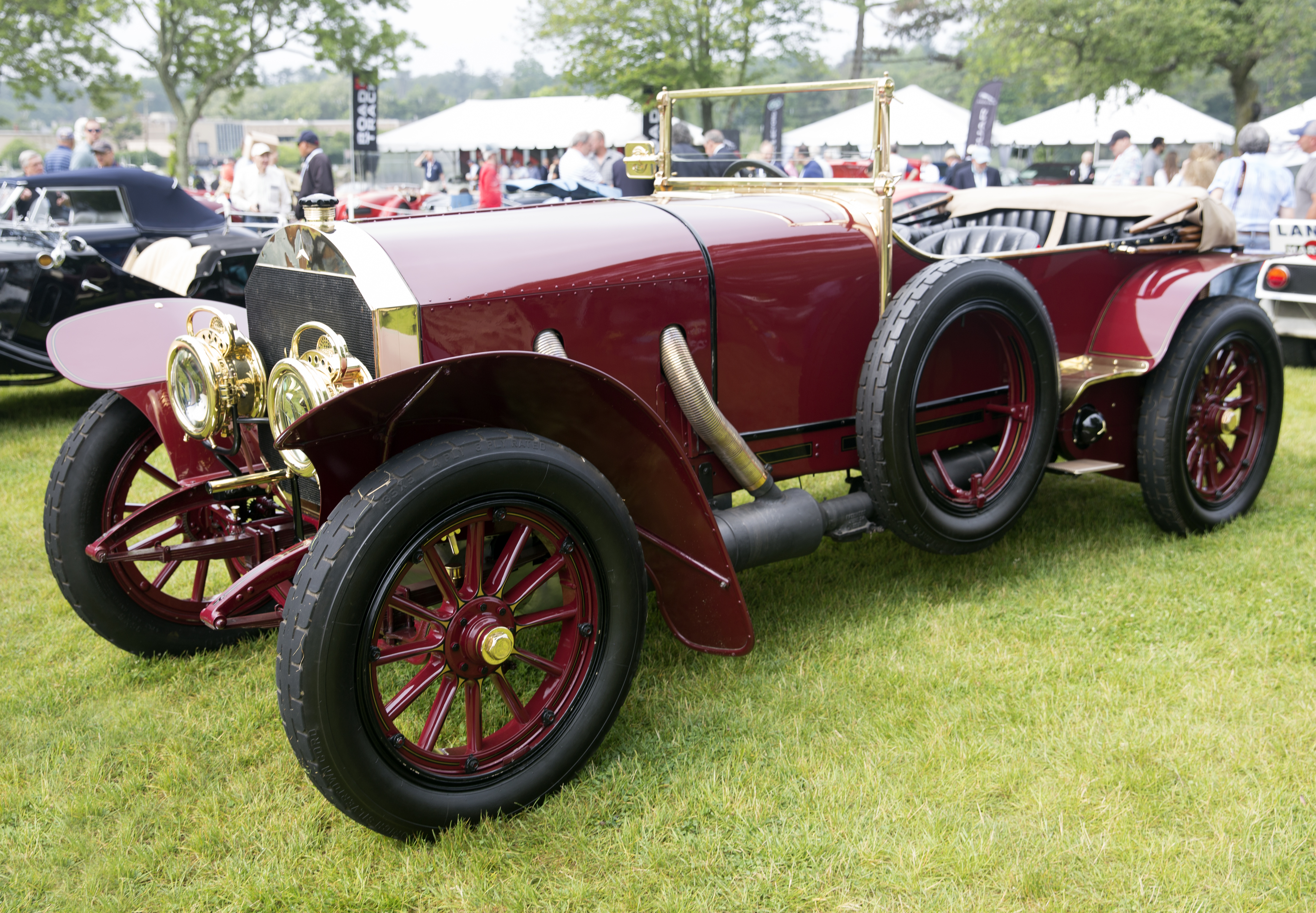
A vintage Mercedes tour car in 1911

The Mercedes 37/95 was an early touring car first built in 1910–11 by Mercedes as the 37/90 and produced commercially from 1913 as the 37/95. It had a Daimler four cylinder 9.5 litre engine generating 90–95 horsepower, which provided power to the rear wheels by chain drive allowing the car to reach 71 mph (115 km/h).

The body was designed by French Labourdette coach company and the engine was designed by Paul Daimler. It was the last chain-driven car produced by Daimler-Motoren-Gesellschaft. The 90 h.p. engine, combined with a four speed manual transmission, allowed the car to reach a top speed of 70 mph while weighing 4,300 lb. While powerful, the car was also built for luxury and comfort. Ferdinand I of Bulgaria ordered a 37/90 luxury saloon model, one of few with enclosed bodywork, in 1912. A year and a half after the 37/90 was redesignated as the 37/95, the engine's displacement was increased to 9.8 liters, upon which it was given a new designation reflecting the increased engine size and horsepower, the 38/100. DMG ceased production of the 38/100 in 1915.

== Racing ==
The 37/95 won a number of races, including the Elgin Trophy and the Vanderbilt Cup. The car was known for some time as the most powerful car in the world.
