= 1912 French Grand Prix =

Race details
- Date: 25–26 June 1912
- Official name: Grand Prix de l'Automobile Club de France
- Location: Dieppe, France
- Course: Public roads
- Course length: 76.989 km (47.840 miles)
- Distance: 20 laps, 1539.778 km (956.800 miles)

Fastest lap
Driver	(United States) David Bruce-Brown	Fiat S74
- Time: 36:32.0

Podium
First	(France) Georges Boillot	Peugeot
Second	(France) Louis Wagner	Fiat
Third	(France) Victor Rigal	Sunbeam

The 1912 French Grand Prix was a Grand Prix motor race held at Dieppe on 25–26 June 1912.

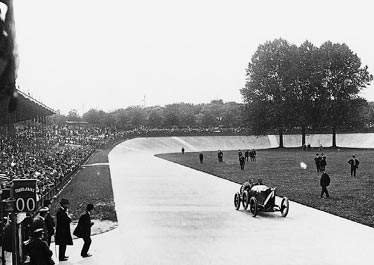
Georges Boillot celebrating his win at the 1912 French Grand Prix

== The Race ==
The race was run over two days with the drivers completing ten laps on each day and their times being aggregated to produce the winner (similar to a modern stage rally). Coupe de l'Auto cars competed alongside Grand Prix cars. The coupe cars were limited to 3-litre engines (183 cubic inches). The only restriction on the Grand Prix cars was that cars must be no wider than 1.75 metres (1.91 yards). Riding mechanic Jean Bassignano was killed in a crash on the third lap when his driver Léon Collinet put a wheel off and flipped. 47 cars started the race at 30 second intervals, with Victor Rigal's Sunbeam the first to start.

Victor Hémery, driving a Lorraine-Dietrich, was the first to complete a lap, but David Bruce-Brown's Fiat led on time after the first lap and retained the lead overnight, more than two minutes ahead of Georges Boillot's Peugeot. Louis Wagner was third at the halfway stage. During the second day, Bruce-Brown was disqualified for refuelling away from the pits on lap 15, giving Boillot a comfortable victory by over thirteen minutes from Wagner.

The Sunbeams performed well in the Coupe de l'Auto race, with Rigal finishing in first place, Resta second, and Medinger third. Due to their speed they were also placed in third, fourth, and fifth places in the Grand Prix itself, beating many more powerful machines. Rigal averaged 65.35 m.p.h. (105.2 km/h) over the 956 miles (1540 kilometres), only 3 m.p.h. (5 km/h) less than Boillot in his 7.6-litre Peugeot (464 cubic inches).

== Classification ==
Pos	No	Driver	Car	Laps	Time/Retired
1	22	(France) Georges Boillot	Peugeot	20	13:58:02.6
2	23	(France) Louis Wagner	Fiat S74		+13:05.8
3	3	(France) Victor Rigal	Sunbeam		+40:33.4
4	17	(United Kingdom) Dario Resta	Sunbeam		+41:49.2
5	52	(France) Emile Medinger	Sunbeam		+2:01:38.8
6	50	(Belgium) Josef Christiaens	Excelsior		+2:25:36.2
7	20	(France) René Croquet	Th. Schneider		+3:33:36.6
8	30	(France) "Anford"/ (France) Pilain	Rolland-Pilain		+3:51:29.4
9	36	(United Kingdom) Richard Wyse	Arrol-Johnston		+4:09:16.6
10	40	(Belgium) Arthur Duray	Alcyon		+4:30:53.0
11	32	(France) Paul Vonlatum	Vinot-Deguignand		+5:07:57.4
12	12	(France) Dragutin Esser	Mathis		+5:20:02.4
13	29	(France) Cyril de Vere	Cote		+6:59:03.4
14	28	(United Kingdom) James Reid	Arrol-Johnston	19	+1 Lap
Ret	33	(United Kingdom) Percy Lambert	Vauxhall	18	Radiator
Ret	55	(United Kingdom) A. Crossman	Arrol-Johnston	17	Radiator
Ret	7	(France) Georges Sizaire	Sizaire-Naudin	17	Lost a wheel
Ret	14	(France) Pierre Garcet	Calthorpe	16	Engine
Ret	27	Page	Alcyon	16	Crash
Ret	51	(United Kingdom) John Hancock	Vauxhall	15	Engine
Ret	38	(France) Thomas Schweitzer	Sizaire-Naudin	10	Engine
Ret	21	(France) Eugène Renaux	Gregoire	10	Withdrawn
Ret	24	(France) Mario Romano	Gregoire	10	Withdrawn
Ret	34	(France) René Hanriot	Lorraine-Dietrich	10	Fire
Ret	18	(France) Philippe de Marne	Gregoire	8	Steering
Ret	4	(France) Barriaux	Alcyon	8	Engine
Ret	56	(France) Lucien Molon	Vinot-Deguignand	7	No oil
Ret	47	(France) René Thomas	Lion-Peugeot L3	7	Engine
Ret	19	(France) Louis Naudin	Sizaire-Naudin	7	
Ret	16	(France) Gustave Caillois	Sunbeam	7	Engine
Ret	45	(Italy) Paul Zuccarelli	Peugeot L-76	7	Ignition
Ret	31	(France) Paul Bablot	Lorraine-Dietrich	7	Engine
Ret	25	(United Kingdom) Frank Rollason	Singer	6	Engine
Ret	39	(United Kingdom) Bramwell Heywood	Singer	5	Crash
Ret	26	(United Kingdom) L G Hornsted	Calthorpe	5	Gearbox
Ret	9	(France) René Champoiseau	Th. Schneider	4	
Ret	8	(France) Léon Molon	Vinot-Deguignand	3	No oil
Ret	54	(United Kingdom) William Watson	Vauxhall	2	Engine
Ret	10	(France) Léon Collinet	Gregoire	2	Crash
Ret	41	(France) Fernand Gabriel	Cote	1	Universal joint
Ret	57	Stefan Heim	Lorraine-Dietrich	1	Engine
Ret	11	(France) Victor Hémery	Lorraine-Dietrich	1	Engine
Ret	49	(France) Albert Guyot	Rolland-Pilain	1	Engine
DQ	37	(United States) David Bruce-Brown	Fiat S74	15	Refuelling away from pits
DQ	42	(United States) Ralph DePalma	Fiat S74	7	Work away from pits
DQ	13	(France) Jules Goux	Peugeot L-76	3	Refuelling away from pits
DQ	43	(United Kingdom) Fred Burgess	Calthorpe	1	Too slow

Grand Prix Race
Previous race: None	1912 Grand Prix season Grandes Épreuves	Next race: None
Previous race: 1908 French Grand Prix	French Grand Prix	Next race: 1913 French Grand Prix
