= 1913 French Grand Prix =

Race details
- Date: 12 July 1913
- Official name: Grand Prix de l'Automobile Club de France
- Location: Amiens, France
- Course: Public roads
- Course length: 31.62 km (19.650 miles)
- Distance: 29 laps, 916.98 km (569.850 miles)

Fastest lap
Driver	(France) Paul Bablot	Delage
- Time: 15:22.0

Podium
First	(France) Georges Boillot	Peugeot
Second	(France) Jules Goux	Peugeot
Third	(France) Jean Chassagne	Sunbeam

The 1913 French Grand Prix was a Grand Prix motor race held at Amiens on 12 July 1913.

== The race ==
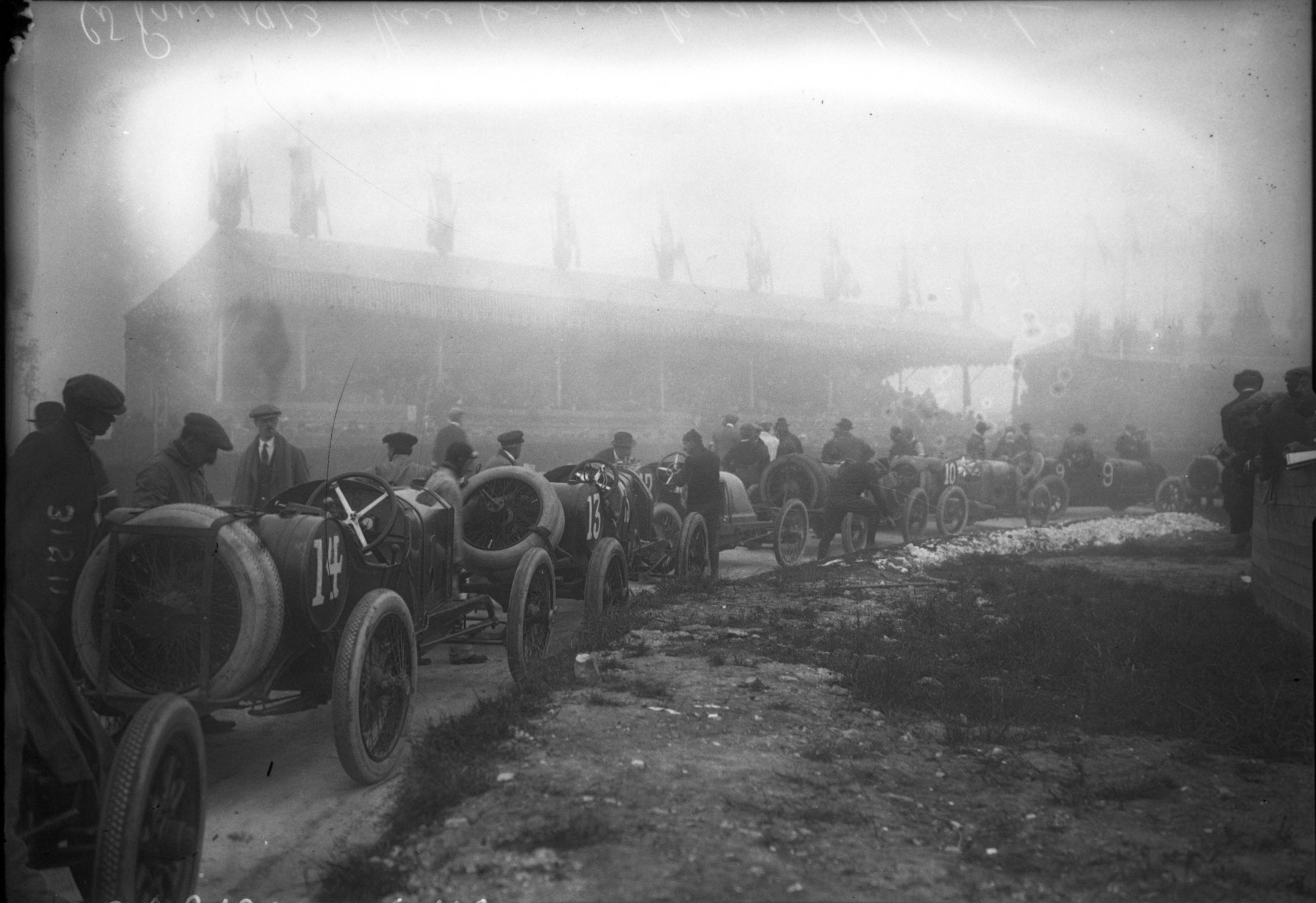
Racing cars at the 1913 French Grand Prix at Amiens

The restriction on Grand Prix cars for 1913 included an 800 kg (1,764 lb) minimum weight and an 1,100 kg (2,425 lb) maximum weight, as well as a 14 mpg_{‑imp} (20 L/100 km; 12 mpg_{‑US}) fuel consumption limit. The buildup to the race and the race itself were marred by three fatal crashes. Bigio was killed testing his Itala before the race. In a separate incident before the race, Paul Zuccarelli was killed when his Peugeot crashed into a cart, and a spectator was killed when Kenelm Lee Guinness's Sunbeam crashed into a river. This made Amiens's fatality tally rise to 5 in the span of less than two months- 2 other people had been killed while testing on the roads being used for the circuit in May. After this race, this circuit- which included an 8-mile (13 km) long straight (which is now known as the D934)- was never used again for motor racing.

Georges Boillot won for the second year in succession, at an average speed of 72.141 mph (116.096 km/h). The fastest lap was set by Paul Bablot, at an average speed of 76.718 mph (123.462 km/h).

== Classification ==
Pos	No	Driver	Car	Laps	Time/Retired
1	8	(France) Georges Boillot	Peugeot EX3	29	7:53:56.8
2	14	(France) Jules Goux	Peugeot EX3		+2:25.6
3	15	(France) Jean Chassagne	Sunbeam		+12:23.4
4	2	(France) Paul Bablot	Delage Y		+22:16.8
5	10	(France) Albert Guyot	Delage Y		+24:02.0
6	9	(United Kingdom) Dario Resta	Sunbeam		+27:41.6
7	16	(France) René Champoiseau	Th. Schneider		+50:40.4
8	5	(Belgium) Josef Christiaens	Excelsior		+1:03:26.8
9	20	(France) René Thomas	Th. Schneider		+1:10:15.4
10	6	(France) René Croquet	Th. Schneider		+1:18:55.8
11	11	(United Kingdom) Sigurd Hornsted	Excelsior		+1:43:43.8
Ret	19	(United Kingdom) Kenelm Lee Guinness	Sunbeam	15	Crash
Ret	17	(Italy) Antonio Moriondo	Itala	13	Spring
Ret	7	(Italy) Felice Nazzaro	Itala	12	Spring
Ret	4	(France) Dragutin Esser	Mathis	8	Valve
Ret	1	(France) Gustave Caillois	Sunbeam	4	Radius rod
Ret	12	(France) Fernand Gabriel	Th. Schneider	3	Carburettor
Ret	3	(Germany) Carl Jörns	Opel	1	Engine
Ret	18	(France) Delpierre	Peugeot EX3	1	Crash
Ret	13	(United Kingdom) H. Pope	Itala	1	Engine

Grand Prix Race
Previous race: None	1913 Grand Prix season Grandes Épreuves	Next race: None
Previous race: 1912 French Grand Prix	French Grand Prix	Next race: 1914 French Grand Prix
