= Coupe des Voiturettes =

Motor race held from 1906 to 1923

- First race: 1906
- Last race: 1923
- Previous names: Coupe de l'Auto
- Most wins (driver): Louis Naudin (2)
- Most wins (manufacturer): Sizaire-Naudin (3); Talbot (3)

The Coupe des Voiturettes (until 1912 also known as the Coupe de l'Auto) was a series of motor races for voiturette racing cars, held from 1906 to 1923.

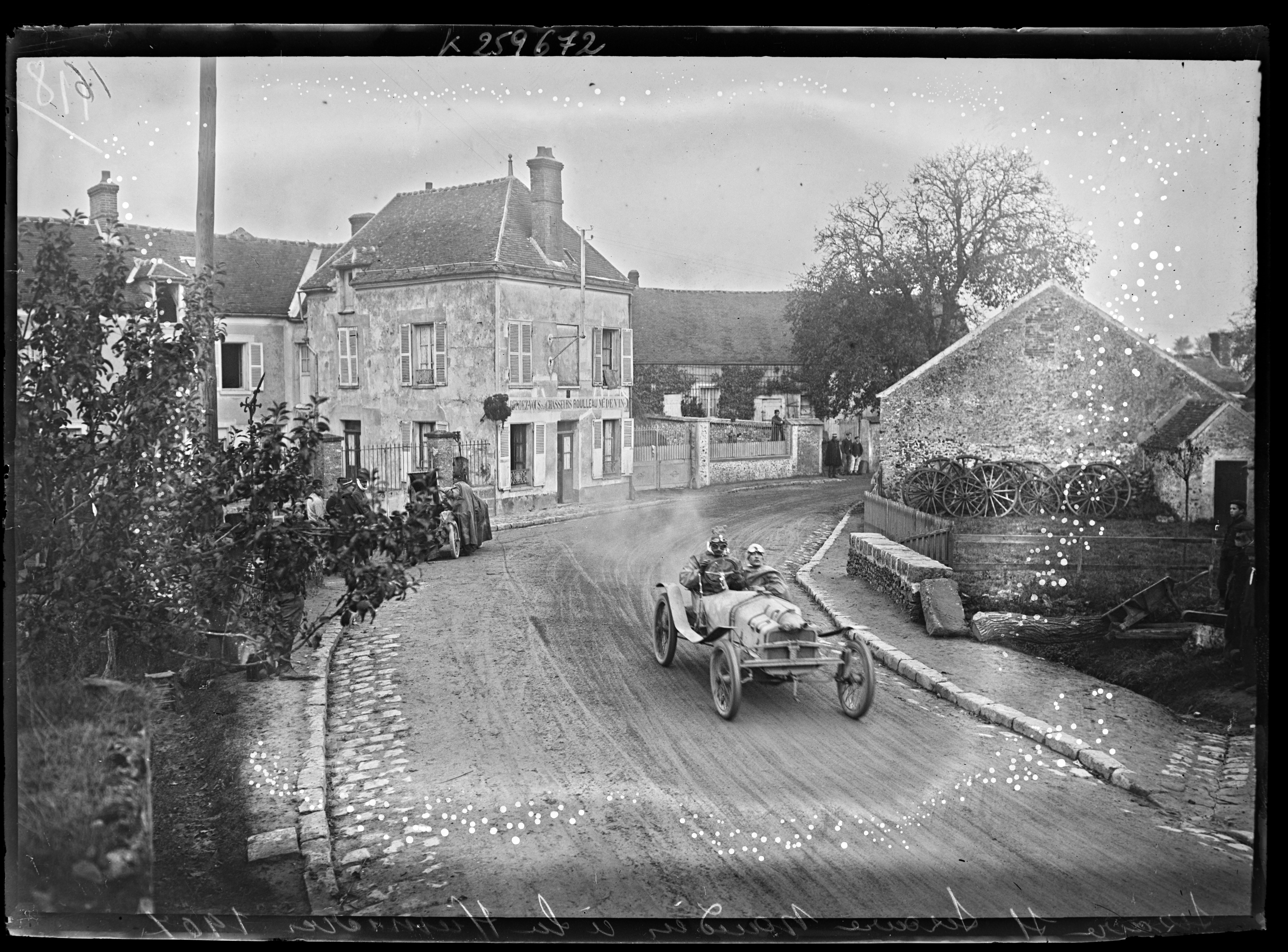
Georges Sizaire on a Sizaire-Naudin in the 1907 race

== History ==
=== Coupe de l'Auto era ===
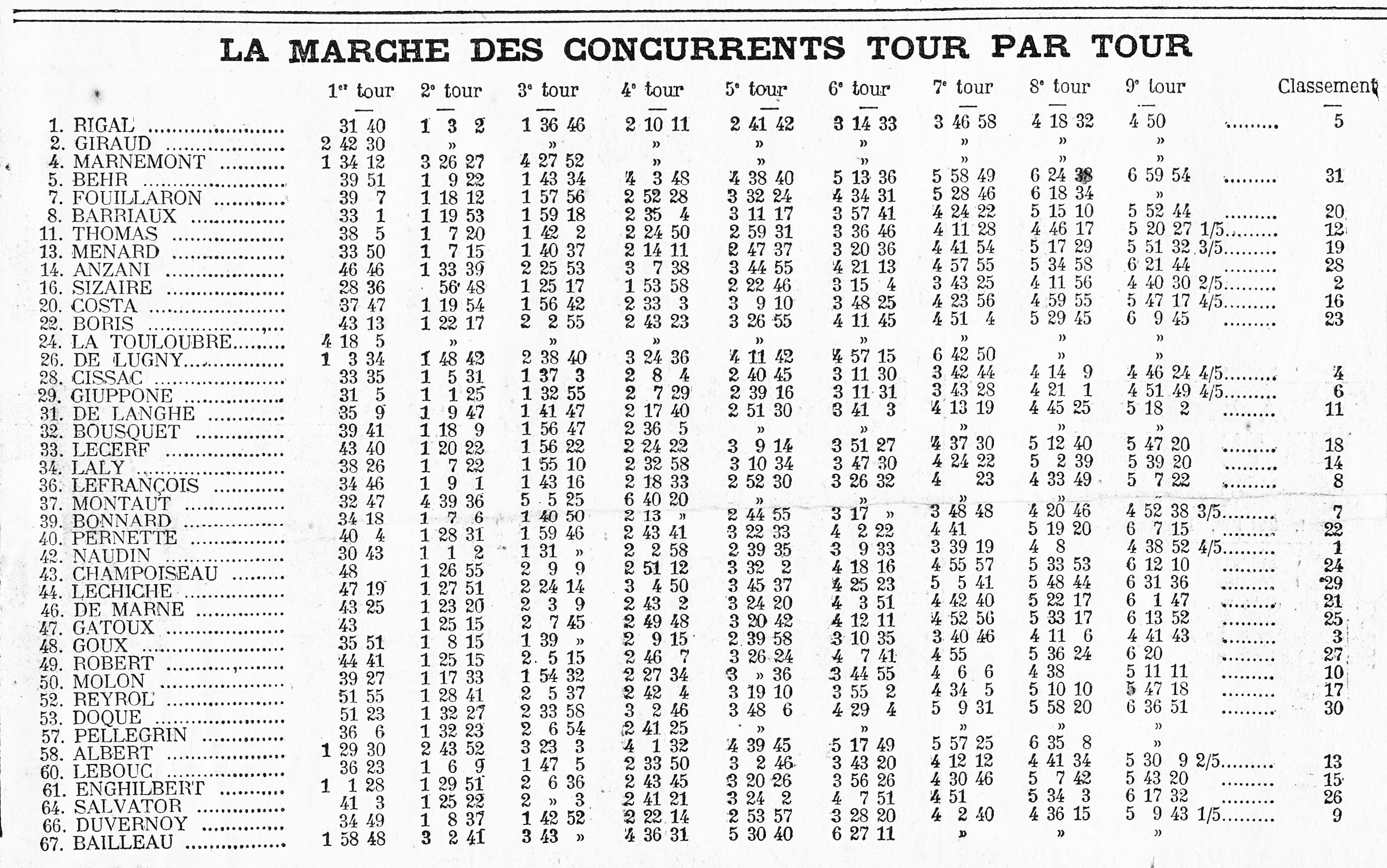
1907 Coupe des Voiturettes lap times, L'Auto-vélo, 28 October 1907

Classes for smaller cars had been included in motor races almost from the start, the first "small" car prize being awarded at the 1898 Marseilles–Nice race to Georges Richard on a car of his own manufacture. The first specifically voiturette race (defined by a weight limit of 300kg) was the Critérium des Voiturettes, held at the Parc des Princes in 1899, and won by "Wilfrid" on a three-wheeler Bollée.

After the collapse of the city-to-city races and the Gordon Bennett Cup, and in response to the Automobile Club de France developing a formula for what would become the 1906 French Grand Prix, the magazine L'Auto sponsored a trophy for touring cars, which included voiturettes; by the time the race was held, it had become a six-day reliability trial around Paris, with larger capacity classes cancelled through lack of interest, and, after vandals scattered nails on the road at Poissy, no results were declared.

In 1906 a more free formula, based on a mix between bore limit and cylinder capacity, and a sliding scale for minimum weight, proved a success. The first two editions of the race were held at a circuit mostly running through a forest near Rambouillet, of 33.82 kilometres in length, and both required entrants to qualify for the race itself by completing the circuit eight times per day for six days; the first race consisted of 7 laps, the second of 9. In 1908 the formula, which had originally been restricted to cars with engines of 1 or 2 cylinders, had been expanded to 4.

The first three races had been won by one-cylinder Sizaire-Naudin cars, once driven by Georges Sizaire and twice by Louis Naudin. Naudin missed out on a chance in 1906 by crashing on the fourth day of qualifying, but in 1907 and 1908 beat Sizaire into second place, and, indeed, in 1908, Sizaire-Naudin came within three seconds of a 1-2-3, Jules Goux in a Lion-Peugeot just pipping the Courbevoie marque's Lebouc to third. Sizaire-Naudin in 1908 at least took the cup for the best team for the first time, which in 1906 and 1907 had gone to the Lion-Peugeot stable.

The formula had in fact been so successful - 64 cars had entered in 1907 - that the A.C.F. decided to hold its own race, the Grand Prix des Voiturettes, the day before the 1908 French Grand Prix, over 7 laps of the same circuit. The winner was Albert Guyot, six minutes ahead of Naudin, with Grand Prix winners Georges Boillot and Goux third and fourth in their Lion-Peugeots.

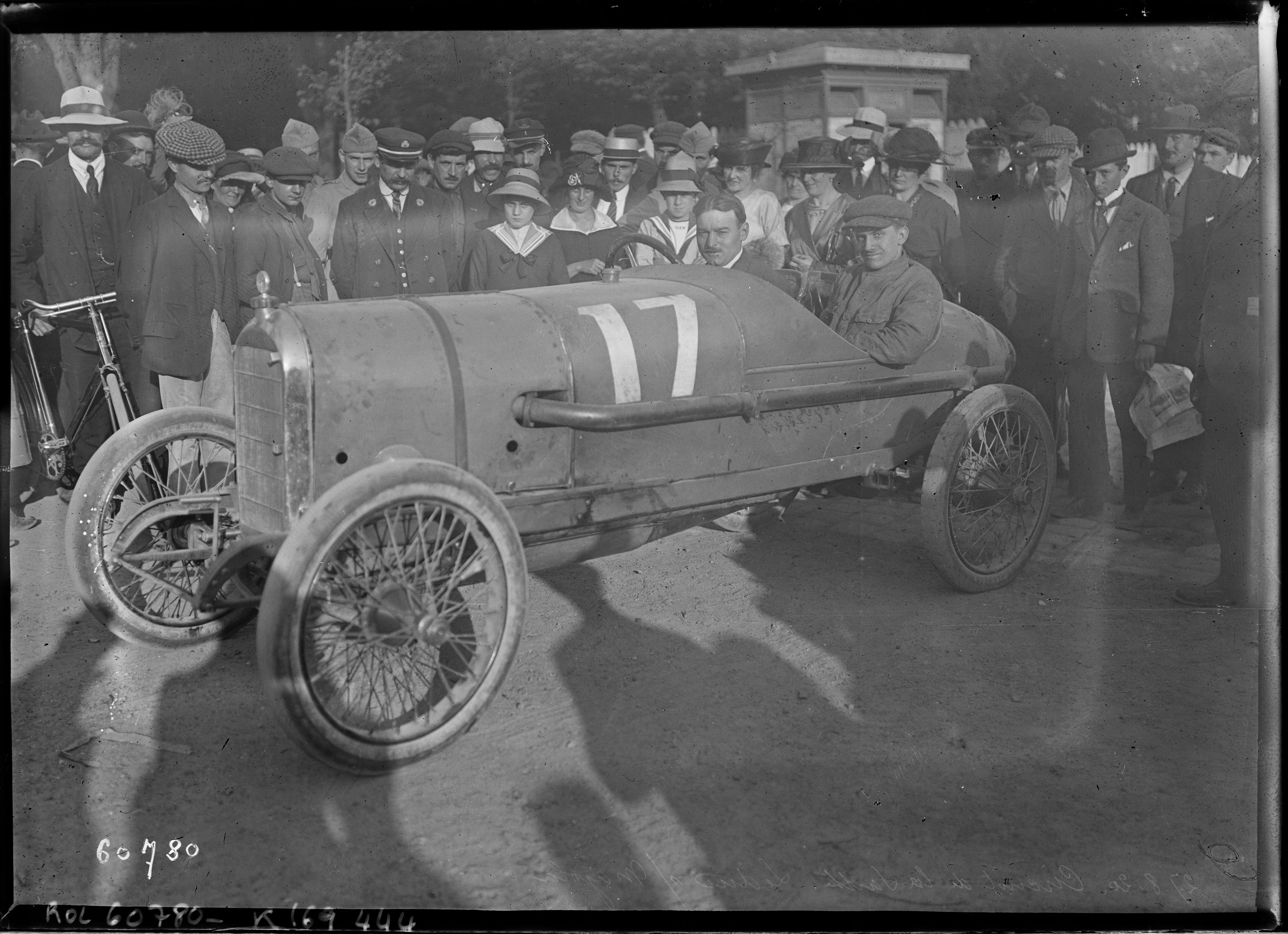
Paul Leduc with his Majola, a retirement in the 1920 race

=== Change to Coupe des Voiturettes ===
The A.C.F. stepped back from organizing racing at the end of 1908, and the Coupe des Voiturettes (no longer with the Coupe de l'Auto imprimatur), with the A.C.F.'s voiturette formula adopted, became the biggest motor racing event in France. One tragedy occurred in practice for the 1910 event, when Giosuè Giuppone, the defending champion, was killed in practice trying to avoid an errant cyclist.

The 1912 French Grand Prix at Dieppe included a 3 litre "voiturette" class, so there was no need for a separate voiturette race; the first voiturette to finish was Victor Rigal's Sunbeam, in third place overall - voiturette Sunbeams finished 3rd to 5th in the Grand Prix. The 1913 race was also marked by tragedy, when a local postman, Eugène Maillard, was fatally injured at Capelle during the second lap of the race; reports variously suggested he was crossing the track and was struck by Simon Drouillet's Buick, or that the Buick lost a wheel, which struck the spectating Maillard. A court later acquitted Drouillet of any blame.

=== Post-World War 1 ===
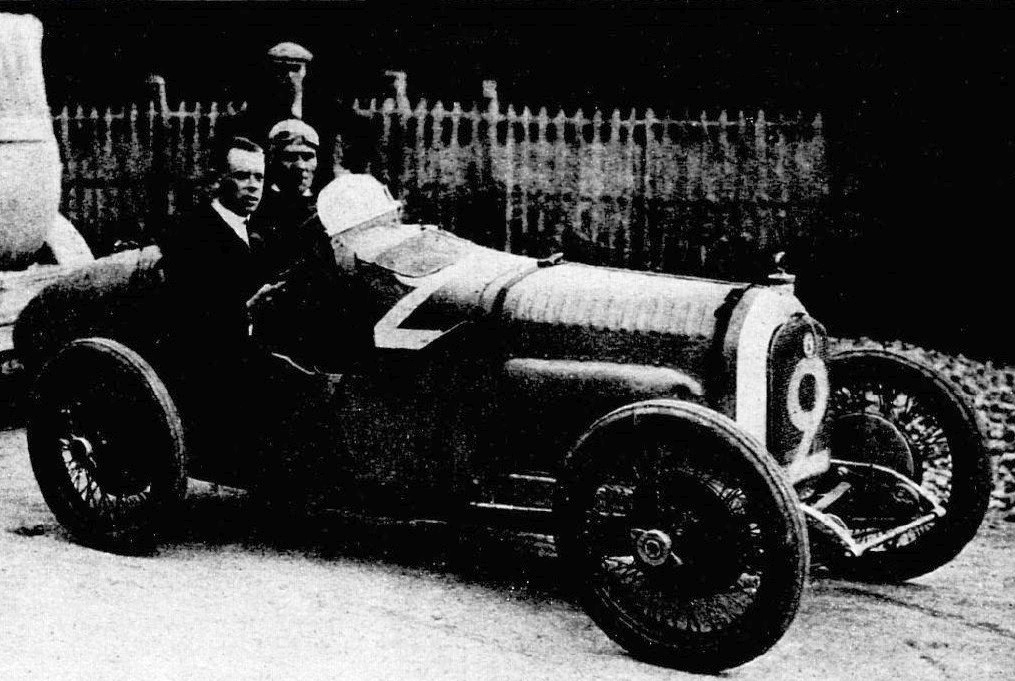
Kenelm Lee Guinness winning in 1922

After the First World War, the Coupe des Voiturettes was revived for the smaller cars, and in effect replaced the Coupe de l'Auto. Friderich also headed up a Bugatti 1-2-3-4 at the Gran Premio delle Vetturette at Brescia the following year, the Type 13 model henceforth being known as the Brescia Bugatti; however the Voiturette Grand Prix that year went to Indianapolis 500 winner René Thomas, driving a Talbot-Darracq, basically a 1.5 litre version of the Grand Prix Sunbeam and, like the larger car, designed by Louis Coatalen. Thomas' riding mechanic was future Grand Prix winner Albert Divo and the Talbot-Darracqs filled the top three places, Kenelm Lee Guinness finishing second and Henry Segrave, who would win the 1923 French Grand Prix, finishing third.

Lee Guinness won in 1922, the middle of three consecutive races he won in for Talbot-Darracq, between the Brooklands 200 Mile Race and the Gran Premio de Penya Rhin, although the race had only five starters - three Talbot-Darracqs filling the first three places, Bunny Marshall (4th) in a Crouch-Anzani, and Joseph Collomb in a Corre La Licorne in fifth.

For 1923, Talbot introduced the Type 70, and Fiat produced the Type 803; however the marques avoided a direct challenge, which meant that Alessandro Cagno took an easy win in the Gran Premio delle Vetturette at Brescia, and the Coupe was reduced to four starters - three Talbots and Collomb, who had entered the Coupe since 1907, in his Corre. The race distance was duly reduced to avoid boring the spectators. Albert Divo won in part because his was the only car to avoid problems. Indeed, despite the prestige of the Coupe, other voiturette races were much more competitive, with 25 cars starting the J.C.C. 200 mile race at Brooklands (won in an upset by Maurice Harvey's Alvis), 22 the voiturette Grand Prix de Boulogne (won by Henry Segrave in a Talbot), 11 the Gran Premio de Penya Rhin (won by Divo), and 10 the Spanish Voiturette Grand Prix (won by Dario Resta in a Talbot).

With a new 1.5 litre Grand Prix formula due to start in 1925, voiturettes were, in effect, going to become Grand Prix cars, and most races were held as a mix of classes rather than as standalone events, the J.C.C. 200 being the main exception. The Coupe however did not survive into the season.

== Winners ==
Year	Winner	Car	Circuit	Distance	Starters	Finishers	Notes
1906	(France) Georges Sizaire	(France) Sizaire-Naudin	Rambouillet	7 laps (145.72 miles)	11	10	4 cars failed to make it through qualification
1907	(France) Louis Naudin	(France) Sizaire-Naudin	Rambouillet	9 laps (189.13 miles)	41	33	26 cars failed to make it through qualification
1908	(France) Louis Naudin	(France) Sizaire-Naudin	Compiègne	8 laps (248.55 miles)	31	17	Grand Prix des Voiturettes (at Dieppe) won by Albert Guyot in a Delage
1909	(Italy) Giosuè Giuppone	(France) Lion-Peugeot	Boulogne-sur-Mer	12 laps (282.41 miles)	21	10	
1910	(Italy) Paul Zuccarelli	(Spain) Hispano-Suiza	Boulogne-sur-Mer	12 laps (282.41 miles)	14	6	
1911	(France) Paul Bablot	(France) Delage	Boulogne-sur-Mer	12 laps (387.62 miles)	30	13	
1912	(France) Victor Rigal	(United Kingdom) Sunbeam	Dieppe	20 laps (954.96 miles)	32	9	Concurrent with the 1912 French Grand Prix; officially only Coupe de l'Auto, not Coupe des Voiturettes
1913	(France) Georges Boillot	(France) Lion-Peugeot	Boulogne-sur-Mer	12 laps (387.62 miles)	17	7	3 litre formula
1920	(France) Ernest Friderich	(France) Bugatti T13	Le Mans	24 laps (255.01 miles)	20	8	1.5 litre formula
1921	(France) René Thomas	(France) Talbot-Darracq 56	Le Mans	26 laps (276.26 miles)	17	6	
1922	(United Kingdom) Kenelm Lee Guinness	(France) Talbot-Darracq 56	Le Mans	35 laps (375.41 miles)	5	5	
1923	(France) Albert Divo	(France) Talbot 70	Le Mans	24 laps (257.43 miles)	4	2	
