= Giosuè Giuppone =

Italian cyclist and race car driver

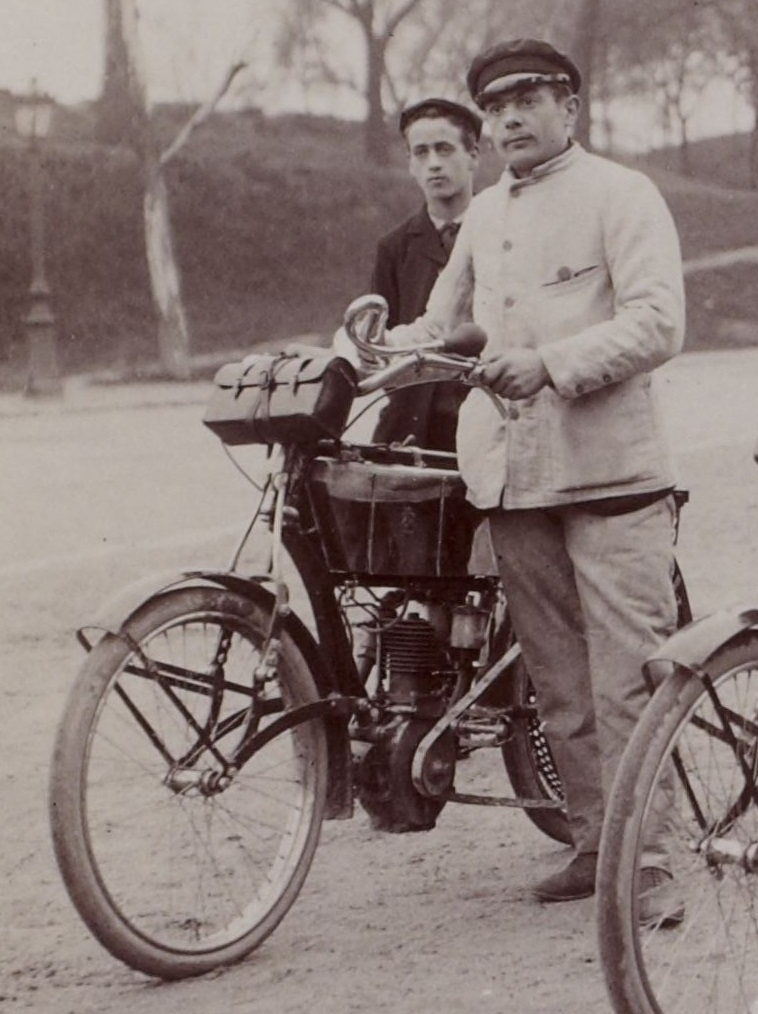
Giosue Giuppone on a Peugeot Motorcycle

Giosuè Giuppone (Calco, 29 September 1878 – Wirwignes, 16 September 1910) was an Italian track cyclist, motorcycle racer and race car driver in the early 1900s. He was racing Peugeot motorcycle and automobiles until his death in 1910.

== Biography ==
Giuppone's sporting career began in bicycling, and he won two Italian national championships in middle-distance racing. He moved to motorcycle racing in the early 1900s, most notably for the Peugeot racing team. He was the second Italian rider to compete in the Isle of Man Tourist Trophy. His races for Peugeot included extensive track racing on the large-capacity, ultra-lightweight racers of the early 1900s, which typically weighed a maximum of 110lbs, but had unlimited engine capacity, as much as 2liters at times. He also raced Peugeot automobiles as part of the factory team, winning the Coupe des Voiturettes in 1909, the Torino Cup and the Copa Catalunya and Circuito delle Madonie in 1908. He also set a number of early motorcycle speed records.

The accident that cost Giuppone his life occurred during testing of the Coupe des Voiturettes at Boulogne-sur-Mer, 1910: a cyclist crossed the street while Giuppone's car was racing at high speed. In an effort to avoid the cyclist, Giuppone made a sharp turn, which caused a spin and the rollover of his Peugeot. Left crushed by his car, Giuppone died instantly, while his mechanic (Paul Péan) was slightly wounded. A monument to Guippone was built at the site of the accident.

Giosuè Giuppone was a cousin of cyclists Stefano and Serafino Giuppone.
