= Paul Péan =

French motorcycle racer

Paul Henri Péan
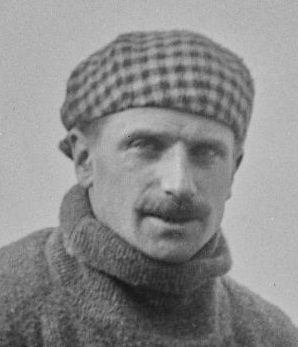
- Paul Péan in 1920
- Nationality: French
- Born: 10 September 1888; Nesle-la-Reposte, Marne
- Died: 14 September 1936 (aged 48)

Paul Henri Péan (10 September 1888 - 14 September 1936) was a French Motorcycle racer, active between the years 1909 and 1932 becoming one of the most successful motorcycle racers in the years immediately following the First World War, racing for Peugeot primarily in the 500cc category.

== Biography ==
Péan's first racing experience came at 15 years old as a riding mechanic for Giosue Giuppone, following Giuppone's death he started racing by himself and achieved his first success in 1912.

Péan's racing career was interrupted by the First World War during which he distinguished himself as a pilot and received the Croix de guerre and the medaille militaire and was proposed for the Legion d'honneur.

Péan resumed his racing career following the war with a number of victories, including at l'Eure, Circuit de Champagne, Grand Prix de Montlhery, Spanish Grand Prix and Monza. He also held a number of motorcycle speed recorods.

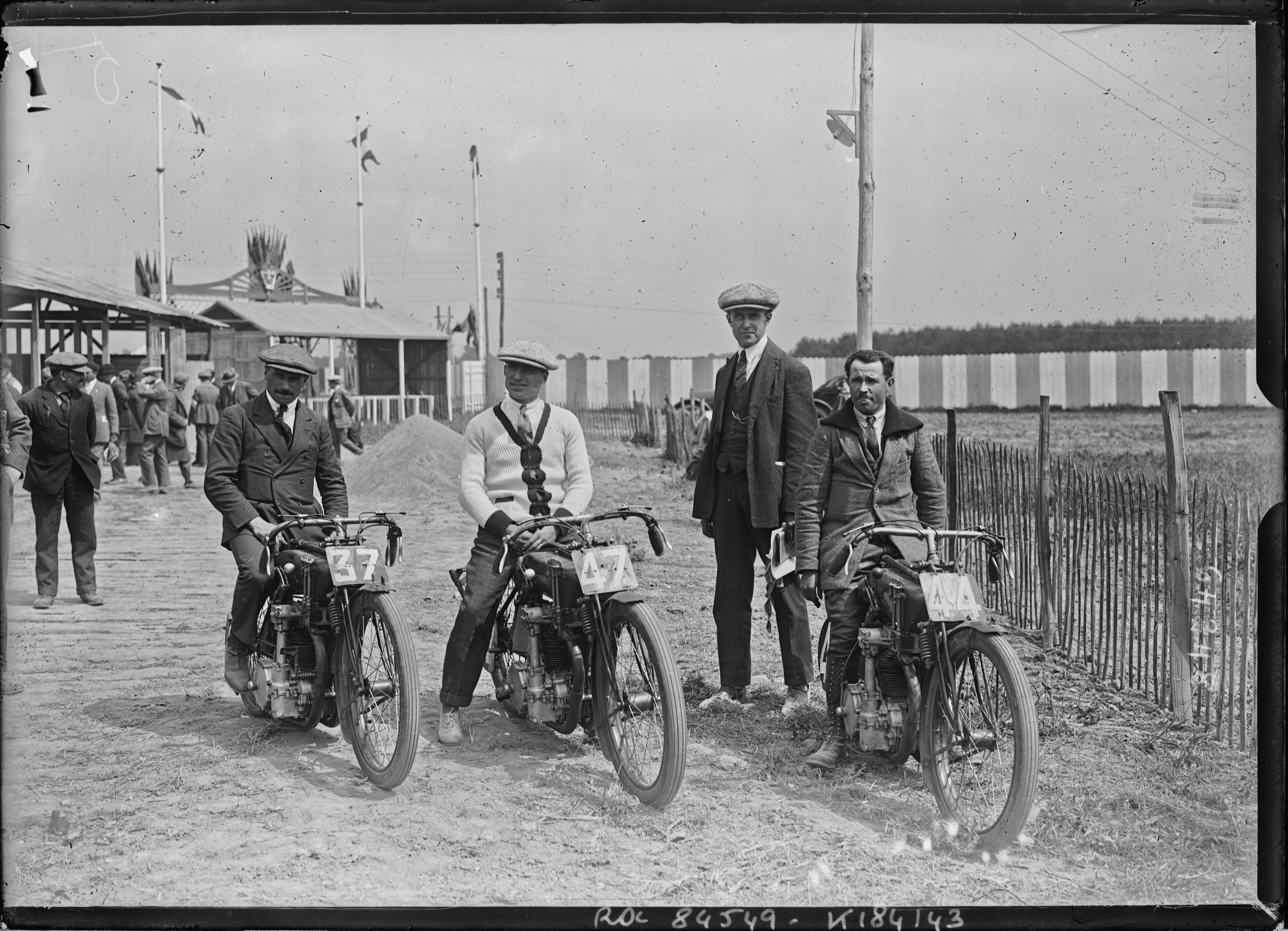
Paul Péan (number 37) with Peugeot team mates Richard (number 47) and René Gillard (number 44)

After retiring from racing, Péan became president of the Motocycle-Club de France and while attending an event organised by the club at Autodrome de Linas-Montlhéry while trying a motorcycle he crashed at a speed of more than 120 kilometers per hour (75 miles per hour) after colliding with another rider, he died during the night from the multiple injuries he suffered in the crash.

== Major Victories ==
1923 Swiss motorcycle Grand Prix (500cc)
