= Sizaire-Naudin =

Sizaire et Naudin
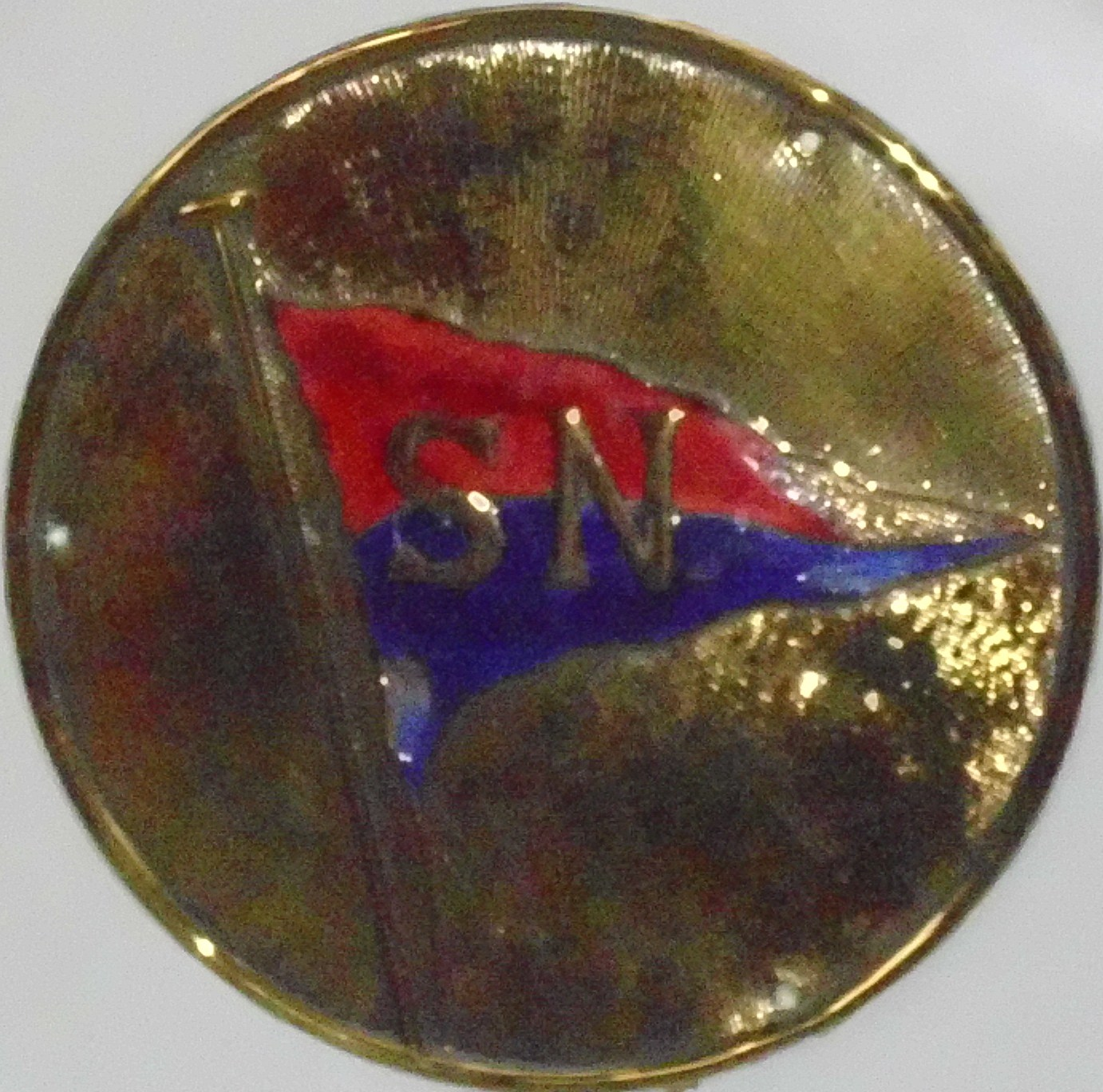

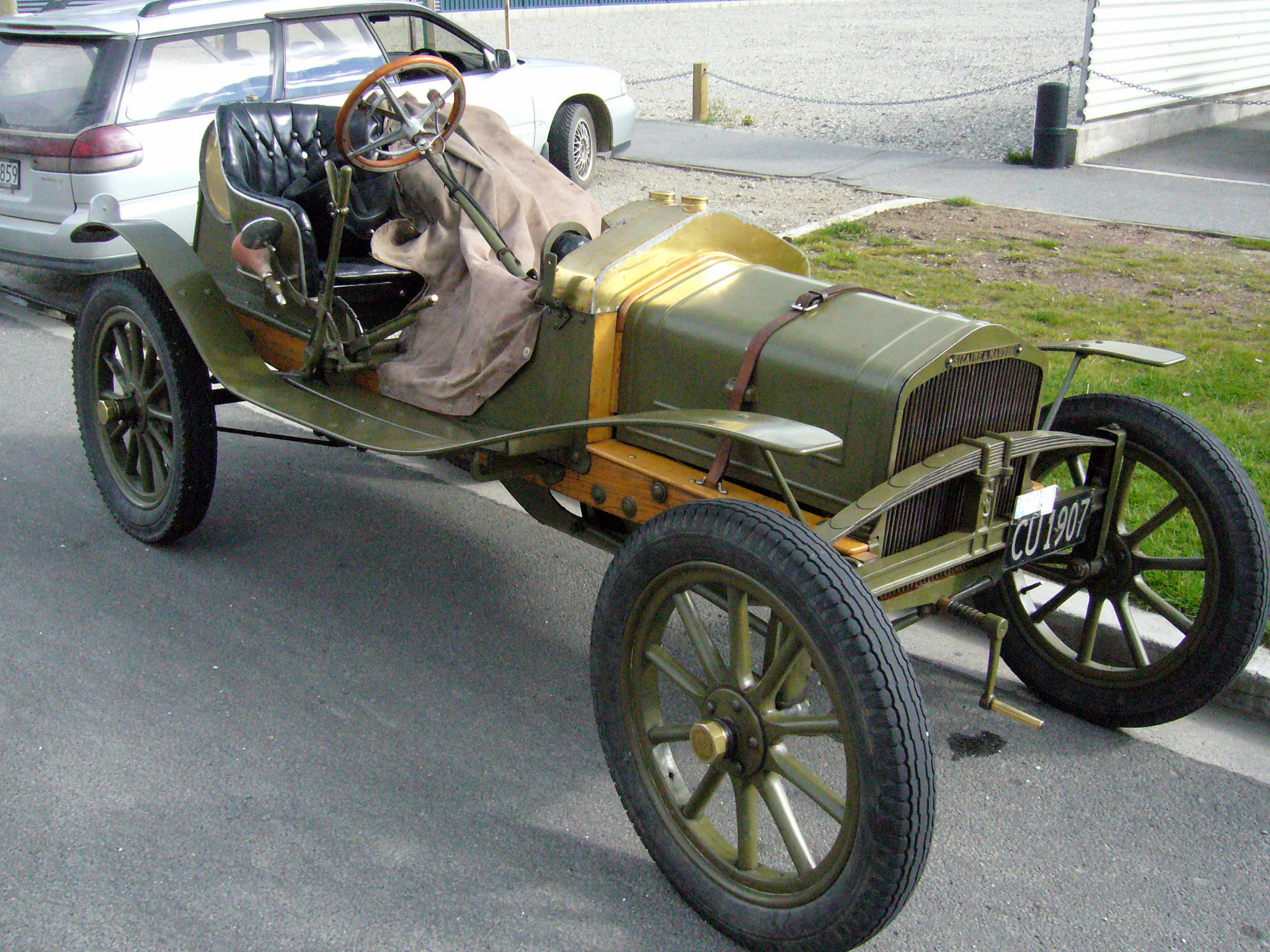
- Single-cylinder 1907 Sizaire & Naudin
- Industry: Automotive
- Founded: 1903
- Founder: Maurice Sizaire (1877–1970); Georges Sizaire (1880–1924); Louis Naudin (1876–1913)
- Defunct: 1921
- Successor: Sizaire-Berwick (1913–1927); Sizaire Frères (1923–1931)
- Headquarters: 52 rue Victor-Hugo, Courbevoie, France

Sizaire et Naudin was a French automobile manufacturer located on the northern side of central Paris, at 52 rue Victor-Hugo in Courbevoie, between 1903 and 1921.

== The company ==
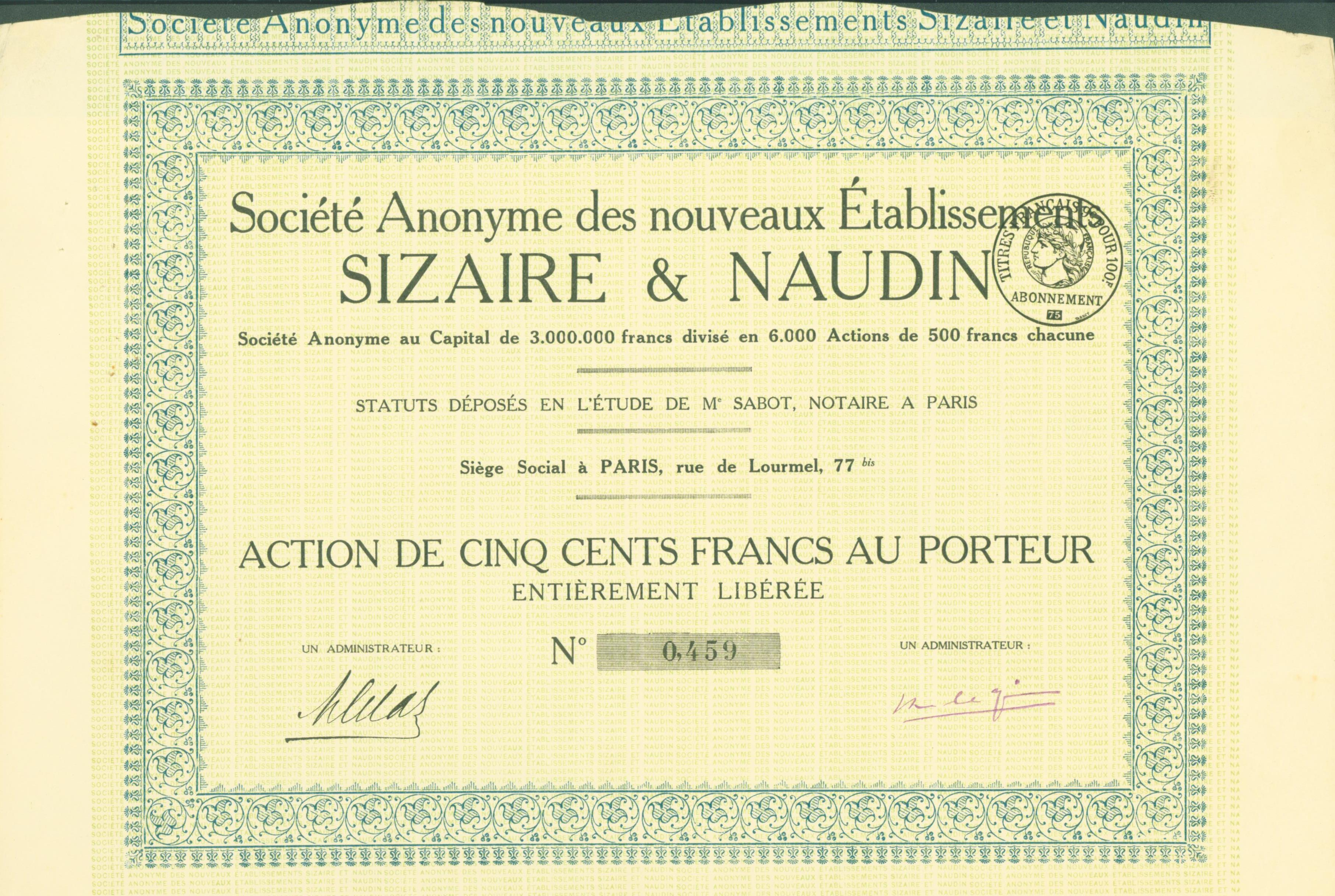
Share of the S. A. des nouveaux Établissements Sizaire & Naudin, issued 1912

Sizaire-Naudin was founded by two brothers called Maurice (1877–1969) and Georges Sizaire (1880–1924), in partnership with a family friend, Louis Naudin (1876–1913) in 1903. The partners had already experimented with a car in 1902 or 1903 but it was not until 1905 that the light "voiturette-style" cars were offered for sale, and shown at the Paris Salon in October of that year.

In 1912 the Sizaire brothers left the company following disagreement with an investor. Their participation in the automotive business was far from ended, however, and in 1913, with the help of F. Berwick, the London-based UK importer of Corre La Licorne cars, they obtained finance in London for the launch of a new automobile manufacturing company called Sizaire-Berwick. Sizaire-Naudin continued for a further decade without them.

== The cars ==
The first cars were basic single cylinder vehicles with independent front suspension by sliding pillars and a transverse leaf spring, identical to earlier Decauvilles. A unique gearbox used an integral 3-speed differential – 3 straight cut pinions brought to bear in turn on a single large straight-cut crown wheel.

Orders were good and the company received backing to move to larger premises from bicycle importers Hammond et Monnier who soon afterwards sold the firm to the Duc d'Uzes and from 1907 the family crest appeared on the radiator surround.

By 1911, the single-cylinder format was regarded as outmoded. After the departure of the Sizaire brothers the technicians at the business switched to a four-cylinder engine, initially using a bought-in 1847 cm^{3} Ballot unit, but did not result in significantly increased sales.

After the war, production restarted with a new company, Société des Nouveaux Établissements Sizaire et Naudin, making Ballot-engined cars based on prewar designs. The manufacturer took a stand at the Motor Show in October 1919 to exhibit a four-seater torpedo" bodied Type D car with a 2,820 mm (111.0 in) wheelbase, and powered by a four-cylinder 2292 cm^{3} engine. This was listed by the manufacturer at 24,000 francs.

In spite of an attempt to re-enter racing at the International Voiturette Cup of 1921, the directors called in the liquidators later that year.

== Racing ==
Sizaire et Naudin enjoyed great success in early voiturette races with rules which limited cylinder bore but did not specify stroke length. This success lasted from 1906 to 1909, with some presence in racing until 1911.
