= Louis Naudin =

French car manufacturer and racing driver (1880–1912)

- At the 1912 French Grand Prix
- Born: Louis Edouard Naudin; 28 April 1880 Issoudun, France
- Died: 19 December 1915 (aged 35) Puteaux, France

Louis Edouard Naudin (28 April 1880 – 19 December 1915) was a French car manufacturer and racing driver, who twice won the Coupe des Voiturettes, and who took part in the 1912 French Grand Prix.

== Career ==
Naudin was a turner at the De Dion-Bouton factory in Paris, and became friends with fellow employee Georges Sizaire, whose brother Maurice planned to build a car; on 1 June 1903 the trio set up their own company, Sizaire-Naudin, with its base at Rue Godefroy, in Puteaux. The new firm was so overwhelmed orders for its second model - a voiturette with independent front suspension - which it first displayed at the Paris Salon in 1905 that it had to obtain backing from the Duc d'Uzes to meet demand, and it moved to a factory in the Rue de Lourmel, in the 15th arrondissement of Paris, at the end of 1905.

=== Coupe des Voiturettes ===
The Sizaire-Naudin marque enjoyed a number of successes in smaller events around Paris, and it made its major competitive debut at the 1906 Coupe des Voiturettes at Rambouillet, which required participants to complete 6 laps of the circuit - around 225km - every day for six days, at an average speed of 30 kph, in order to take part in the race itself. On the fourth day, Naudin crashed at La Fourche corner, and so was hors de combat for the race; Georges Sizaire at least won for the marque. Naudin made up for this by winning the first Coppa delle Voiturette in Sicily, run over 2 laps of the Targa Florio course, funded by Vincenzo Florio himself, who bought a Sizaire-Naudin at the Paris Motor Show and induced Naudin to drive it; Georges Sizaire brought a car to accompany him but retired early. Florio came second in a de Dion.

Naudin took the Coupe des Voiturettes in 1907, running second behind Sizaire for the first 5 laps (out of 8), and, after Sizaire dropped back with a puncture, Naudin took over a secure lead, which Naudin retained to the end, Sizaire coming back to second. The Sizaire-Naudins were lucky to make the start, as they needed a piston change during the regularity tests before the race start, and rival competitors protected - unsuccessfully - that the Sizaire-Naudins had been "doped" with picric acid.

The following year, Naudin missed out in the first (and only) Grand Prix des Voiturettes, a curtain-raiser for the 1908 French Grand Prix, to Albert Guyot in a Delage, thanks to Delage's clever tactics - Guyot kept to a regular schedule rather than thrash his car, and relied on better economy to avoid having to make a fuel stop, and, although Naudin led early on, he was not able to make up the time lost. Sizaire-Naudin's revenge came at the Coupe, with the one-cylinder engine now bored out to a 10 inch stroke and a correspondingly tall and narrow bodywork, and Naudin led a Sizaire-Naudin 1-2-4, team-mate Ledouc missing out on third by a couple of seconds.

=== Grand Prix ===
A change in regulations for voiturette racing at the end of 1908 worked against the Sizaire-Naudins, whose single-cylinder engines were no longer the best option, and they withdrew from racing. A brief return in 1912 with a four-cylinder engine, at the Duc d'Uzes' insistence, for the Grand Prix (which included a voiturette class) was not profitable, although Naudin rose from 41st (and last but one) to 19th at one-third distance but was then forced to retire due to engine problems.

It was Naudin's final race. An illness saw him leave the firm which bore his name, and he declined to the extent that he was unable to serve in the First World War; he died just before Christmas 1915.

== Race results ==
1906:

- Coupe des Voiturettes: did not qualify
- Dourdan hillclimb: 1st
- Gaillon hillclimb: 1st

1907:

- Coppa delle Vetturette: 1st
- Coupe des Voiturettes: 1st

1908:

- Corsa Vetturette Torino: retired
- Corsa Vetturette Madonie: retired
- Grand Prix des Voiturettes: 2nd
- Coupe des Voiturettes: 1st

1912:

- Coupe des Voiturettes: did not arrive
- French Grand Prix: retired

== Gallery ==
During the regularity trials before the 1906 Coupe des Voiturettes.

At La Fourche, en route to winning the 1907 Coupe des Voiturettes.

At the 1908 Grand Prix des Voiturettes.

At the 1908 Coupe des Voiturettes.
