= Georges Sizaire =

French car manufacturer and racing driver (1880–1934)

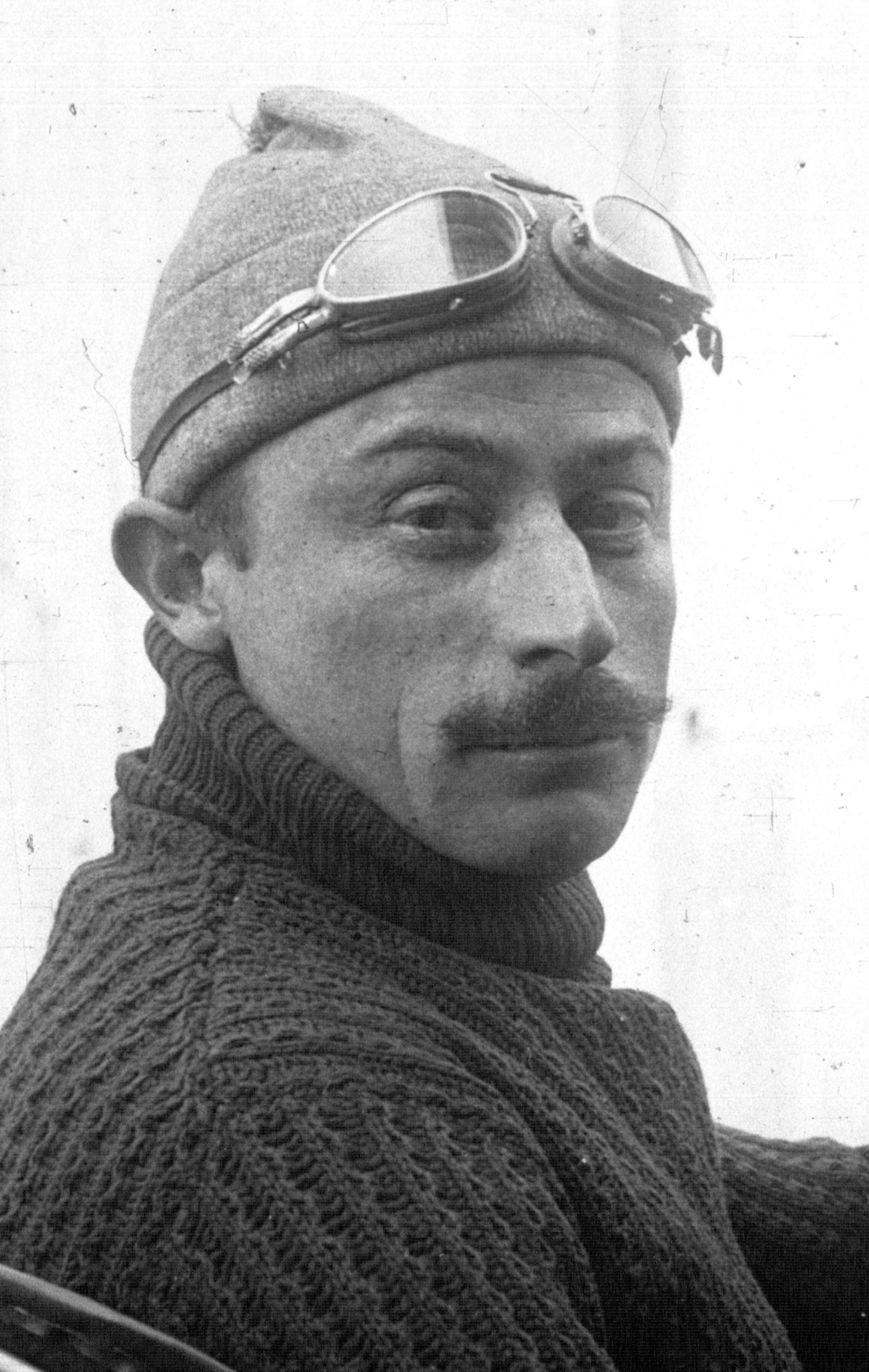
- At the 1912 French Grand Prix
- Born: Georges Sizaire; 31 May 1880 Paris, France
- Died: 14 May 1934 (aged 53) Courbevoie, France

Georges Sizaire (31 May 1880 – 5 May 1934) was a French car manufacturer and racing driver, who won the first Coupe des Voiturettes and took part in the 1912 French Grand Prix.

== Sizaire-Naudin ==
In the late 19th century, Sizaire's older brother Maurice decided to build a car, and, in order to help, Georges Sizaire took up a role as a turner at the De Dion-Bouton motor works, alongside family friend Louis Naudin. The apprenticeship was briefly delayed by Georges' military service and on 1 June 1903 the trio set up their own company, Sizaire-Naudin, with its base at Rue Godefroy, in Puteaux. The new firm was so overwhelmed orders for its second model - a voiturette with independent front suspension - which it first displayed at the Paris Salon in 1905 that it had to obtain backing from the Duc d'Uzes to meet demand, and it moved to a factory in the Rue de Lourmel, in the 15th arrondissement of Paris, at the end of 1905.

=== Coupe des Voiturettes ===
The Sizaire-Naudin marque enjoyed a number of successes in smaller events around Paris, and it made its major competitive debut at the 1906 Coupe des Voiturettes at Rambouillet, which required participants to complete 6 laps of the circuit - around 225km - every day for six days, at an average speed of 30 kph, in order to take part in the race itself. On the fourth day, Naudin crashed at La Fourche corner, and so was hors de combat for the race, but Sizaire took an easy victory. The success generated customer orders in the region of 30 per month. Naudin won the first Coppa delle Voiturette in Sicily, Sizaire retiring early.

Sizaire was runner-up at the Coupe des Voiturettes in 1907, having led the race for the first two-thirds, but a puncture sent him out of the top five; by the finish, he had climbed back up to second, just over 90 seconds down (after nearly 5 hours of racing) on the winner - Louis Naudin. The Sizaire-Naudins were lucky to make the start, as they needed a piston change during the regularity tests before the race start, and rival competitors protected - unsuccessfully - that the Sizaire-Naudins had been "doped" with picric acid. Sizaire at least was ranked as one of the three outstanding drivers of the race (with Victor Rigal and Henri Cissac).

After a disappointing 1908 Grand Prix des Voiturettes (a curtain-raiser for that year's Grand Prix), in which Sizaire retired at five-sixths distance while in 5th position (just behind Naudin), Sizaire-Naudin registered its greatest success, at the Coupe des Voiturettes. The one-cylinder engine was now bored out to a 10 inch stroke and a correspondingly tall and narrow bodywork, and Naudin led a Sizaire-Naudin 1-2-4, with Sizaire second (and setting the fastest lap on the last tour), team-mate Ledouc missing out on third by a couple of seconds.

A change in regulations for voiturette racing at the end of 1908 worked against the Sizaire-Naudins, whose single-cylinder engines were no longer the best option. Sizaire drove a lone example at the second Copa Catalunya at Sitges in 1909, and finished second, albeit out of only 4 finishers, and nearly 90 minutes behind winner Jules Goux in a Lion-Peugeot, but Sizaire had lost significant time with punctures, and in rescuiing Georges Boillot and Giosuè Guippone, who had crashed their Lion-Peugeots.

=== Grand Prix car ===
With the small company running at manufacturing capacity, it stepped back from racing, but the Duc d'Uzes insisted the marque return to racing in 1912, to promote its new 4-cylinder model. As the 1912 French Grand Prix included a voiturette class, Sizaire-Naudin entered three examples. Georges was the best performing of the trio, and was running in 9th place overall, and 4th in the voiturette, with four laps to go, but a lost wheel put him out of the race.

== Sizaire-Berwick ==
After a falling-out with the Duc d'Uzes, not helped by Naudin being affected by an illness which would prove fatal, in 1913 the Sizaire brothers set up their own firm, based at Courbevoie, to manufacture a luxury car designed by Maurice and tested by Georges; the Sizaire-Berwick name was adopted to refer the brothers' British agent, F. W. Berwick. The radiator and logo (an entwined S and B) resembled those of Rolls-Royce so much that the older company sued, and Maurice had to re-design the front of the car. The Duc would use the Sizaire-Naudin name briefly after the First World War to continue the decade-old production car run.

== Sizaire Frères ==
The First World War interrupted the business (Georges Sizaire being appointed as official driver to the French president) and Berwick built a large factory in Park Royal in London to manufacture aircraft and Sizaire-Berwick military vehicles; in 1920 he moved production of the Sizaire-Berwick there. The Sizaire brothers therefore set up a separate company, Sizaire Frères, to make a production car with independent suspension on all four wheels. Georges Sizaire set up a satellite company in Belgium in 1929 with the Belgian importer of Sizaires, Richard Thielen, manufacturing Sizaire 6 models under the name Belga Rise, but the company ceased trading in 1935, the year after Georges died of cancer; Sizaire-Berwick had ceased production in 1925.

== Race results ==
1906:

- Coupe des Voiturettes: 1st
- Coppa delle Voiturette: retired
- Motoclub Normand speed trial: 1st

1907:

- Coupe des Voiturettes: 2nd

1908:

- Corsa Vetturette Madonie: retired
- Grand Prix des Voiturettes: 18th
- Coupe des Voiturettes: 2nd

1909:

- Copa Catalunya: 2nd
- La Turbie hillclimb: 2nd

1912:

- Coupe des Voiturettes: did not arrive
- French Grand Prix: retired

== Gallery ==
At the 1907 Coupe des Voiturettes

At the 1908 Grand Prix des Voiturettes

At the 1912 French Grand Prix

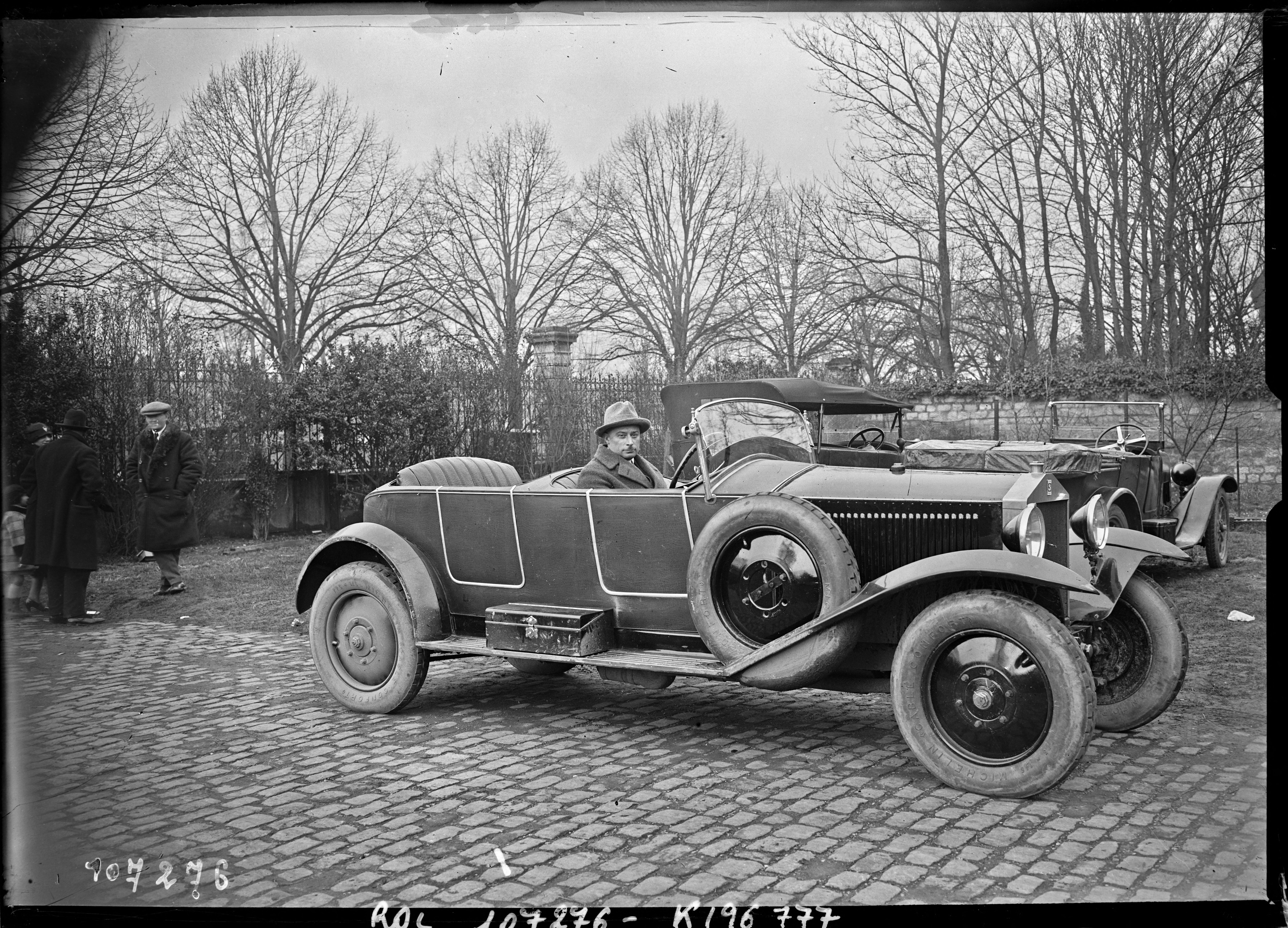
With a Sizaire at a 1926 concours event in Paris
