= William Watson (motoring pioneer) =

British racing driver (1873–1961)

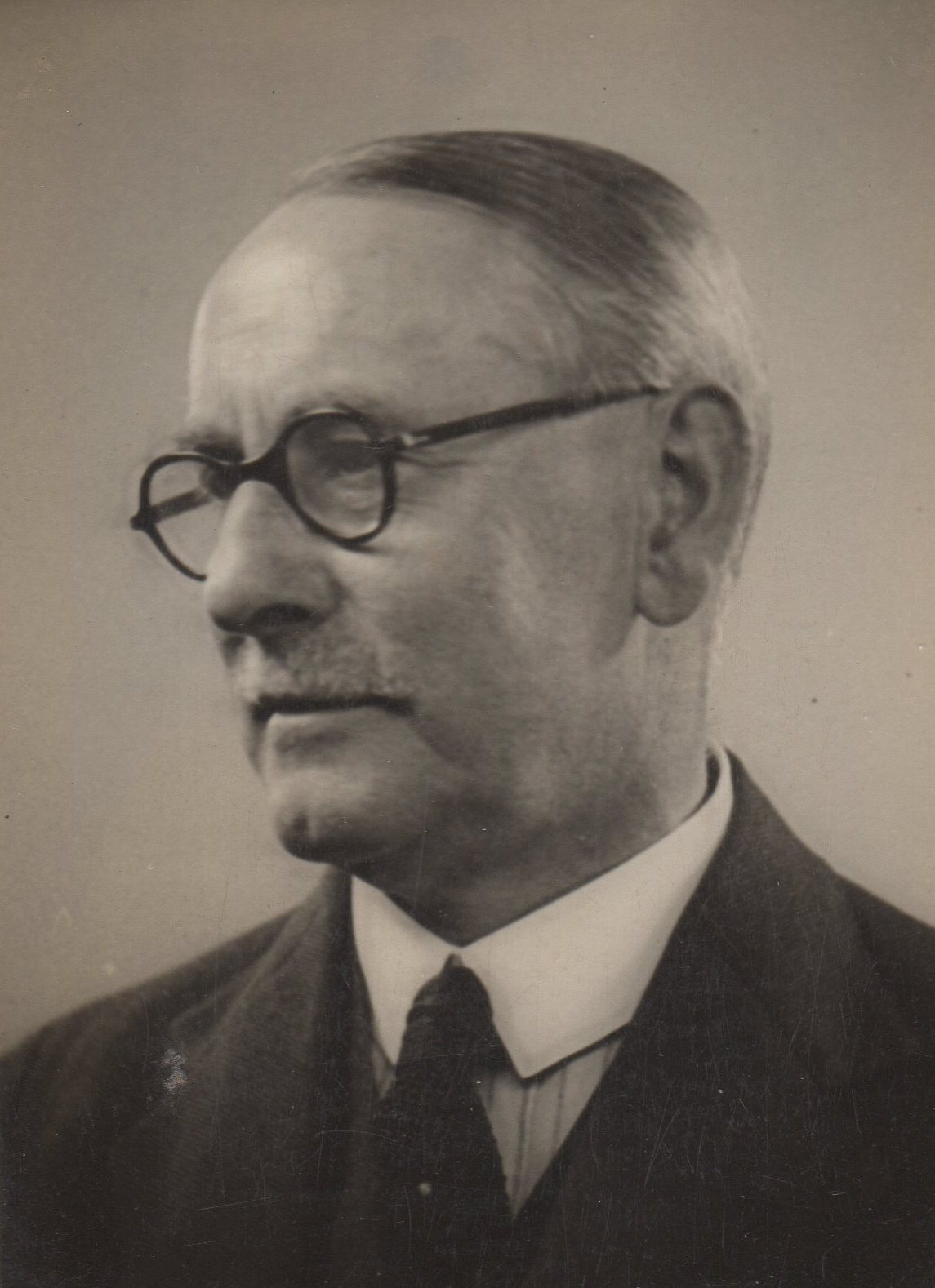
- William Watson in about 1942
- Born: 6 November 1873; Liverpool, England
- Died: 5 August 1961 (aged 87)

William Watson (6 November 1873 – 5 August 1961) was a Liverpool-born racing driver and motoring pioneer. A champion cyclist as a young man, he founded W Watson & Co, cycle and motorcar manufacturer, in 1901. He won the epic 1908 Isle of Man Tourist Trophy Race driving a Hutton-Napier named Little Dorrit. He also raced in Berliet, Vauxhall and Essex cars. He expanded Watson & Co from Liverpool to Chester, Colwyn Bay, London, Birkenhead and Crewe, creating the largest car distributing organisation in the North of England, specialising in Morris and Rolls-Royce cars.

== Early career ==
William Watson was born in 1873, the youngest child of Timothy Watson, a milk dealer in the West Derby area of Liverpool. He won a scholarship to Liverpool College, then became a Solicitor's Clerk, but abandoned the legal profession for cycle racing and manufacture. He was an active member of the Liverpool Wheelers Cycling Club. After earlier outings on penny-farthings, he became 25-mile cycling champion at New Brighton and broke many local speed records. He established Watson & Dickinson, builders of racing bicycles, at 30 Falkner Street, Liverpool, in 1897. He then imported De Dion-Bouton petrol engines to make powered tricycles, and by 1900 was producing and selling the two-seater "W & D Quad". In 1901 he founded W Watson & Co, cycle and motor car manufacturers, and acquired additional premises in Vine Street, Liverpool.

== Pioneering car hire ==
In 1901 he set up a Chester-to-Farndon public hire service, after successfully applying for a Hackney Carriage licence for a motor vehicle, the first in Chester and one of the earliest in the country. He acquired six-second-hand chain-driven Daimler cars and the service ran for about a year, introducing motoring to a large number of people, but it suffered from the unreliability of all cars at the time. The Daimlers were also hired from the Liverpool depot by touring parties to visit places as far afield as Devon and Cornwall. Later he used the cars for transporting Farndon strawberries to Chester and Liverpool.

== Importing French cars ==
In 1902 Watson started importing French cars, initially 10 and 12 hp Georges Richard models, by taking the train to Paris and driving them to Dieppe for shipment to Liverpool. Later he imported Richard-Brasier, de Dion-Bouton, Panhard, Rochet-Schneider and Berliet cars. The Paris connection led to his being granted the Berliet concession in England in 1904.

== Racing Berliets ==
Watson entered the 1906 Graphic Trophy Race, Isle of Man, and came third on a 40 hp Berliet. He entered the 1907 Scottish Reliability Trial, winning a gold medal on the 40 hp Berliet, averaging 22 mpg fuel consumption. The event, for more than a hundred cars, covered over 1000 miles and took a week of timetabled driving, accompanied by a different observer every day, with a daily hill climb. He came second on the 40 hp Berliet in the 1907 Graphic Trophy Race on the Isle of Man. In the 1907 Tourist Trophy Race he drove a Berliet, No 189, but retired after running short of petrol on the 5th lap. This was his first of three drives in the event.

== Victory in the 1908 Tourist Trophy Race ==
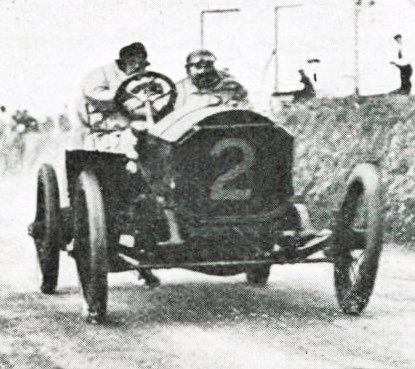
William Watson at the 1908 Tourist Trophy

In August 1908 Watson bought from Selwyn Edge his 1907-built four cylinder racing car known as Little Dorrit, after being impressed by its performance at the newly constructed Brooklands track. The car was named a Hutton rather than a Napier because Edge had been successfully promoting the merits of six cylinder Napiers and did not want to be associated with a four cylinder car. Hutton, a young motor dealer, had been allowed to form a separate company to run the four cylinder Napier-made cars. Three Huttons were in preparation for the big race.

Watson won the Tourist Trophy ("Four Inch") Race on 24 September, driving Little Dorrit. The 34-year-old Watson and his mechanic completed the 337-mile race in less than seven hours, averaging 50 miles per hour. Before the event there had been an outcry that motor racing on public roads was too dangerous but the event took place without serious casualties. His 5.8-litre Hutton, race number '2’, started in pole position. The ex-champion racing cyclist kept his engine from overheating on the Manx hills by coasting down hills in neutral, a tricky procedure when brakes were only fitted to the rear wheels. He said that the steel studs on his solid rubber Dunlop tyres caused skidding until they wore down. It was his first victory on the racetrack. The winner's RAC medal was inscribed 'W Watson – Hutton', the words 'Napier car' being added later.

== Racing Vauxhalls ==
Watson was a driver in the Vauxhall racing team from 1912 to 1914, which had mixed success. A fellow driver was Harry Ferguson, who would become a famous tractor manufacturer.

In the 1912 French Grand Prix/Coupe de l'Auto race at Dieppe on 25 June, Watson's A-type Vauxhall, in the 3-litre class, was forced to retire in the second lap with a broken gudgeon pin. In the next year's Coupe de l'Auto he was forced to retire in the 12th and final lap, after 'a bad skid'. Mechanical failure again caused Watson to retire, this time with a broken crankshaft, on the first lap of the Isle of Man Tourist Trophy in 1914. It was his third and final appearance in that event. In the 1914 French Grand Prix at Lyon his Vauxhall retired with a carburettor problem on the second lap.

He had more success locally. At Liverpool Motor Club's first speed trials at Colwyn Bay on 5 July 1913, Watson achieved the fastest time in both the standing kilometre and the flying half-mile, averaging 64 mph, on a 20 hp Vauxhall. At the Club's 1920 speed trials, held at Storeton near Birkenhead, Watson won four classes driving a 23.8 hp 30–98 Vauxhall and came second in two others driving a 17.9 hp Essex.

== W Watson and Co ==
In 1905 Watson became agent for Napier cars thanks to his cycling connection with Selwyn Edge. He later wrote that he considered Napiers to have been the best British cars for about the first seven years of the century.

The company moved to larger premises at 56–58 Renshaw Street, Liverpool in 1907. Watson became one of the first Rolls-Royce agents in 1908, having tested a Silver Ghost the previous year, been impressed by its quietness and performance and having immediately applied for the franchise. Privately in Wales he demonstrated it to Selwyn Edge, who had believed that there was no better car than the Napier.

The company became agents in 1913 for Morris cars, made by Sir William Morris, an earlier cycling acquaintance who had become a business associate, and moved into bigger premises in Renshaw Street. The new showrooms, on four floors, were the biggest in the north of England and were formally opened by Morris.

During World War I, the Watson workshops manufactured shell cases, shrapnel noses, aeroplane propellers and fuselages. After the war Watson took an interest in American cars, importing several hundred Essex cars. The company held franchises for Essex, Hudson and Dodge.

From 1921 Watson expanded his company in several directions: Chester (Grosvenor Motor Company, Foregate Street, acquired 1921); London (Chelsea embankment, service facilities and a fleet of taxis); and Birkenhead (Hamilton Square, opened 1924, enlarged 1926). During the 1920s and 30s the firm gained a reputation for building special bodies on Morris and Rolls-Royce chassis. In 1930 the Jaguar franchise was added.

In 1931, a motor show known as "Liverpool's Olympia", the second of its kind, was held at the Watson Renshaw Street premises. About 100 cars were on display.

The Watson workshop premises were further extended in 1936 on three floors at Oldham Street, Liverpool. Morris servicing was on the first floor; Morris spare parts operation, body building and repair on the third floor; servicing of other cars on the second floor (including Talbot, Alvis, Jaguar, Rolls-Royce, Bentley, AC); and chassis work in the basement. The second-hand car stock had overflowed from the Renshaw Street premises into an old German church next door. Watsons had showrooms and workshops at Chester, Colwyn Bay and Birkenhead.

During World War II, Watsons repaired Anson fuselages, then became principal repairers of Mosquito aircraft, and in Bootle undertook assembly and repair work for the US armed forces.

Watsons became a public limited company in 1953 and in 1957 acquired Slack & Mickle in Crewe.

When William Watson died in 1961 he was still responsible for the destiny of his firm, which had become the largest distributor of motor vehicles in the north-west of England, serving 80 motor dealers and employing 600 staff.

W. WATSON CO LTD IN THE 1960s.

In the 1960s the W. Watson Company Limited premises filled the both sides of Oldham Street Liverpool with the used car department fronting on Renshaw Street. The main showrooms were located two minutes away on Bold Street. As one faced up the cobblestoned Oldham street to the right was the used car department featuring its own glass cylinder petrol pump. Next, the entrance to the fully functioning blacksmith shop housed in the basement of the main building. The Main doors where a little further up the street which allowed access to the British Motor Corporation (BMC) floor. Here Morris, Austin, Wolsey and MG makes received their complete servicing. All of these models, with the steering wheels on the left, were also serviced for shipment to the USA. On the same floor was the original machine shop with machinery dating back to the war years were armaments were made. One large stationary engine provided the power through a series of belts and pulleys for some fifteen lathes, grinders, shapers and various other machines in the workshop.

A staff consisting of management, reception, mechanics and apprentices numbering in the fifties made the ground floor a hive of activity. The recent introduction of the Mini with its accompanying 'Cooper' and 'Cooper S' added to the workload of the shop floor. A technological breakthrough was made in the early 60s when it was discovered that the removal of the mini's engine was far easier and more time efficient if it was extricated through the bonnet opening rather than lifting the entire body over the power unit and suspension assembly. A Watson innovation? Possibly.

At the far end of the BMC floor was an elevator that connected the lower BMC floor to the two floors above namely the Jaguar on the second floor and the auto body shop on the top floor. The Jaguar department shared the space with Rolls-Royce and the other exclusive cars like Alfa Romeo. This unwanted union was to end when a new facility was built that would house the Rolls, Electrical and Lubrication departments as W. Watson saw greater expansion on Oldham Street.

On the left of the street starting at the lower end saw the Commercial Vehicle Dept. Watson's was the main distributor for all BMC trucks and heavy duty vehicles as well. The parts, radiator and battery departments took the remainder of the space on Oldham Street with the Rolls-Royce new facility finishing off the top of the street.

The Company provided employment for many including an annual intake of apprentices from the Liverpool area. Twenty plus 15- and 16-year-old indentured apprentices were dispersed throughout the many departments where they received training under the supervision of journeymen craftspeople. Although changes came, BMC becoming British Leyland and a flurry of new service managers over the years, the commitment to training was always held in the highest regard. The Aitken Brothers, Bill and Jack, provided the everyday management on the shop floor with foremen such as Bill Roberts, Jack James, Norman Lees and Alan Duvall providing the hands on direction for their respective staffs.

In the late sixties while the name remained W. Watson & Co Ltd. the Oliver Rix Motor Group took over ownership of the company.

Present day, 2017, the building(s) on Oldham Street are still there with the Main build serving as a car park.

== Family life ==
William Watson was married twice, first to Maude Taylor with whom he had a daughter Agnes Mildred, born 1900. They divorced and in 1916 he married Georgina Lilian Cooper, with whom he had two daughters, Barbara born 1918 and Joyce 1921. The family home from 1927 was Gayton Wood, at Heswall in the Wirral Peninsula. He died there in 1961, aged 87, and was survived by his daughters and eight grandchildren.

Starting in the 1950s, Watson renewed his childhood acquaintance with cattle and dairy farming, buying farms in Cheshire, Caernarvonshire, Buckinghamshire and Surrey, amounting to about 1500 acres in all. He also took an interest in hotels, acquiring the Chain Bridge Hotel in Llangollen around 1960.

== Anniversaries of the 1908 Four Inch Race ==
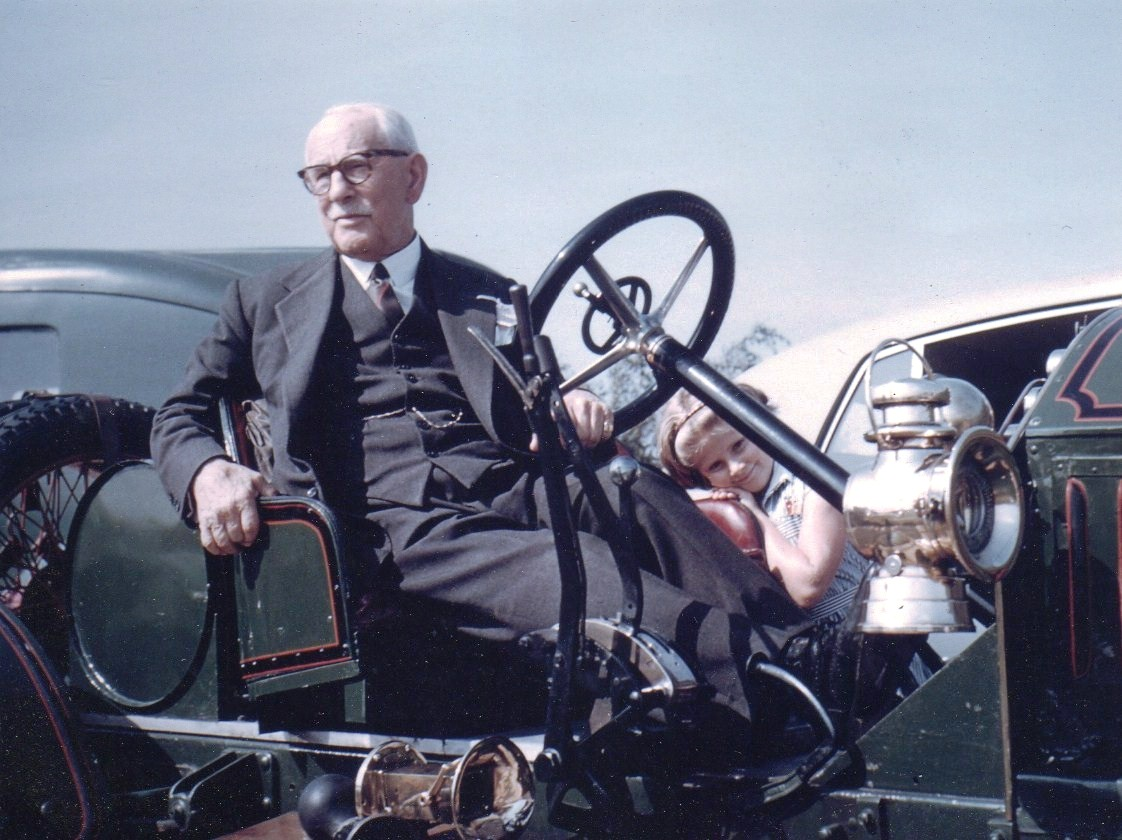
Watson reunited with Little Dorrit at Goodwood in 1958

To celebrate the 50th anniversary of the 1908 race, at the 23rd Tourist Trophy race at Goodwood on 13 September 1958 the 83-year-old Watson drove a lap of honour in his winning car, the Hutton-Napier Little Dorrit.

To celebrate the centenary of the race in 2008, the Veteran Car Club of Great Britain organised an exhibition at their Ashwell, Hertfordshire, headquarters on the history of the Isle of Man Tourist Trophy, 1905 to 1922. The exhibition was formally opened by one of Watson's granddaughters. The club rally was timed so that the veteran cars reached Ashwell at 3 pm on 24 September; exactly 100 years after Watson crossed the finishing line.
