= Fernand Gabriel =

French pre-war racing driver (1878 - 1943)

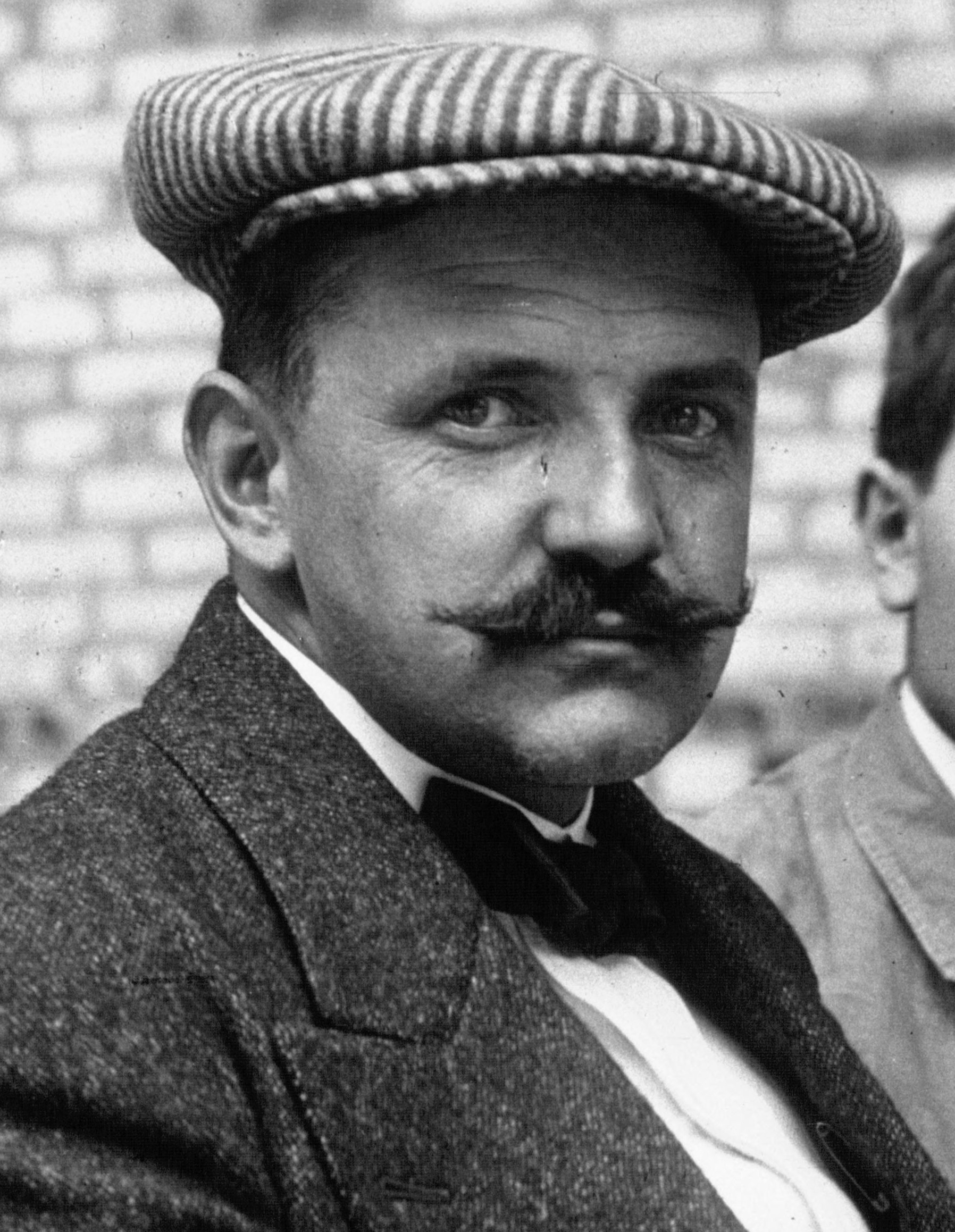
- Gabriel at the 1914 French Grand Prix
- Nationality: French
- Born: 30 April 1878 Paris (17th arrondissement), France
- Died: 3 April 1943 (aged 64) La Garenne-Colombes
- Retired: 1928
- Years active: 1899-1914, 1924-1928

Fernand Gabriel (30 April 1878 - 9 September 1943) was a French racing driver.

== Career ==
His first appearance in racing came in 1899, when he took part in the voiturette class in the Paris-Bordeaux race, on a Decauville; later in the year he took part (on the same car) in the first Tour de France Automobile.

In 1901, he moved to Darracq, and took part in the Paris-Berlin race, although he did not finish. His first achievement was coming 2nd in the Circuit des Ardennes on a Mors model Z - this time in the "big" car category - and took his first victory kilometre sprints at Deauville and Château-Thierry (near Reims) the following year.

His greatest achievement was winning the 1903 Paris-Madrid race, which was stopped at Bordeaux because of the number of fatalities on the primitive French roads. As was usual in town-to-town races, cars left one at a time at regular intervals, and the winner was the one with the lowest elapsed time. With starting number 168, Gabriel was not one of the first hundred starters, yet he was the third to arrive at Bordeaux, and a clear leader when times were taken into account; the stopping of the race meant he was the winner by default.

Probably as a result of this performance, he was chosen to represent France in the 1903 Gordon Bennett Cup at Athy in Ireland, and finished 4th, despite his Mors suffering a misfire and giving away a significant amount of power to the winning Mercedes.

Gabriel was meant to have the honour of being the first starter at the first Grand Prix, the 1906 Grand Prix de l'ACF, being part of the de Diétrich team which had drawn start number 1, and being the leading driver; however the engine stalled at the start and he was the second car away. The problems with his car were such that he did not complete a lap.

His best Grand Prix result came in 1911, in the Grand Prix de France. The race was not arranged by the Automobile Club de France, which had decided not to arrange a race that year, but by the AC de la Sarthe et de l’Ouest, and only attracted 14 starters; Gabriel came 3rd in a Rolland-Pilain.

Gabriel concluded his career in 1928, with his fifth and final appearance at the 24 Hours of Le Mans, all for the Ariès concern.

He died when the Renault factory, where he was working, was bombed in the Second World War.

== Private life ==
Gabriel was married twice; firstly, to Berthe Cerisay in 1901 in Paris, and the second time to Huguette Detrez in Colombes in 1938.

== Images ==
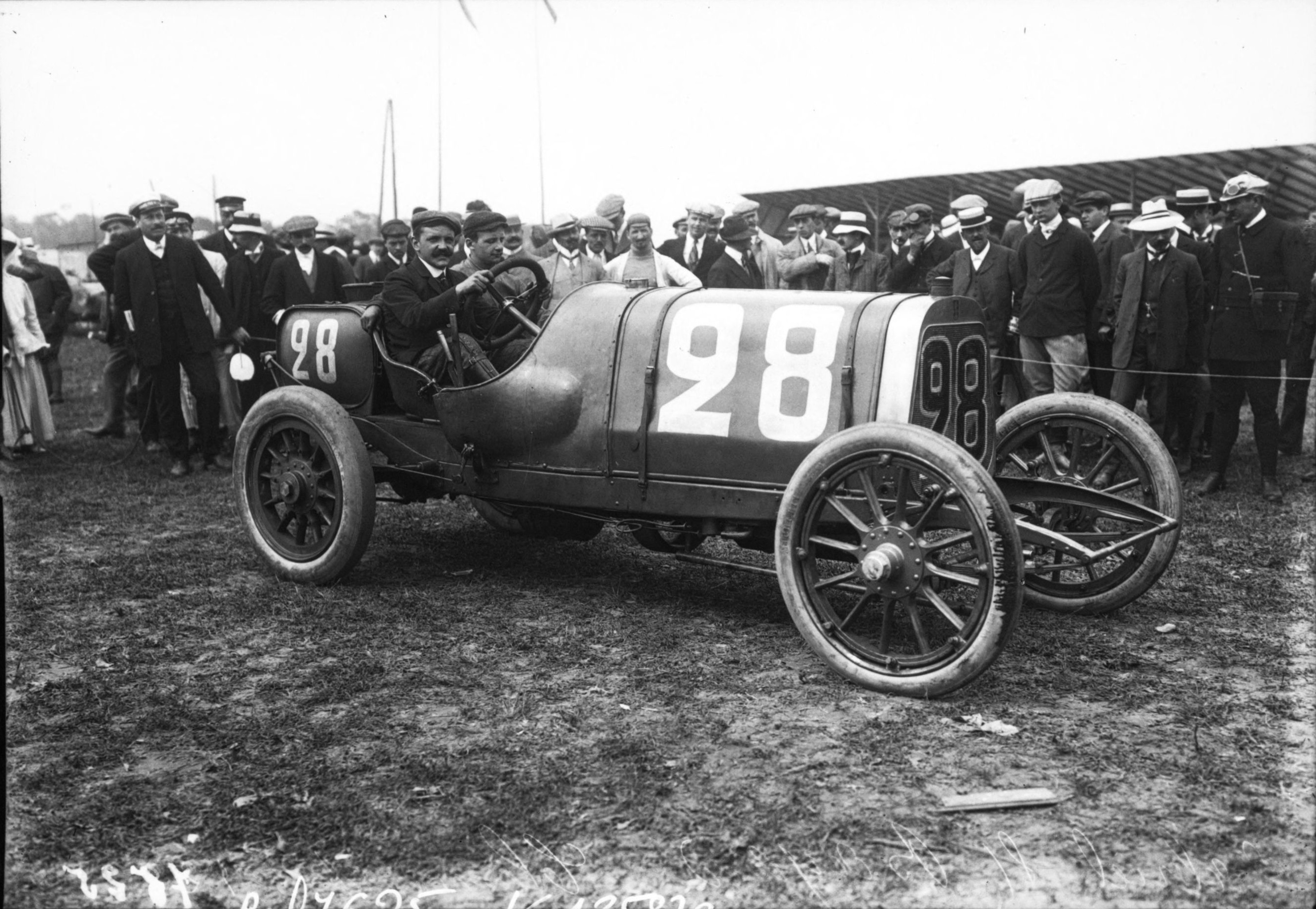
1908 Grand Prix de l'ACF, on a Clément-Bayard;

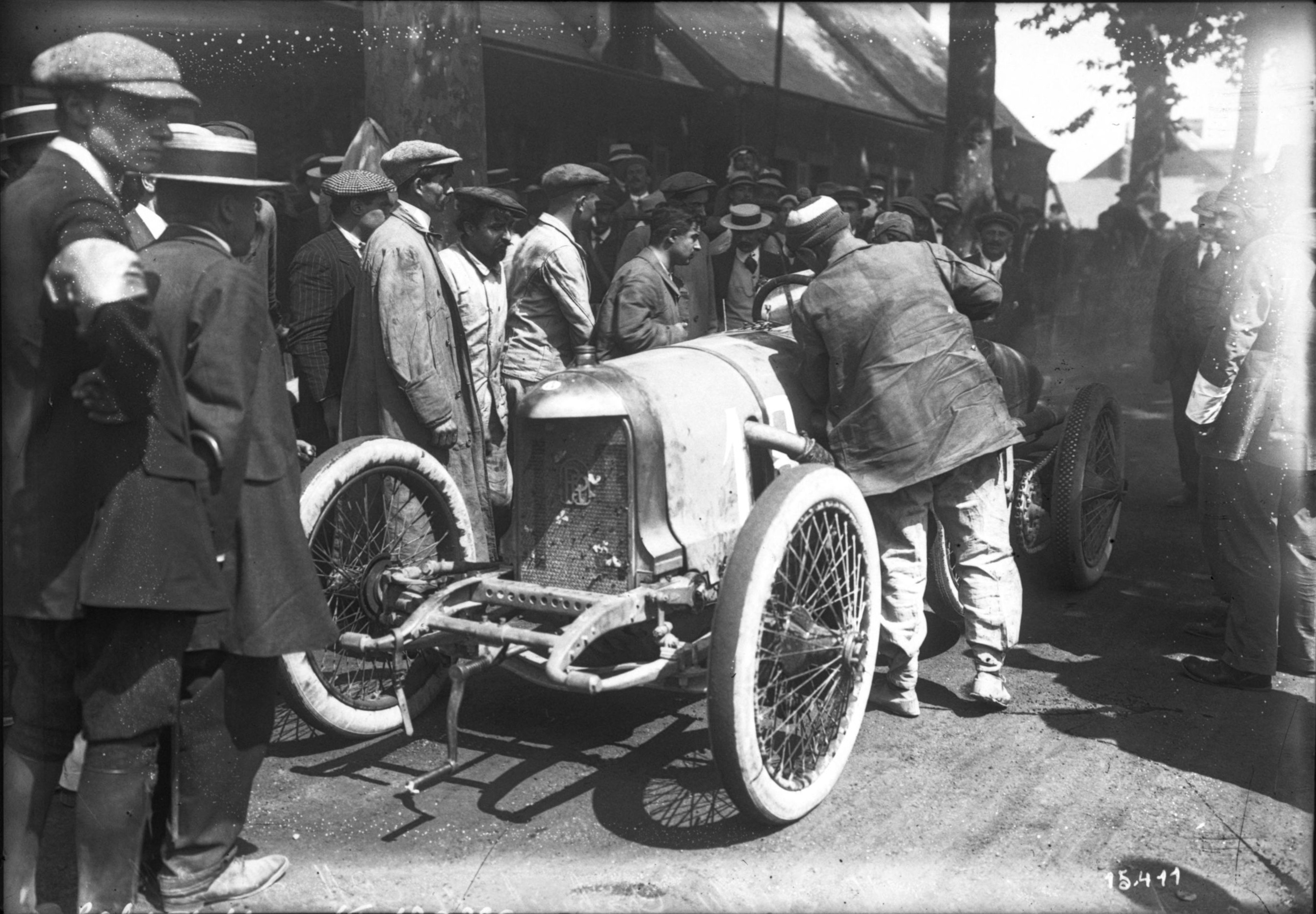
1911 Grand Prix de France, on a Rolland-Pilain;

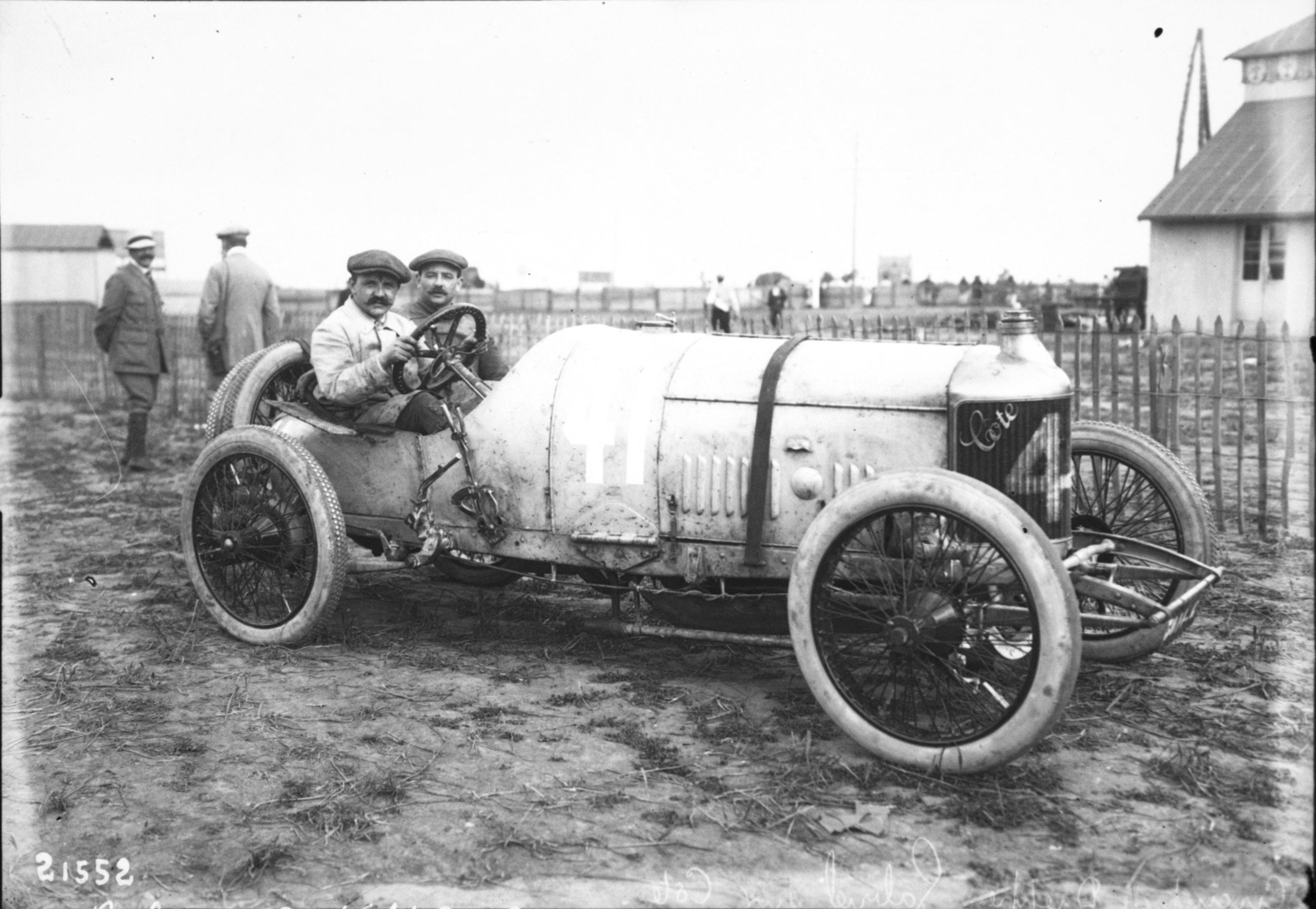
1912 Grand Prix de l'ACF, on a Côte;

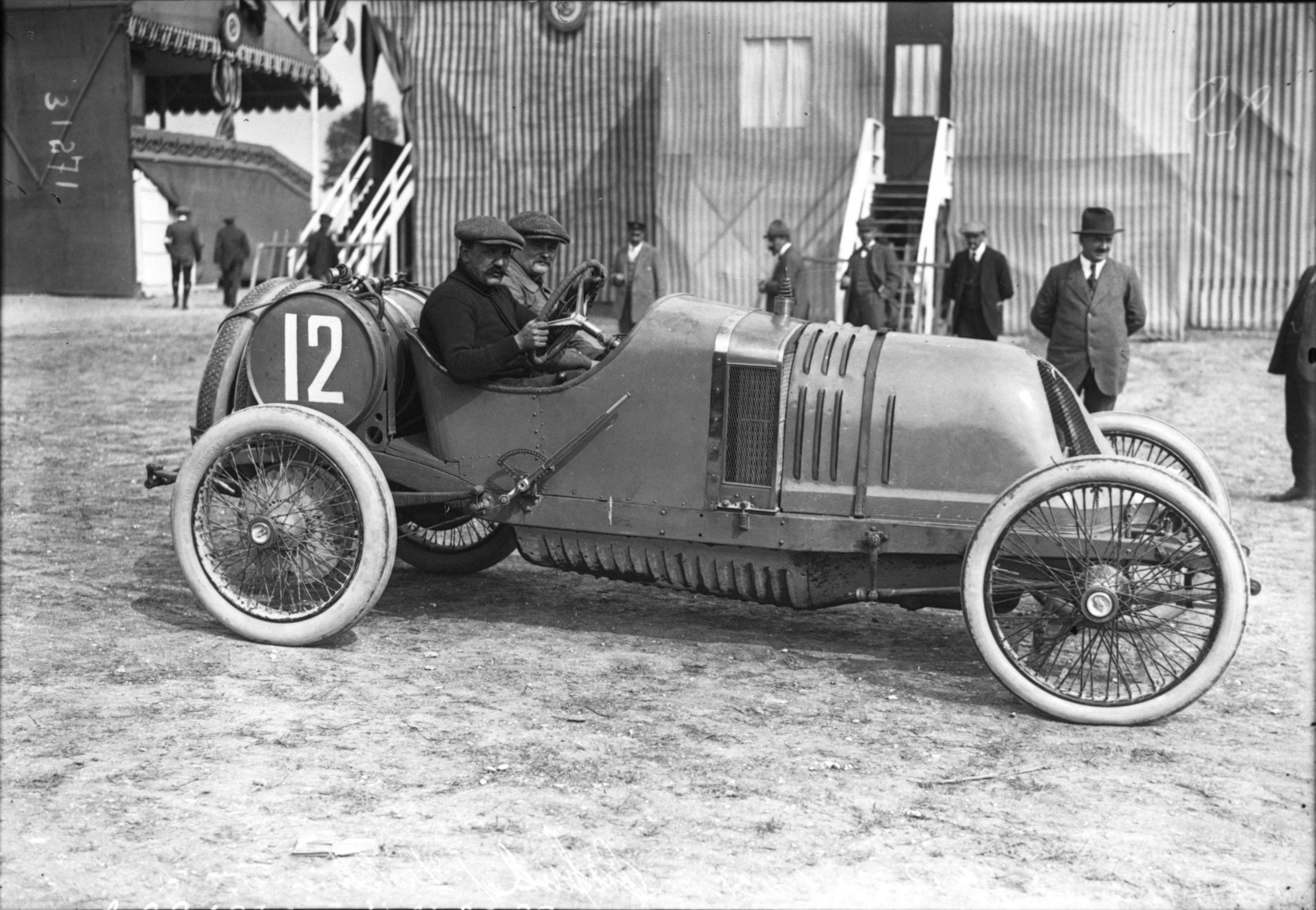
1913 Grand Prix de l'ACF, on a Th. Schneider;

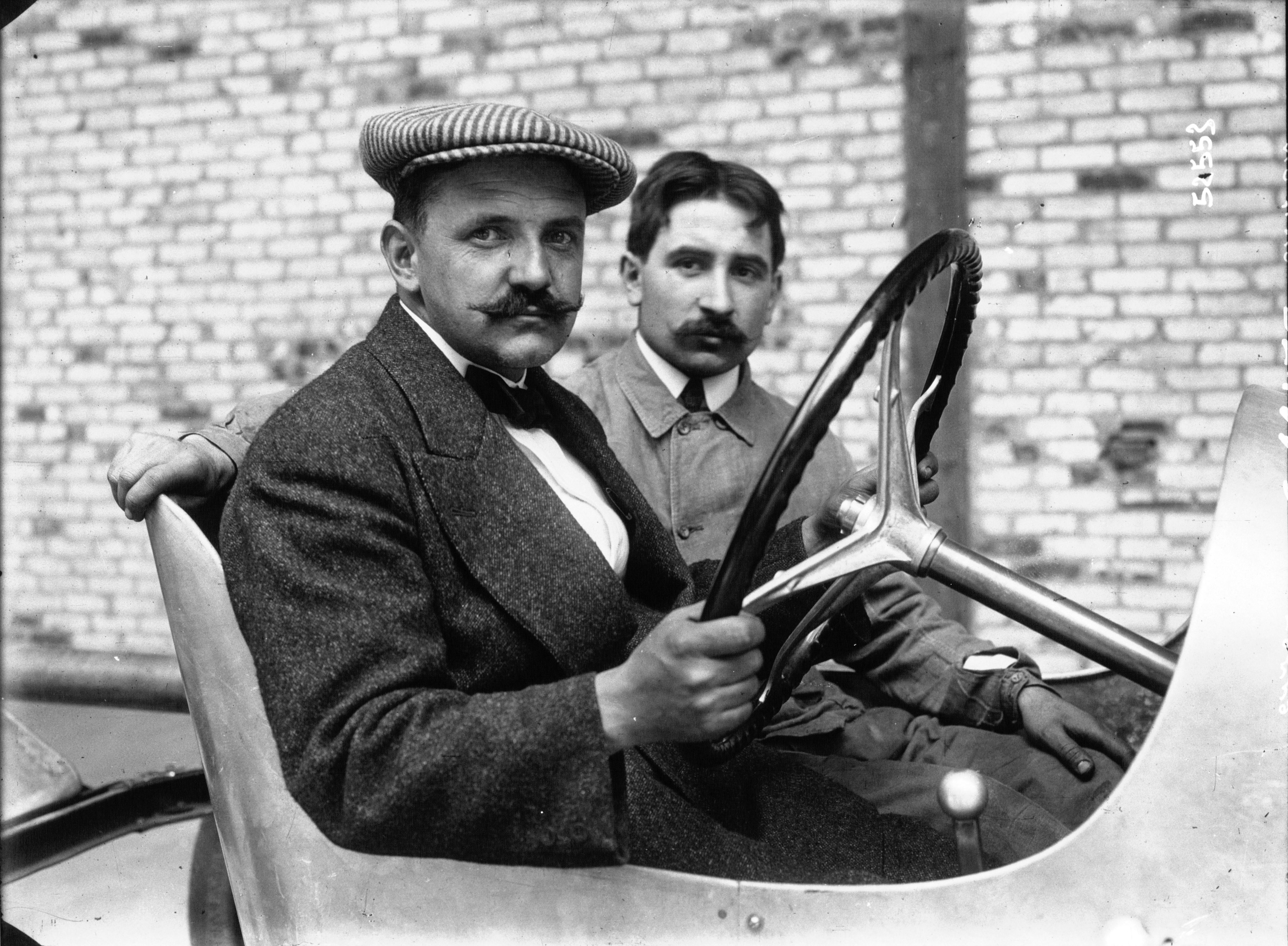
1914 Grand Prix de l'ACF, on a Th. Schneider).
