= Compagnie Nationale Excelsior =

Belgian car manufacturer

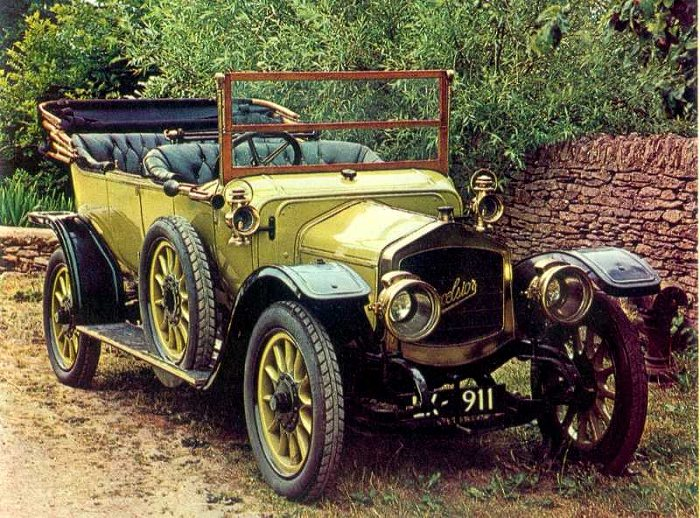
Excelsior (1911)

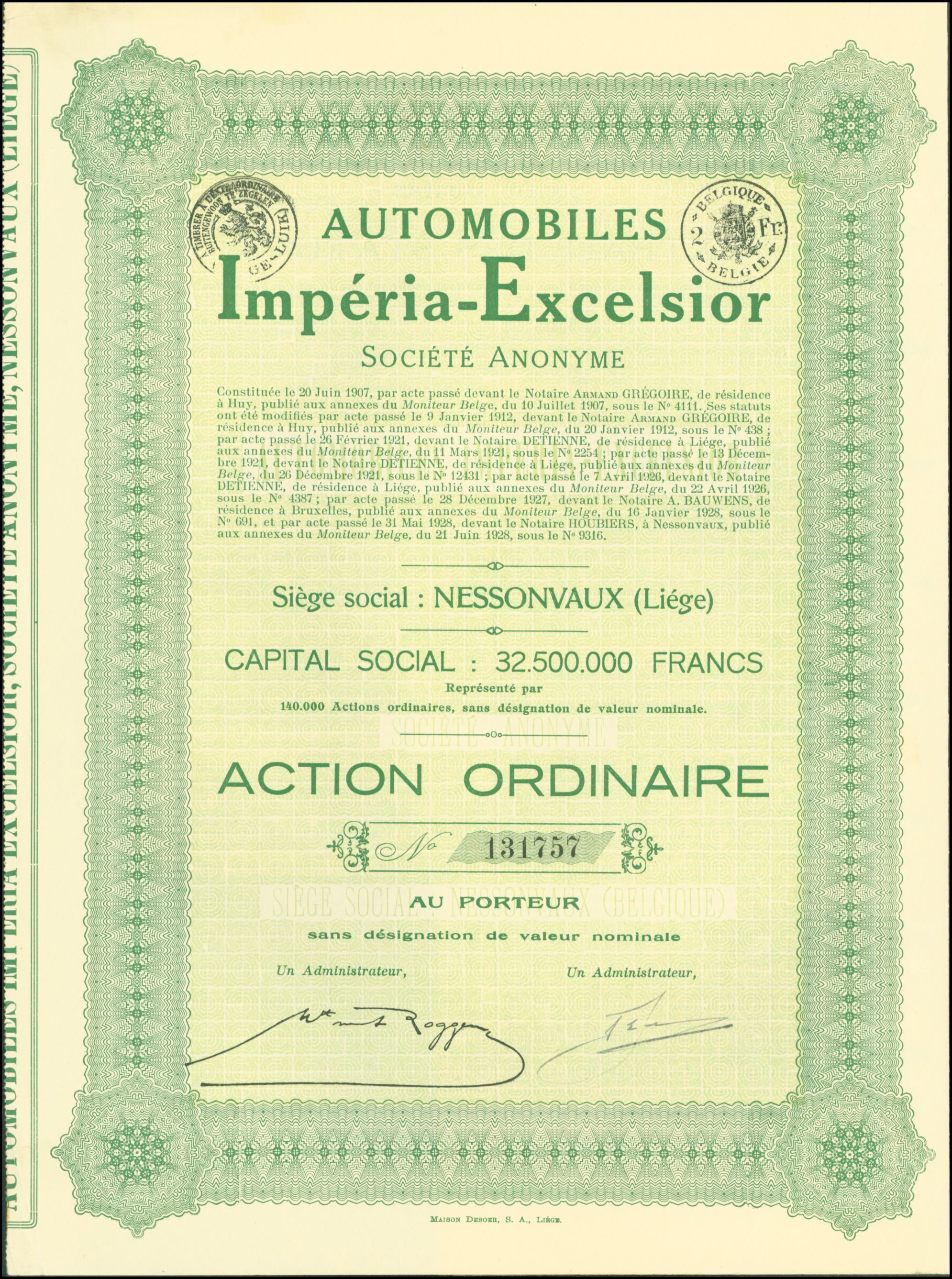
Share of the Automobiles Impéria-Excelsior SA, issued 21. June 1928

Compagnie Nationale Excelsior, more simply known as Excelsior, was a Belgian car manufacturer established by Arthus de Coninck in Brussels in 1903. The company first started to manufacture cars in 1904.

The first models were powered by a two- or four-cylinder Aster engine. In 1907, however, the company made headlines with the Adex, powered by a six-cylinder side-valve engine with a capacity of nine litres. This car's chassis could be easily modified for Grand Prix racing. In 1912, the car took second place in the French Grand Prix, and when the Belgian royal family purchased an Excelsior, the advertising value proved considerable.

A second version of the Adex came out in 1920, with a smaller 4767 cc, six-cylinder engine including an overhead camshaft. The Adex inspired the design of the later Excelsior Albert I, which was powered by a six-cylinder engine with a capacity of 5346 cc. An Excelsior Albert I finished 6th and another 9th in the 1923 24 Hours of Le Mans endurance race.

In 1929, the company was sold to its competitor Impéria Automobiles. Until 1932, the company was called Impéria-Excelsior, after which the name Excelsior was dropped.
