= Victor Rigal =

French racing driver (1879–1941)

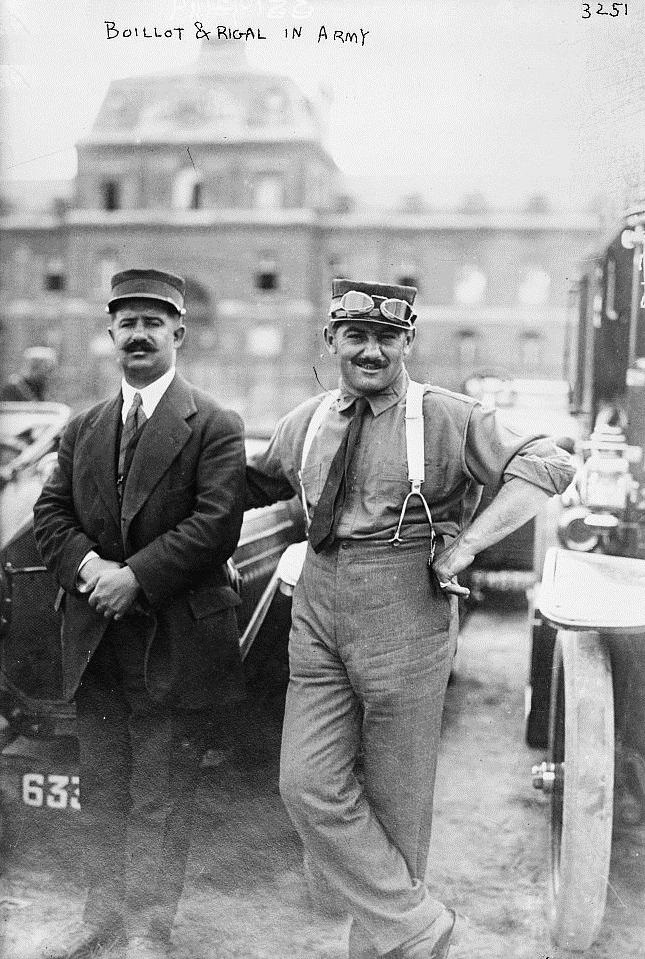
- Rigal to the right of Georges Boillot during their military service in 1914
- Nationality: France
- Born: 22 September 1879 Paris, France
- Died: June 1941 (aged 61)

Victor Rigal (22 September 1879 – June 1941) was a French racing driver.

== Biography ==
He began his career in motorsport at the Critérium des Coeurs in 1898, on a tricycle made by De Dion-Bouton. He won the Levassor Prize for Motorcycles in 1901, and obtained the record of the kilometre in the same year at 33 seconds, at nearly 110 km/h in Achères, thanks to a twin-cylinder engine from Buchet. In 1902, he won the kilometre-long Deauville category for motorcycles at almost 125 km/h, still with the Buchet engine (32CV 4.3L), with the same vehicle still allowing him in November to reach more than 124 km/h in the Parisian region on another kilometer, accomplished in 29 seconds. He then took part in the Paris-Madrid Motor Race in 1903, on a Mors type Z. In 1906, he finished fourth in the Targa Florio in an Itala 35/40HP, becoming one of the official Werner drivers on tri-cars. He then returned to participate in the Italian event the following year on a Berliet, and in 1907 was hired by Darracq Motor Engineering Company.

In 1908, he won in Boulogne-sur-Mer the hill climb races of both Ponte de Baincthun and Porte Gayole, on a Clément-Bayard on the same day.

He finished 3rd in the 1912 Grand Prix de France in Dieppe on a Sunbeam, winning the Coupe l'Auto category for 3 Litre cars. He came 4th in 1908 on a Clément-Bayard, 5th in 1907 on a Darracq, and 7th in 1914 on a Peugeot EX5.

He also participated in the Grand Prix of the United States in 1908, where he finished 7th and obtained places of esteem at the Cup of Carts where he is often registered.

In 1922, he won the Côte de Poix (near Amiens in Picardy) on a Panhard 20HP, then that of Saint-Martin (Boulogne-sur-Mer) the following year with the same car, while during the same time Louis Rigal started his own course in motorsport. One of Victor's final races was in 1929 at the Mille Miglia in an Alfa Romeo.

In 1924, Victor Rigal was appointed the Commissioner General of the Capital Rally of Deauville, organized by the ACO.

In the field of aviation, Victor Rigal was the owner of a Voisin-Antoinette biplane in the late 1900s, which he announced at the Cannes meeting. He then flew on Sommer-Gnome biplanes in 1910 which belonged to him too.
