= Th. Schneider =

French automobile manufacturer

Société anonyme des automobiles Th. Schneider
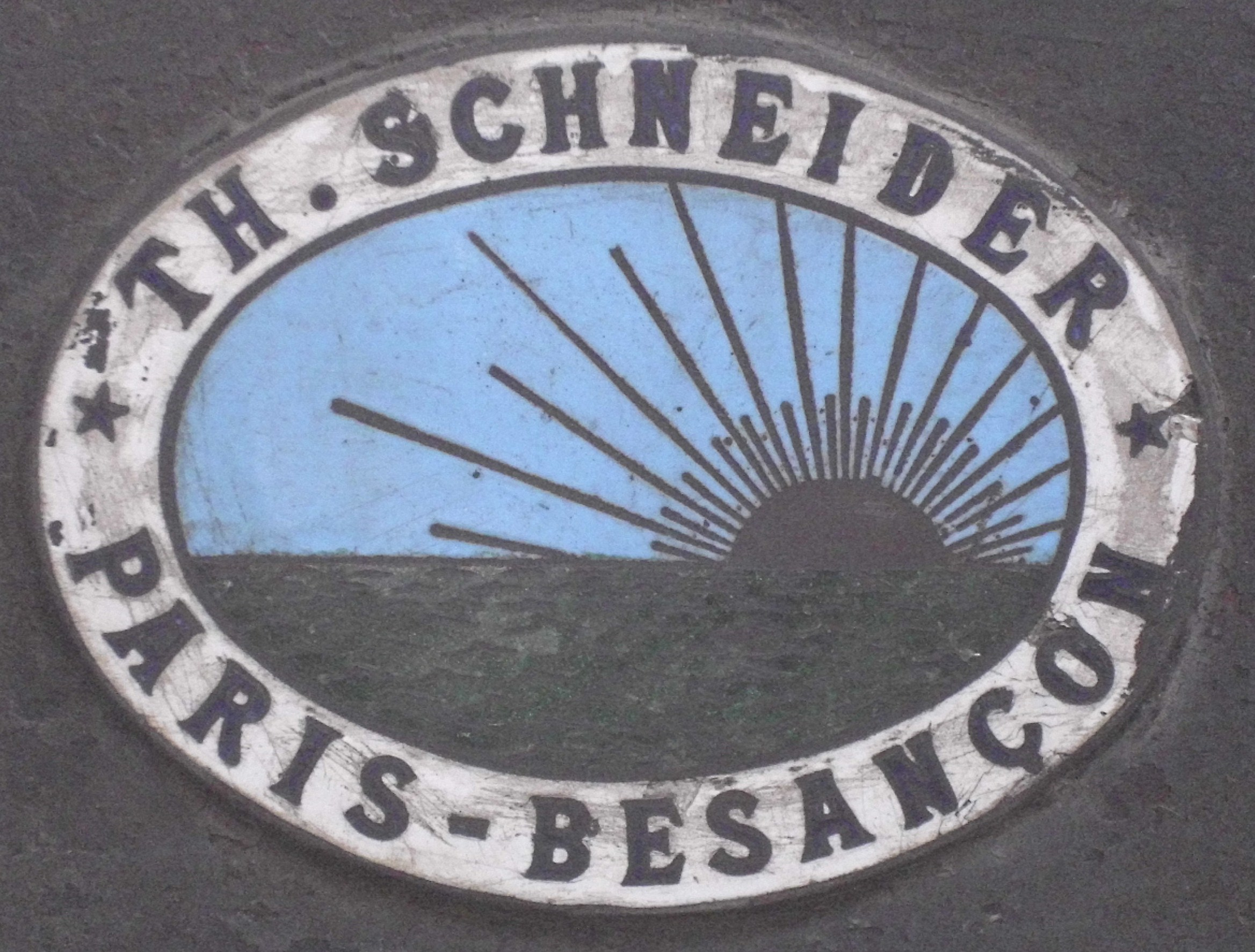

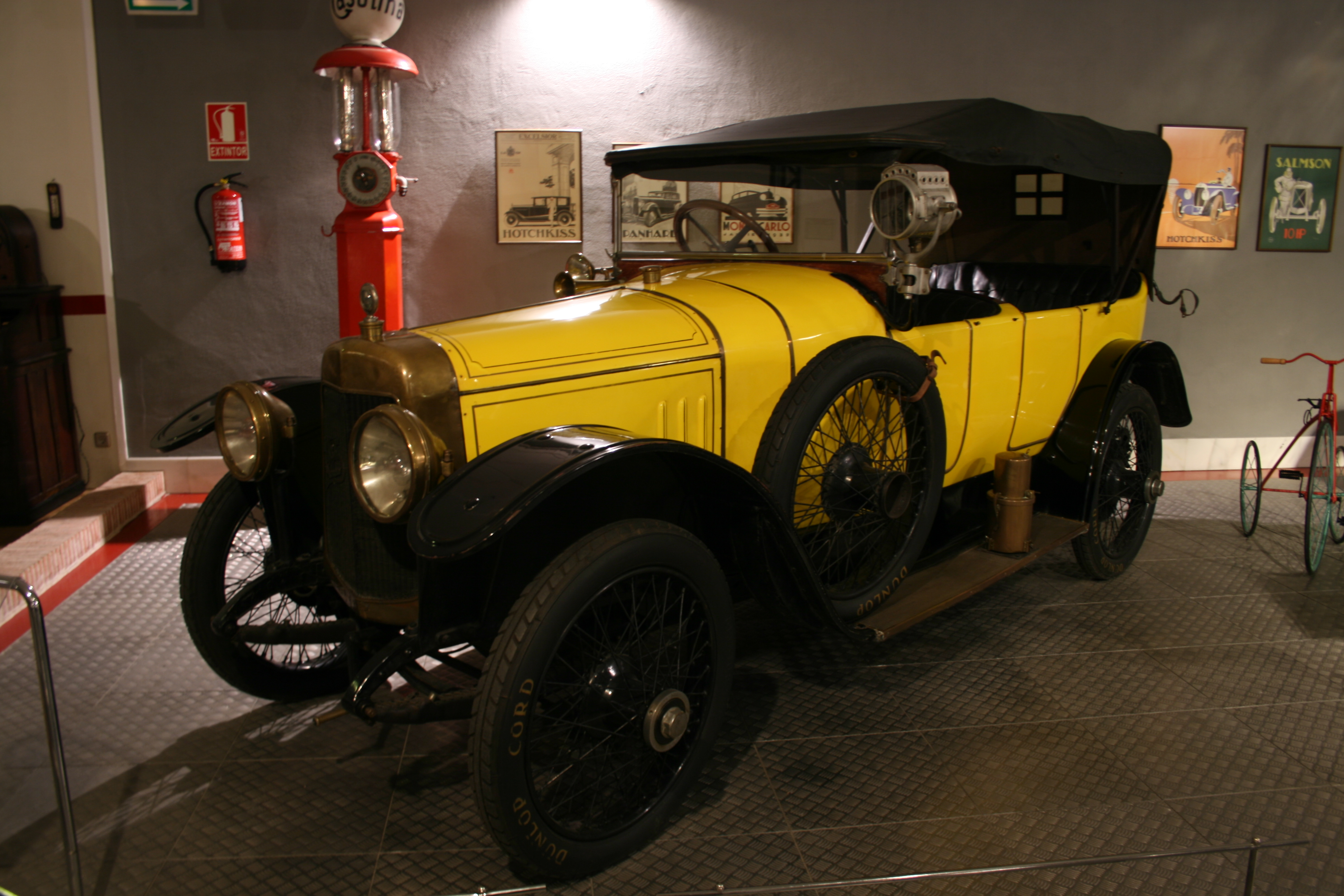
- Founded: 1910
- Defunct: 1930
- Headquarters: Besançon, France
- Key people: Th. Schneider
- Products: Automobiles

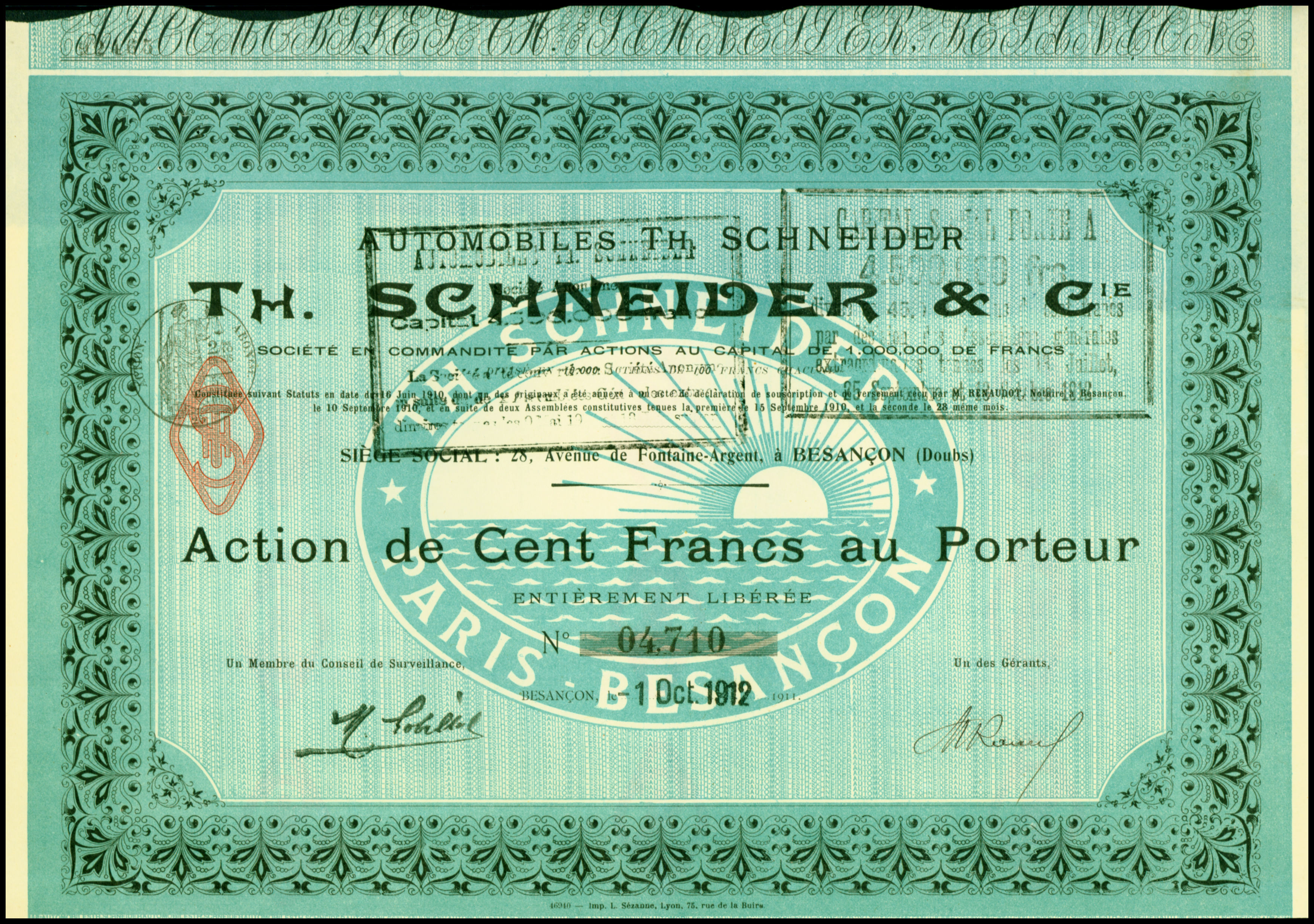
Share of the Automobiles Th. Schneider & Cie, issued 1. October 1912

Th. Schneider was a French automobile manufacturer.

The Société anonyme des automobiles Th. Schneider was registered at Besançon on 16 June 1910. Vehicle production finally ended early in 1930, some ten months after the company's second declaration of bankruptcy, in March 1929.

A significant proportion of the manufacturer's output was exported to England.

== The founder and his name ==
By the time he established the company that carried his name, Schneider was already a very well seasoned automobile manufacturer. With Edouard Rochet, Schneider had been involved since 1889 or 1894 with the Lyon based Rochet-Schneider company.

Although Schneider had apparently been registered at birth with the name Théodore Schneider, many friends and business partners knew him as "Théophile Schneider". Use of the name Th. Schneider for his automobile company avoided the need to arbitrate between the two names.

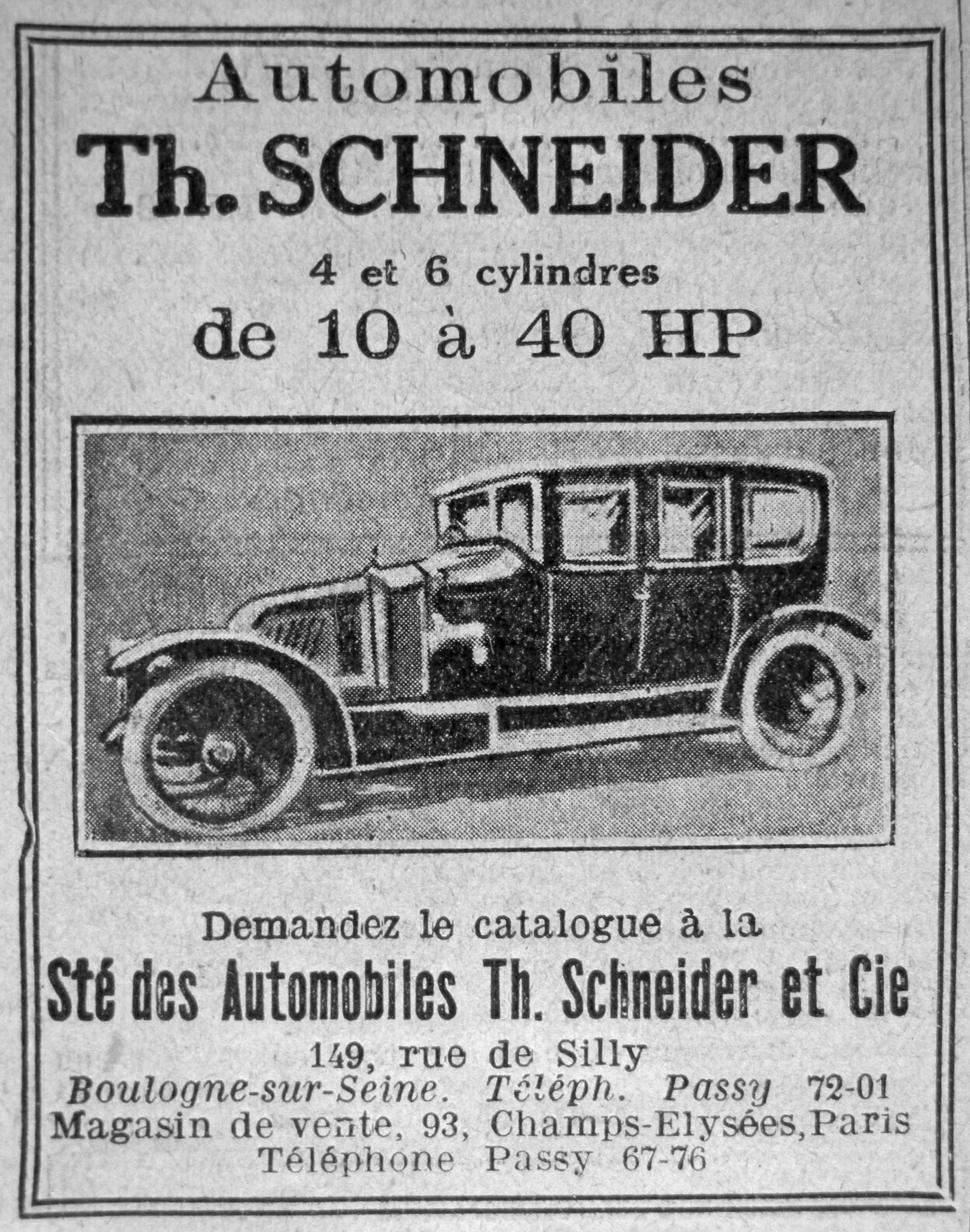
Th. Schneider publicity, published in Le pays de France, 1st year, nbr 3, page 4, 10 July 1914.

== The cars ==
=== Pre-war ===
The manufacturer started out producing a range of cars with side valve 4-cylinder and 6-cylinder engines. In most respects these were conventional cars, apart from the "dashboard mounted" radiators, positioned ahead of the driver but behind the (front mounted) engine. By the time war broke out in August 1914, the Th. Schneider range comprised seven 4-cylinder engined cars with engine sizes that ranged from 1.8-litres to 6.1-litres. There was also a 3.2-litre 6-cylinder engined model.

During these years the manufacturer also participated in motor racing, taking part in the French Grand Prix in two successive years.

=== 1920s ===
In October 1919 the manufacturer took a stand at the 15th Paris Motor Show, and was already exhibiting a range of four different cars, with wheelbases of between 3,000 mm (118.1 in) and 3,400 mm (133.9 in). They all used 4-cylinder engines with cylinder diameters that placed them respectively in the 12HP, 14HP, 18HP and 26HP car tax bands. The engine capacities were 2,292cc, 3,030cc, 3,958cc and 5,500cc. The cars offered for the 1920 model year were not strikingly different from those that had been offered before the war, but the radiators were mounted in front of the engines, which by now was becoming standard practice across most of the French auto-industry (although Renault would persist in placing the radiator behind the engine till 1929). During the early 1920s the Th. Schneider range became broader (and more complex).

The business prospered through the middle 1920s. One of the best remembered models, built since 1922, was the Th. Schneider 10HP which sat on a 3,000 mm (118.1 in) wheelbase, and was powered by a 1,947cc engine that was offered with a side-valve engine for "normal" use or with overhead valves in a "sport" version. At the 19th Paris Motor Show in October 1924 the manufacturer was offering this car with a "Torpedo" type body for 29,000 francs. From the volume makers, a "Torpedo" bodied Renault 10HP was listed only 22,500 francs at the same show and a comparably sized "all-steel" Citroën Type B10 was offered for even less, but the mass-produced Citroën still had serious structural issues to overcome, and at this stage the French automarket was still able to absorb cars in this class from the smaller automakers as well as from the high volume companies.

== Financial Troubles ==
The company was declared bankrupt for the first time in November 1921, but was able to persuade the court to permit resumption of its activities thirteen months later. Th. Schneider was then able to enjoy several years of successful business due to the excellent reputation of its cars. Nevertheless, financial problems hit the business again in 1928, ending in a second bankruptcy in March 1929. Production was progressively run down, presumably in order to use up existing inventory, but early in 1930 the factory doors were closed for the last time.
