= Albert Guyot =

French racing driver (1881–1947)

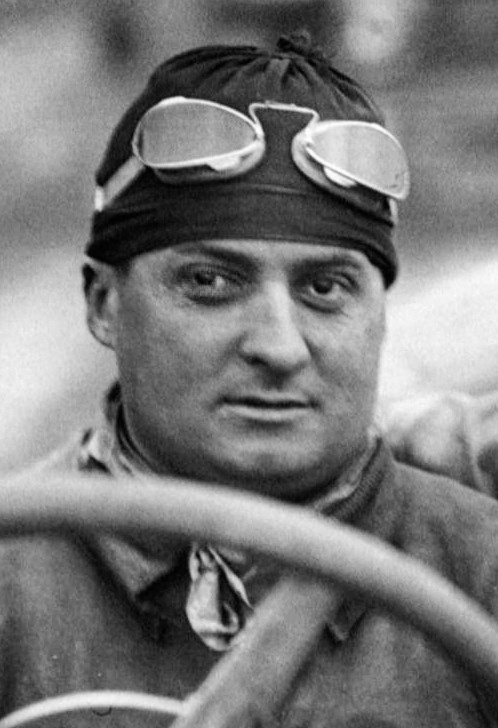
- Guyot in 1914
- Born: Albert Abel Noël Hippolyte Guyot; 25 December 1881 Saint-Jean-de-Braye, Loiret, France
- Died: 24 May 1947 (aged 65) Neuilly-sur-Seine, Seine, France

Champ Car career
- 5 races run over 5 years
- Best finish: 21st (1921)
- First race: 1913 Indianapolis 500 (Indianapolis)
- Last race: 1926 Indianapolis 500 (Indianapolis)
| Wins | Podiums | Poles |
|---|---|---|
| 0 | 1 | 0 |

Albert Abel Noël Hippolyte Guyot (25 December 1881 – 24 May 1947) was a French racing driver. He was one of the first Europe-based drivers to travel to America in order to compete in the Indianapolis 500.

Guyot was one of four drivers who competed for Duesenberg in the 1921 French Grand Prix, the first in which a U.S. make participated. His teammate, Jimmy Murphy won, while Guyot finished sixth.

== Motorsports career results ==
=== Indianapolis 500 results ===
| Year | Car | Start | Qual | Rank | Finish | Laps | Led | Retired |
|---|---|---|---|---|---|---|---|---|
| 1913 | 9 | 2 | 80.750 | 19 | 4 | 200 | 0 | Running |
| 1914 | 10 | 11 | 89.150 | 16 | 3 | 200 | 9 | Running |
| 1919 | 32 | 3 | 98.300 | 9 | 4 | 200 | 0 | Running |
| 1921 | 9 | 14 | 87.780 | 17 | 6 | 200 | 0 | Running |
| 1926 | 39 | 19 | 88.580 | 27 | 28 | 8 | 0 | Piston |
| Totals | | | | | | 808 | 9 | |

| Starts | 5 |
| Poles | 0 |
| Front Row | 2 |
| Wins | 0 |
| Top 5 | 3 |
| Top 10 | 4 |
| Retired | 1 |
