= 1911 Grand Prix season =

Grand Prix season

Seasons
- ← 1910 1912 →

The 1911 Grand Prix season consisted of Grand Prix races in the United States and Europe. It was a significant year as European racing gradually came out of the doldrums. A Grand Prix was held in France again. The first Indianapolis 500 was held at Indianapolis Motor Speedway, joining the American Grand Prize (held in Savannah, Georgia) as a leading race.

The Automobile Club de la Sarthe et de l’Ouest organized the Grand Prix de France of 1911. This race is not considered to be part of the lineage of French Grand Prix, as it was a separate event from the official French Grand Prix, the Grand Prix de l'ACF, organized by the Automobile Club de France from 1906 onwards.

== Major races ==
Date	Name	Circuit	Race Regulations	Race Distance	Winner's Time	Winning driver	Winning constructor	Report
14 May	(Italy) VI Targa Florio	Madonie	Targa Florio	450 km	9h 32m	(Italy) Ernesto Ceirano	SCAT	Report
30 May	(United States) I Indianapolis 500	Indianapolis Motor Speedway	AAA	500 miles	6h 42m	(United States) Ray Harroun	Marmon Wasp	Report
25 Jun	(France) VI Coupe des Voiturettes	Boulogne-sur-Mer	Voiturette	625 km	7h 03m	(France) Paul Bablot	Delage	Report
23 Jul	Grand Prix de France	Le Mans	Formula Libre	655 km	7h 06m	(France) Victor Hémery	Fiat	Report
14 Oct	(United States) Free-For-All Race	Santa Monica	Formula Libre	202 miles	2h 42m	(United States) Harvey Herrick	National	Report
3 Nov	(Belgium) III Coupe d’Ostende	Ostende	Voiturette	330 km	3h 52m	(France) Jules Goux	Lion-Peugeot	Report
27 Nov	(United States) VII Vanderbilt Cup	Savannah	AAA	290 miles	3h 56m	(United States) Ralph Mulford	Lozier	Report
30 Nov	(United States) III American Grand Prize	Savannah	Formula Libre	410 miles	5h 31m	(United States) David Bruce-Brown	FIAT	Report

== Season review ==
The season started with the Targa Florio with fifteen cars entered. It included cars from new Italian companies ALFA and SCAT (another company from the Ceirano family). Heavy rain beforehand had made the roads treacherous and they quickly turned to mud. Franchini, in the ALFA, led until he had to retire after the second lap from exhaustion of manhandling the big machine for six hours. In the end only five cars finished the three laps, headed by Ernesto Ceirano in his SCAT.

The Indianapolis speedway had hosted a number of races in 1910 after being repaved with bricks. But the organisers wanted something greater and had the idea of holding a single 500-mile race offering the biggest prize-money in the country. The whole month of May was allocated to testing and qualifying for the entrants. The regulations were adapted from the current AAA rules: a maximum of 600 ci (9.8-litres) and a minimum weight of 2300 lb (1044 kg). Forty qualifiers lined up at the start. Almost all the drivers ran with a riding mechanic. The only exception was Ray Harroun, who was enticed out of retirement after winning the championship the previous year. He instead fitted a rear-view mirror to his Marmon, the first driver to do such.

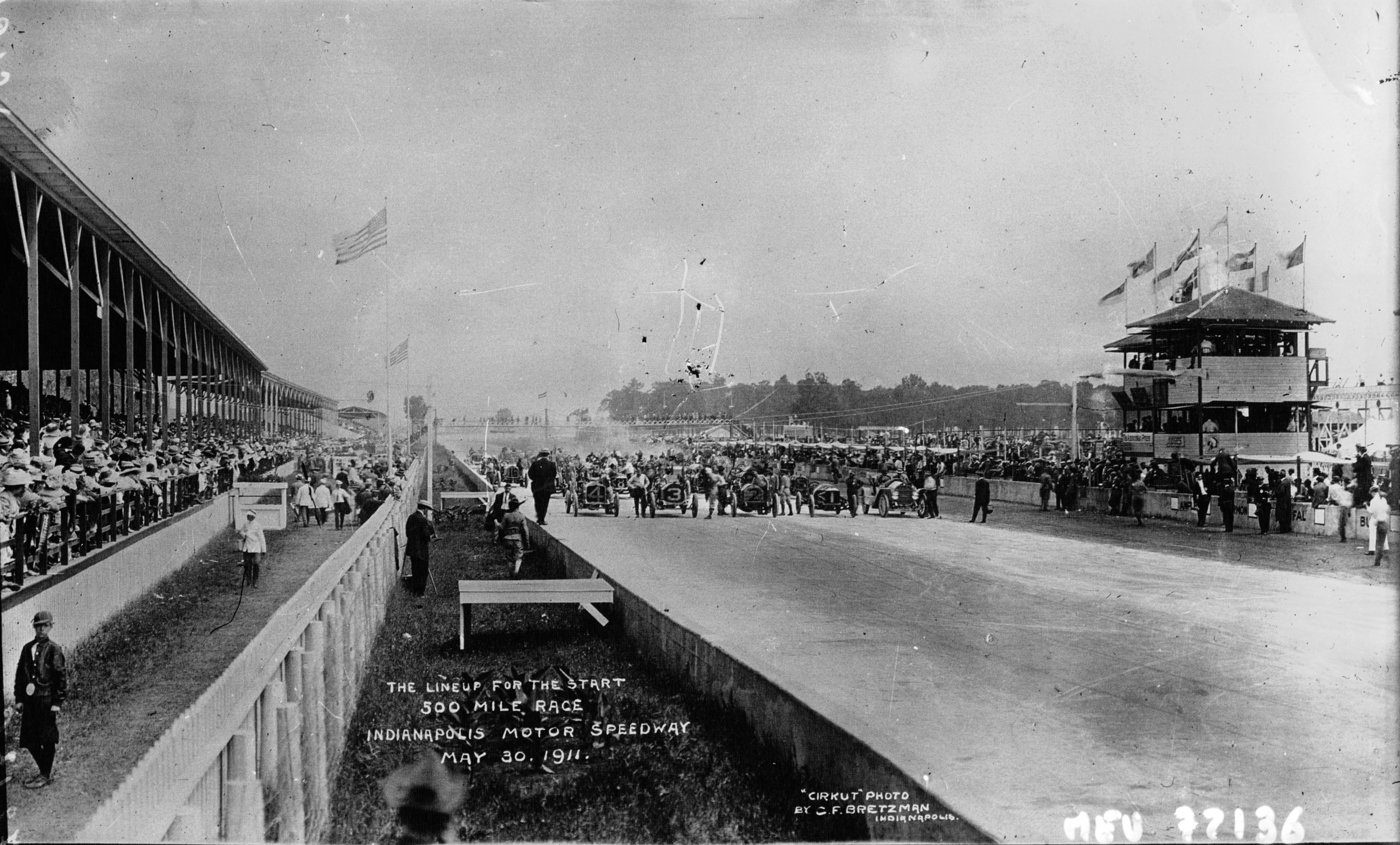
Lined up for the start of the Indianapolis 500, pacecar on the right

The race started with another first – a rolling start - and was close and full of incident. On lap 13, Arthur Greiner’s Simplex lost a wheel, spun and slammed into the wall on the back straight. Greiner was thrown out and his mechanic, Sam Dickson, hit the wall and was killed. Soon after half-way, the steering on Joe Jagersberger's Case broke. As it slowed on the front straight, his mechanic got out to try and manually steer the wheels, but was knocked over by his own car. Harry Knight just avoided him, swerving into the pitlane and crashing into Herbert Lytle’s stationary car. Amazingly, despite the mayhem, no-one was killed in the accident. Meanwhile, Harroun had been leading since the 200-mile mark, and with the assistance of a 35-lap relief drive by Cyrus Patschke, went on to win the race. Ralph Mulford in a Lozier was second, although he protested that he had not been scored a lap in the confusion during the big accident and was in fact ahead of Harroun. However this was rejected by the stewards. Third was David Bruce-Brown in one of the few European cars in the field – a 10-litre FIAT S61. However, the race had been a great success with 77000 spectators filling the stands.

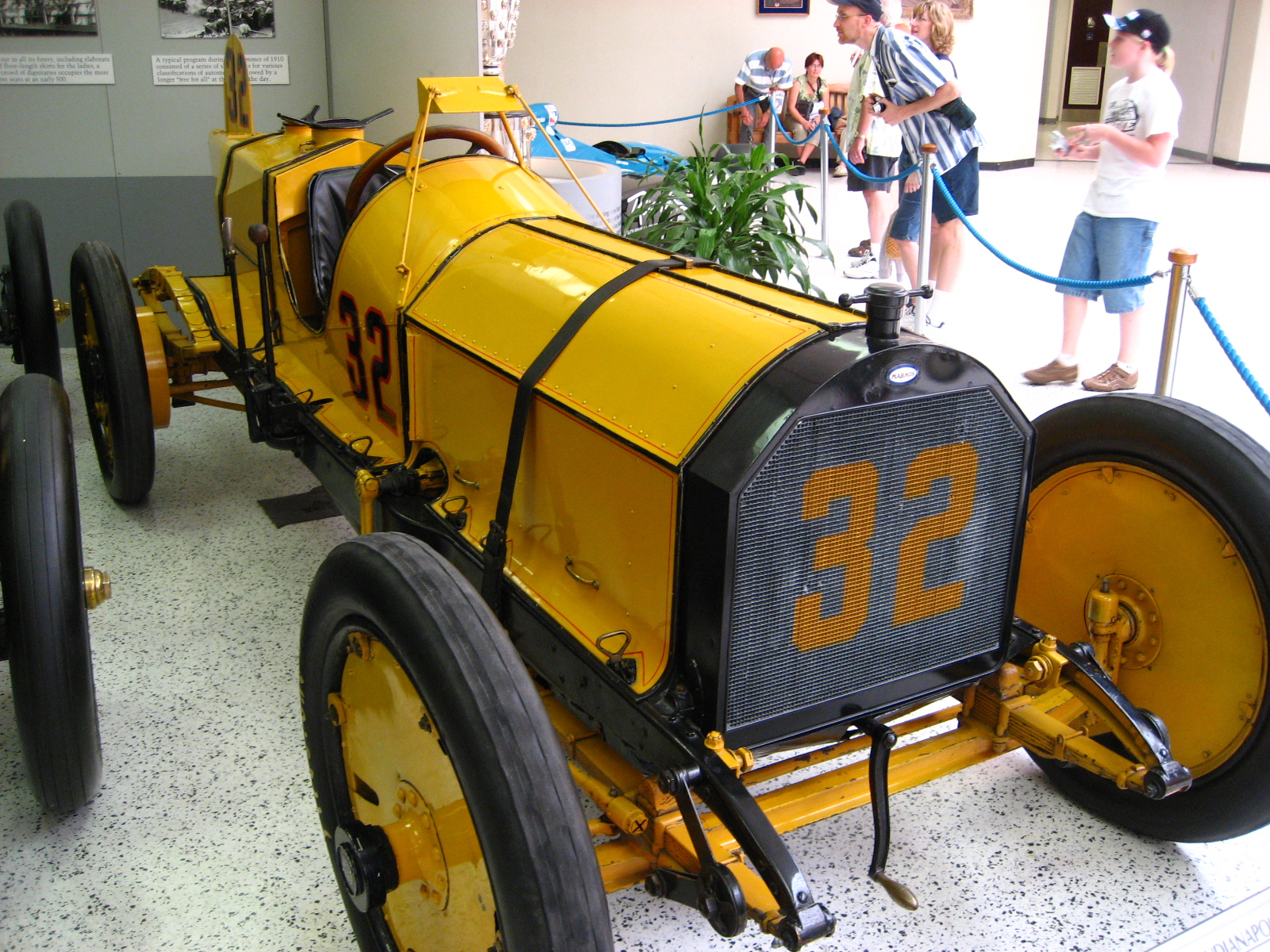
The Marmon Wasp, Indianapolis winning car, with rear-view mirror

Initial enthusiasm to revive the Grand Prix was high, but as manufacturers cancelled their entries, the French Automobile Club (ACF) had to cancel its plans. It did, however, support the AC de la Sarthe et de l’Ouest (forerunner of the Automobile Club de l'Ouest) who offered to hold an event in its stead. They had organised the original Grand Prix in 1906, outside of Le Mans. This alternative “Grand Prix de France” used a new 55km triangular circuit to the south of Le Mans. But after this race too was postponed a fortnight more entries drifted away leaving only fourteen starters, the media cynically tagged it as Grand Prix des Vieux Tacots (The Old Crocks’ Grand Prix). Only FIAT (Victor Hémery) and Rolland-Pilain (3 cars, led by Fernand Gabriel) brought works cars. Run over twelve laps (650km) Maurice Fournier (Corre La Licorne) led initially from Arthur Duray (1906 Lorraine-Dietrich) until he had to pit with over-heating to add water. He had just been overtaken by Hémery, back to third, when his front suspension collapsed when approaching Mulsanne village. The car rolled, crashed and burst into flames. Fournier was thrown out and killed instantly while Louvel, his riding mechanic, had burns and broken bones. When Duray then had gearbox problems and retired, it left Hémery an easy drive to victory (despite being stuck in top gear) after seven hours. Ernest Friderich driving the first racing Bugatti (the small 1.3-litre Type 13) finished second two laps behind and Gabriel was third, a further lap back.

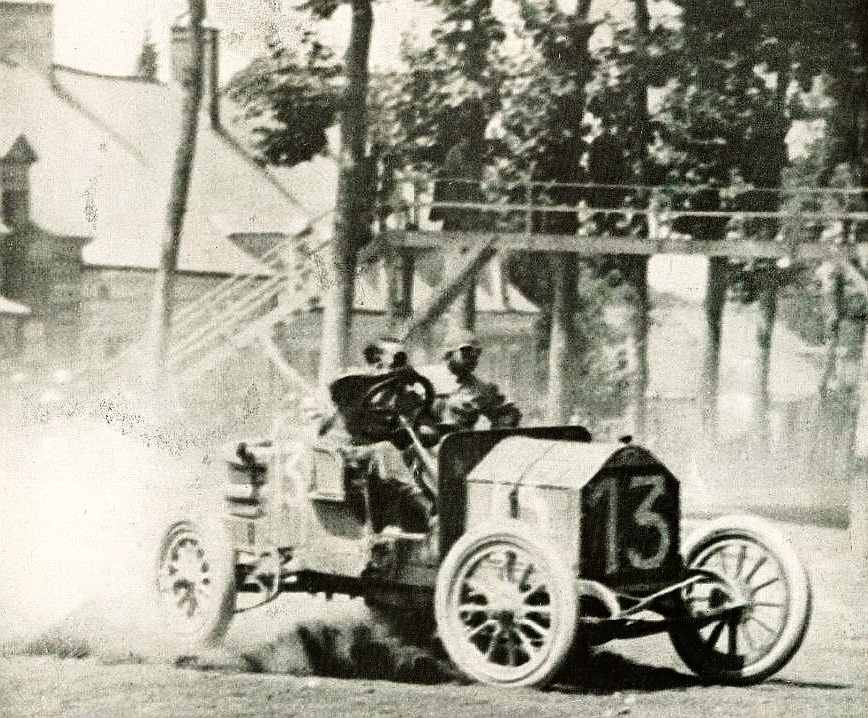
Hémery leading the GP de France

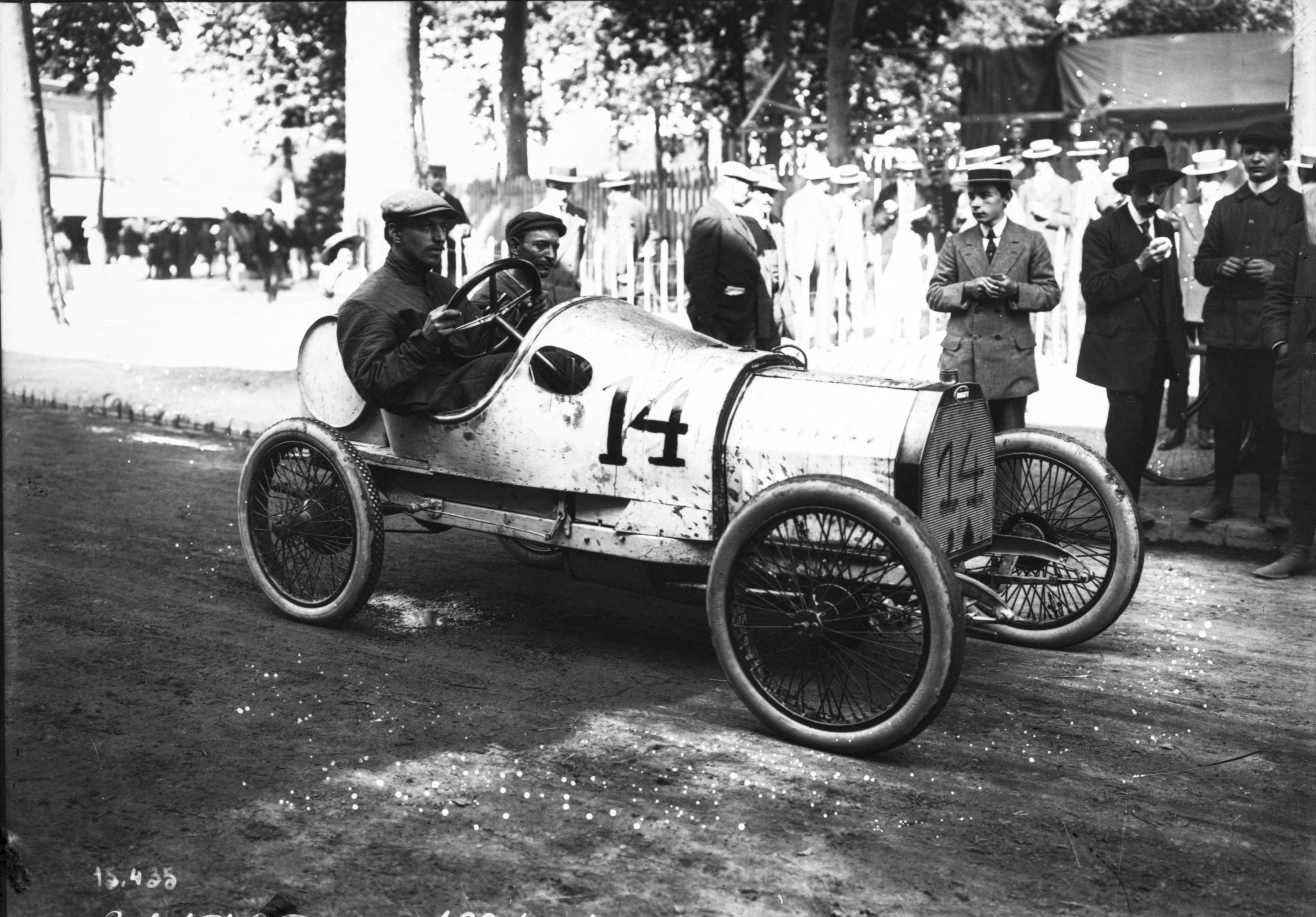
Friderich and the 2nd place Bugatti Type 13 voituerette

The voiturette class was shaken up by divergent fortunes of the two main teams: Lion-Peugeot and Hispano-Suiza. Strikes at the Barcelona factory caused friction between the Hispano-Suiza designers and the drivers. The managers decided to shut down the racing department. This left Paolo Zuccarelli without a job, until he was soon hired by Lion-Peugeot, joining Georges Boillot and Jules Goux. He filled a gap left following the death of Giosue Giuppone at the end of the last season. The squat 4-cylinder engine of the Hispano-Suiza provided far better stability than the tall 2-cylinder in the faster Peugeots, and the team to tap into Zuccarelli's ideas. The rift between Lion-Peugeot and their parent company had been mended. The three drivers were all also engineers and Goux's family had worked in Peugeot for several generations. Although the other managers called them “The Charlatans”, Robert Peugeot recognised the innovative ideas and skill the drivers could bring to racing design. He also hired Swiss Ernest Henry (formerly at Hispano-Suiza) and Italian Ettore Bugatti (just starting his own firm).

At the Coupe des Voiturettes (also called the Coupe de l’Auto, as it was promoted by L’Auto newspaper) the Lion-Peugeot team arrived in force with its new V4 VX5; the three regular drivers joined by René Hanriot. With a maximum engine size of 3-litre, ranged against the Peugeots now was a variety of manufacturers that included new models from Delage and Grégoire from France, Arrol-Johnston and Calthorpe from Great Britain. From the start, Boillot took the lead with Burgess's Calthorpe second, Goux third and then the three Delages. But when all four Peugeots had issues with engines, tyres or, in Zuccarelli's case, crashing, it allowed the Delages of Paul Bablot and René Thomas to establish a gap. Although Boillot was able to make up time and pass Thomas, it was Bablot who won giving Delage a surprise victory at first attempt over the Lion-Peugeot team.

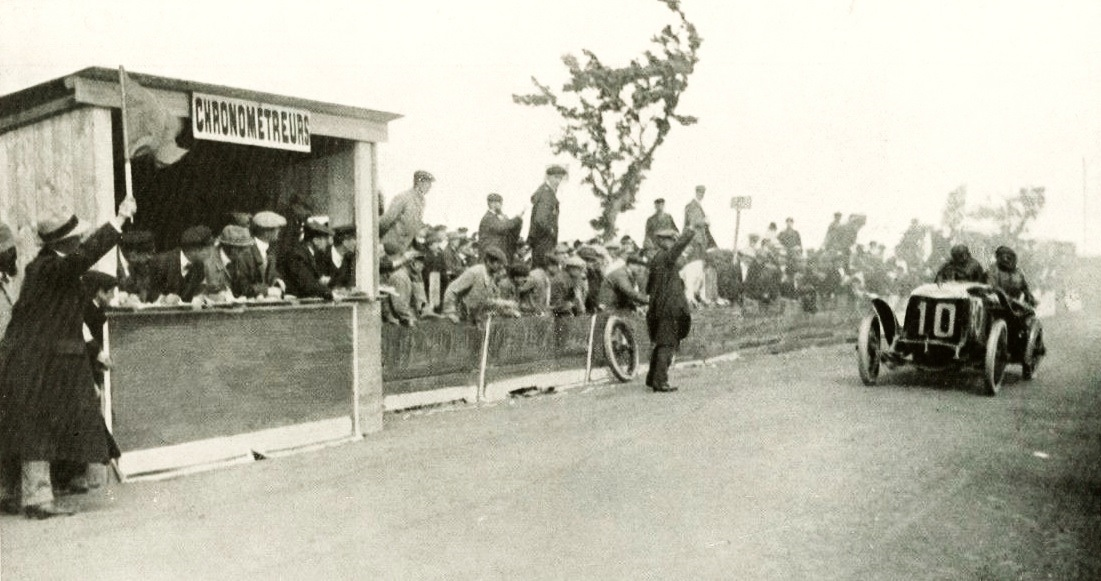
Bablot winning the Coupe des Voiturettes

Once again, the Vanderbilt Cup and American Grand Prize were to be held together. For the first time, the Vanderbilt Cup left New York and joined the Grand Prize at Savannah, Georgia. FIAT and Daimler sent cars across the Atlantic for the end-of-season races.

The Vanderbilt Cup was an all-American affair as part of the AAA championship. Ralph DePalma and Spencer Wishart drove the Mercedes, and 21-year old David Bruce-Brown led the team of three 14-litre FIAT S74s. Harry Grant had won the previous two Vanderbilts with ALCO but this year drove a new Lozier, joining Ralph Mulford. Cyrus Patschke and Bob Burman drove for Marmon. In front of a crowd of around 100,000, DePalma took the initial lead. Just like Indianapolis, tyre-wear on the American rubber at high speed was a problem and many drivers had to pit. But learning from Harroun's tactics at the 500, Mulford maintained a more even pace to protect his tyres and was able to take over the lead. DePalma and Wishart were charging hard but that meant more pit-stops for tyres, negating any gains. In the end, with fewer stops and slick pit-work from his crew, Mulford won in just under four hours, two minutes ahead of DePalma, with Wishart a further ten minutes back and Grant's Lozier in fourth. The spectators were delighted an American car had taken on and beaten the premier European cars. The FIATs were never a threat, crippled by tyre issues.

Three days later, the Grand Prize was run. A number of entrants from the earlier race returned for the longer, 400-mile, race. Several European drivers also arrived. Louis Wagner joined David Bruce-Brown and Caleb Bragg with FIAT. Benz brought three cars, for Victor Hémery, Eddie Hearne and Erwin Bergdoll. At the beginning, Bragg led the sixteen starters but a close race saw this contested as Bruce-Brown, Hémery and Patschke's Marmon also vied for the lead. This time round, the FIATs tyres were far better and David Bruce-Brown claimed the victory with the Benz of Hearne in second, two minutes back, with DePalma's Mercedes just a minute behind. At the end of the year Ralph Mulford was acclaimed as the AAA national driving champion.

In January, the first Monte Carlo Rally was held. Entrants started from various European capitals all driving through rough winter weather to meet in the mountains by Monaco. In response to the 21-litre Blitzen Benz, Fiat built the enormous S76, with a 28.4-litre engine generating 290 bhp. Pietro Bordino took the second prototype to do a Land Speed Record attempt at Brooklands, but it proved too unstable for the circuit. Taking it to the Saltburn Sands he broke 200 km/h (120 mph). Later, in December 1913, Arthur Duray reached 213.0 km/h (132.4 mph) at Ostend in the same vehicle.

Citations
