= 1909 Grand Prix season =

Fourth Grand Prix racing season

Seasons
- ← 1908 1910 →

The 1909 Grand Prix season was the fourth Grand Prix racing season. There were no Grandes Épreuves that year, as the economic recession of the previous year continued on. Renault had withdrawn from motor-racing and a number of French manufacturers, falling behind the success of their German and Italian rivals, followed suit. The French Grand Prix was cancelled, leaving the Targa Florio in Italy and Vanderbilt Cup in the United States as the only major races this season. With so little competition and financial incentive, technological advances ground to a halt. Emphasis shifted from racing to setting speed and endurance records. Benz & Cie built a new 12.4-litre racing-engine, and its 200 bhp derivative was put into the Blitzen Benz. This 21.5-litre monster held the Land speed record from 1909 to 1922, with various drivers starting with Victor Hémery in November 1909 at Brooklands.

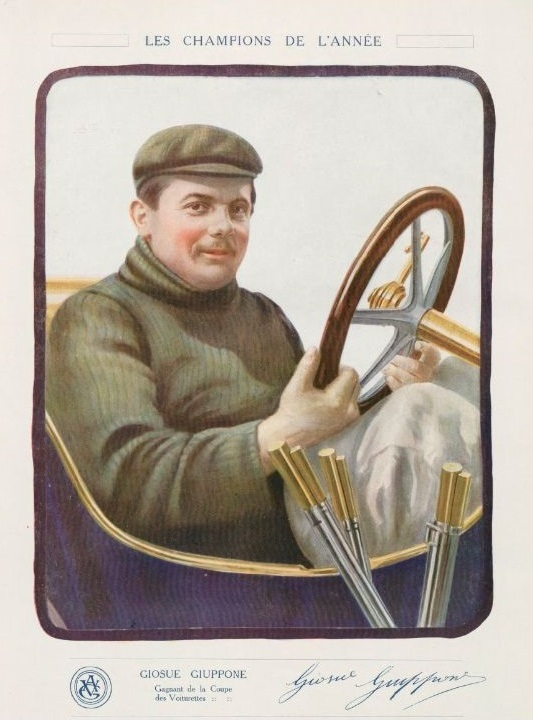
Giosuè Giuppone, pre-eminent driver of 1909

== Major races ==
Date	Name	Circuit	Race Regulations	Race Distance	Winner's Time	Winning driver	Winning constructor	Report
26 Apr	(Italy) III Corsa Vetturette Madonie	Madonie	Voiturette	300 km	6h 48m	(France) Jules Goux	Lion-Peugeot	Report
2 May	(Italy) IV Targa Florio	Madonie	Formula Libre	150 km	2h 43m	(Italy) Francesco Ciuppa	S.P.A.	Report
20 May	(Spain) II Copa Catalunya	Sitges	Voiturette	360 km	6h 18m	(France) Jules Goux	Lion-Peugeot	Report
20 Jun	(France) IV Coupe des Voiturettes	Boulogne-sur-Mer	Voiturette	450 km	5h 56m	(Italy) Giosue Giuppone	Lion-Peugeot	Report
1 Jul	(Italy) III Circuito Siciliano Vetturette	Favorita Park, Palermo	Voiturette	150 km	3h 10m	(Italy) Vincenzo Florio	De Dion-Bouton	Report
29 Aug	(France) II Coupe de Normandie	Caen	Voiturette	330 km	3h 11m	(France) Georges Boillot	Lion-Peugeot	Report
14 Sep	(Belgium) I Coupe d’Ostende	Ostende	Voiturette	400 km	4h 33m	(Italy) Giosue Giuppone	Lion-Peugeot	Report
24 October	(United States) V Vanderbilt Cup	Long Island Motor Parkway	AAA	280 miles	4h 25m	(United States) Harry Grant	ALCO-Berliet	Report

== Racing regulations ==
The AIACR (forerunner of the FIA) had modified its racing regulations for the 1909 season. A car's minimum dry weight was reduced from 1100 kg down to 900 kg. Bore limits were also changed: for 4-cylinder cars it became 130 mm (was 155 mm) and 106 mm for 6-cylinder cars (from 127 mm). However, as manufacturers boycotted Grand Prix racing, the regulations were never enforced. The French Grand Prix had to be cancelled and instead a Formula Libre (literally 'free formula', or open rules) was used for the few events that were held for the larger racing cars.

Despite the economic restrictions, the voiturette class for smaller cars did continue to thrive. For the voiturettes, the bore limitations were 65 mm (4-cyl), 80 mm (2-cyl) and 100 mm (1-cyl) respectively. But with no limitation on the stroke length it led to rather strange chassis shapes: metre-tall cylinders in line in a narrow engine case, necessitating the drivers to peer around the side of the engine when racing.

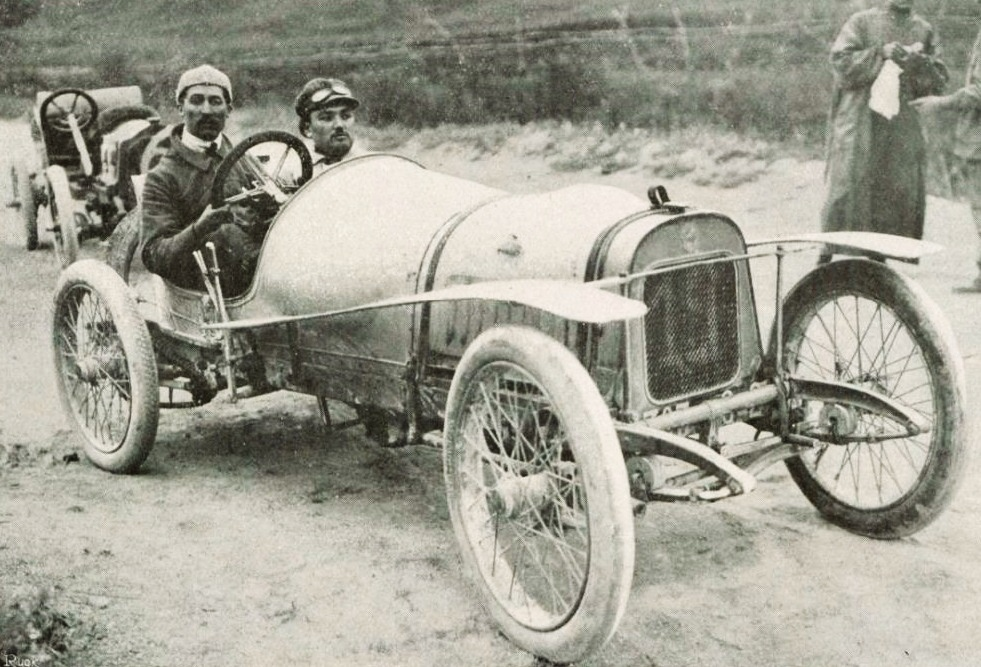
Jules Goux, winner of the Corsa Vetturette Madonie

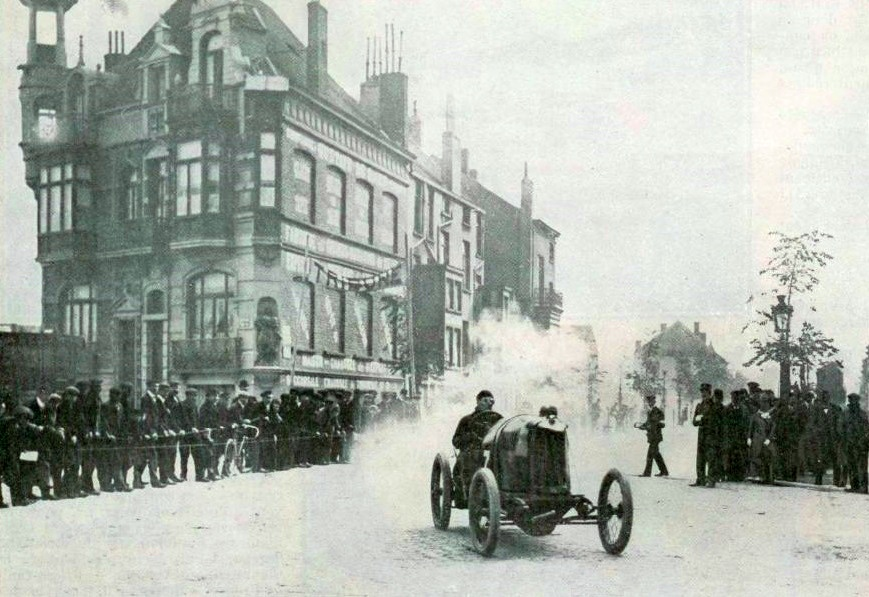
Giosuè Giuppone winning the Coupe d’Ostende

== Season review ==
The abbreviated season started in Sicily firstly with the Madonie Voiturette race, and then the Targa Florio - this year held to a free formula. Just four months earlier, in December 1908, a catastrophic earthquake (the largest in recent European history) had virtually destroyed the city of Messina and killed over 100000 people. To keep a tradition going, the two races were still held. But in consequence, the junior race only had six entrants: three works-team Lion-Peugeots versus three privateer De Dion-Boutons. The Targa itself was only held over a single lap of the Madonie course. Eleven cars entered and the race was won by Barone Francesco Ciuppa in a SPA (another Ceirano family offshoot), finishing just a minute ahead of the young race organiser Conde Vincenzo Florio in a FIAT, with Guido Airoldi a further ten minutes back in third. Airoldi was driving a Lancia – a new car built by former FIAT-team driver Vincenzo Lancia.

Over the season the trio of Lion-Peugeot works drivers dominated the podiums winning five of the six voiturette races. Jules Goux opened with the wins in Sicily and Catalonia, Georges Boillot won his first in Caen, while Giosué Giuppone had victory at the Coupe de l’Auto and the inaugural Ostend Cup in Belgium. The only gap was the minor event run by Vincenzo Florio at Palermo, won by Florio himself in a De Dion-Bouton, but as there were only three De Dions entered, it was not a contest.

In May, the voiturettes held the first significant motor-race in Spain – the Copa de Cataluña – at the Sitges circuit near Barcelona. This auspicious event was attended by the young Spanish King Alfonso XIII. The three Lion-Peugeots were challenged by Georges Sizaire. Dominant the previous year, the Sizaire-Naudin company was struggling in the recession and this was their sole outing in 1909. Local interest was in a trio of locally manufactured Hispano-Suiza 4-cylinder cars, led by Paolo Zuccarelli. Goux and Boillot initially took the lead, but the crowd was thrilled when Zuccarelli overtook them and led for several laps until his clutch broke. When Boillot and another Hispano both rolled and Sizaire was delayed with a broken wheel, it left Goux with an easy win, by an hour, from Sizaire.

In lieu of the cancelled French Grand Prix, the Coupe des Voiturettes (promoted by L’Auto newspaper), held at Boulogne was the main race in France. Goux arrived with a new twin-cylinder version, while his team-mates stayed on their single-cylinder Lion-Peugeots. Zuccarelli returned with the Hispano-Suiza team. Once again, he challenged and led early on, but the Spanish cars faded and when Boillot lost 20 minutes changing spark-plugs, Guippone had a comfortable victory from Goux.

1907 had seen the opening of the first purpose-built racetrack at Brooklands, England. This year a consortium of Indiana businessmen headed by Carl G. Fisher started building a new 2.5-mile rectangular track at Indianapolis. In a three-day opening meeting, the first race (a 2-lap 5-mile sprint) was held on 19 August. However, the new surface of crushed gravel and asphalt broke up causing several major crashes, killing five people. The owners set about repaving the track with 3.2 million bricks before the 1910 season, earning its famous nickname: "The Brickyard".

The AAA (Automobile Association of America) changed its regulations for the Vanderbilt Cup race. It was now open to stock production cars of 300-600ci (4.9-9.8 litres) This removed the interest of the European manufacturers, as did the costs getting to the US in hard economic times. Thus the race became a national event; won by Harry Grant in an ALCO-Berliet. His steady-speed race strategy succeeded after Billy Knipper in his Chalmers had bolted from the start, only to retire with oil-pressure problems with three laps to go. In 1926 the race was retrospectively added to the AAA National Championship
