= Lydston Hornsted =

British holder of the World Land speed record

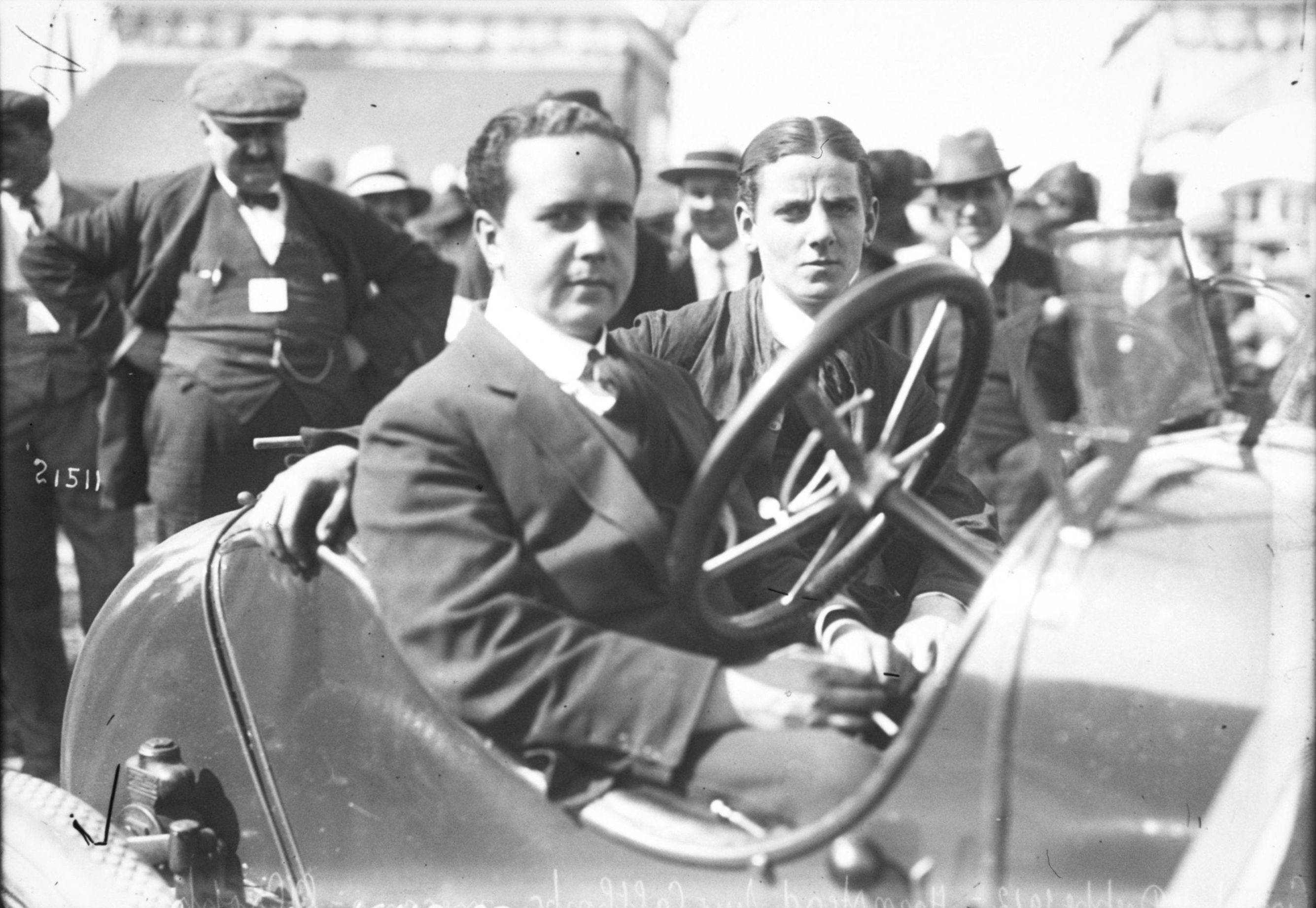
Hornsted in his Calthorpe at the 1912 French Grand Prix at Dieppe.

Lydston Hornsted, (Lydston Granville Hornsted), L.G. Hornsted, Cupid, (1883–1957), was the first British holder of the World Land speed record, which he achieved on 24 June 1914 with an official speed of 124 miles per hour at the Brooklands motor racing circuit. His record stood for almost eight years until 17 May, 1922.

== Personal life ==
Hornsted was the son of Nicholas William Hornsted, the British Consul to Moscow.

He married four times: first in 1907 to Isabella Reilly Marston in Hampstead, London, but divorced in 1913; second to Olive May Allsopp on 1 July 1915 in Camden, London; third to Alice M. Reynolds in Hampstead, London, in 1919; fourth to Joyce M. Williams in Chelsea, London, during 1937, sister of stage, film and television actor John Williams.

== Land speed record ==
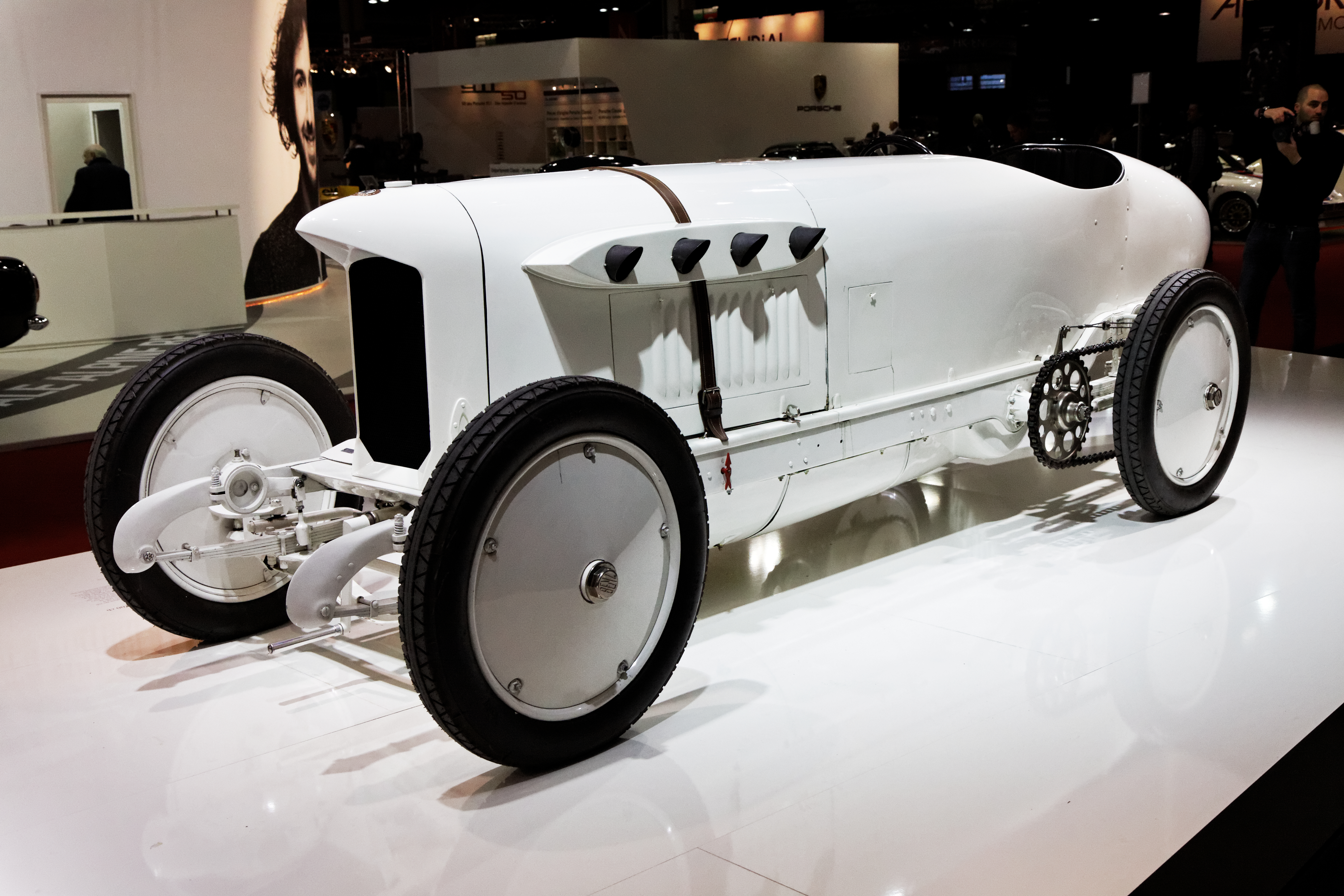
A Blitzen-Benz of 1909.

The World Land speed record had been contested by French, Belgian and American drivers since 18 December 1898, and had changed hands nineteen times when Hornsted made his successful attempt to become the first British holder. At the Brooklands race track on 24 June 1914, he drove his 200 hp Blitzen Benz No 3 for two runs of 1 mile each, to average 124.09 mph, (199.70 km/h). This was first 2-way record set under new regulations of the Association International des Automobile Clubs Reconnus (AIACR).

The Blitzen Benz No 3 produced 200 hp from its 21.5 L (1,310 cu in) inline-4 cylinder Benz engine.

== Military service ==
Hornsted joined the British Army, (Army Service Corps) on 29 August 1914, as a Second Lieutenant. He became a Lieutenant on 1 August 1915, and a Temporary Captain in 1918.

== Death ==
Hornsted died in Plymouth, Devon, in 1957.
