= Société des Automobiles Pilain =

SAP (Société des Automobiles Pilain) (Pilain)
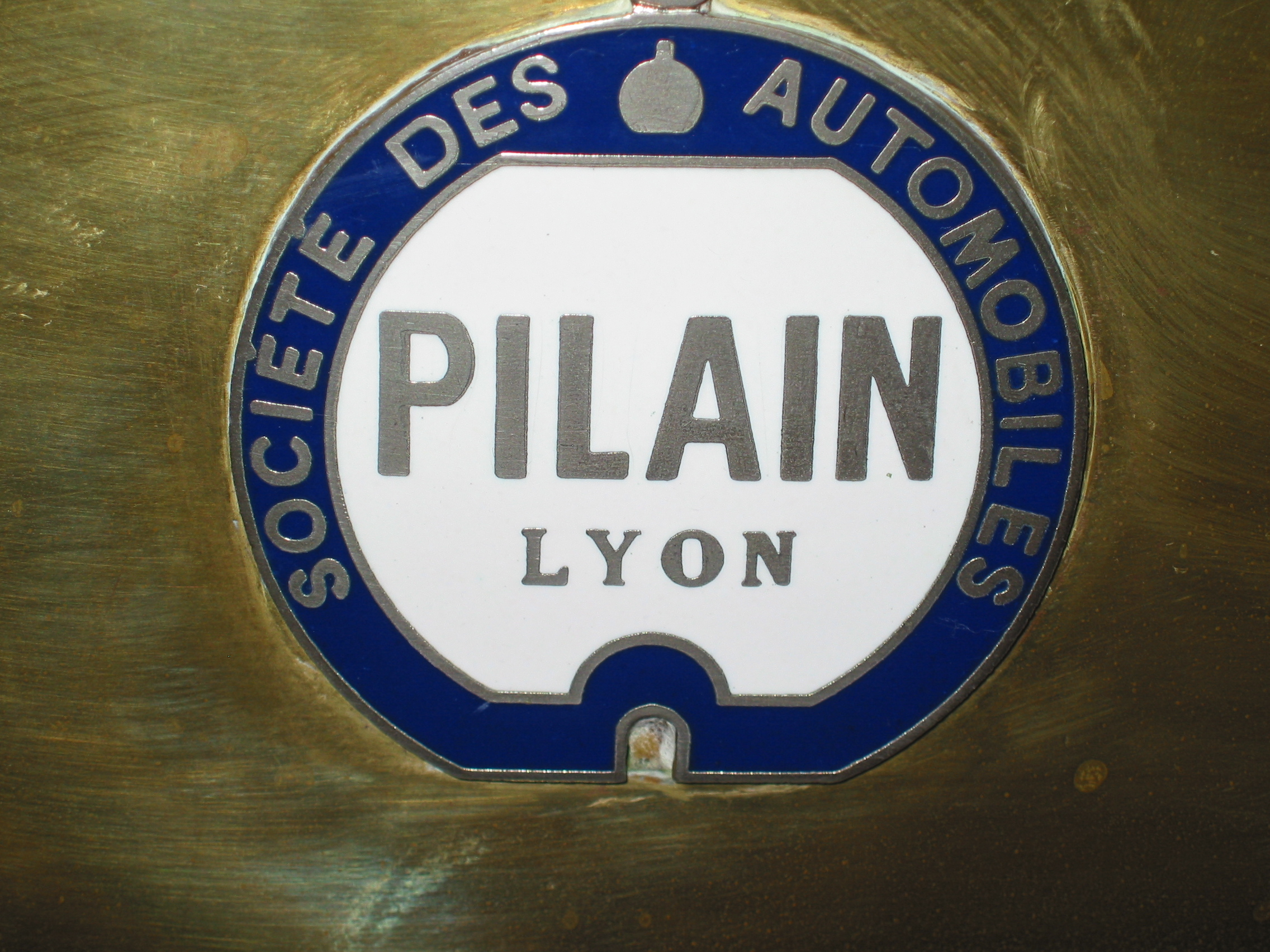
- Industry: Automotive
- Founded: 1902
- Founder: François Pilain (1859–1924)
- Defunct: 1920
- Headquarters: Lyon, France

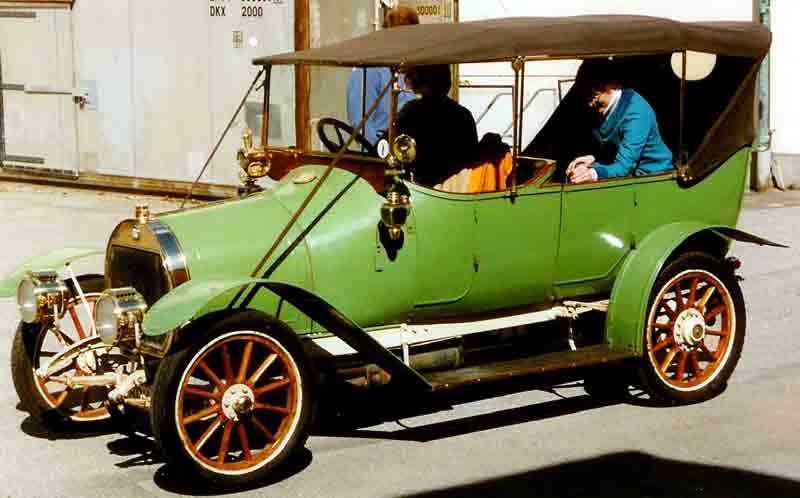
Pilain (1911)

Société des Automobiles Pilain (SAP) was an automobile manufacturer based in Lyon between 1902 and 1920.

The SAP founder, François Pilain, had a nephew called Émile Pilain whom he trained in the automotive business and whose own company, Rolland-Pilain, presented its first car in 1907. François Pilain was based in the auto-making hub that grew up around Lyon, however, while his nephew's business was based in Tours, more than 500 kilometers (310 miles) to the west. Sources sometimes confuse the two companies, but in fact there was no link or collaboration between them, once the nephew had grown up and established his own company.

== History ==
François Pilain (1859–1924) had a long career as an engineer-entrepreneur in and around the auto-business, working at different times with Gardner-Serpollet and La Buire. Between 1893 and 1897 he ran his own company, Société François Pilain, after which he worked for Établissements V. Vermorel.

In 1901 François Pilain established his own business, as an automobile manufacturer, in Lyon. The cars were sold under the Pilain name, During 1906/1907 motor car chassis were being produced at the rate of approximately one per day. However, in 1908 SAP was placed in liquidation. It was permitted to continue in the auto-making business, but Pilain himself was obliged to resign, to be replaced by a new managing director called de Villeneuve.

During the First World War the manufacturer assembled trucks for Hotchkiss. Afterwards, in 1920, it was taken over by a locally based recently created company called the Société Lyonnaise de l’Industrie Mécanique et Autos Pilain (“SLIM”). Between 1920 and 1929 the factory produced cars using the “SLIM” badge.

== The cars ==
SAP started out producing both twin cylinder engine cars and four cylinder cars, but production of the twin cylinder cars ended in 1904.

In 1906 the manufacturer was offering cars with engines of 4000cc and 8600cc. These were joined in 1909 by a 1900cc model, and in 1912 a six-cylinder 2400cc model was added. By 1913 the Société des Automobiles Pilain was offering a broad range of cars with engine sizes from 1000 cm³ to 6300 cm³. The cars were meticulously constructed and therefore very expensive.

A car of this type can today (2010) be seen at the Musée Henri Malartre in south-eastern France at Rochetaillée-sur-Saône.

== Reference, sources and notes ==
- Harald Linz, Halwart Schrader: Die Internationale Automobil-Enzyklopädie. United Soft Media Verlag, München 2008, ISBN 978-3-8032-9876-8. (in German)
- George Nick Georgano (Chefredakteur): The Beaulieu Encyclopedia of the Automobile. Volume 3: P–Z. Fitzroy Dearborn Publishers, Chicago 2001, ISBN 1-57958-293-1. (in English)
- George Nick Georgano: Autos. Encyclopédie complète. 1885 à nos jours. Courtille, Paris 1975. (in French)
