= Peugeot EX3 =

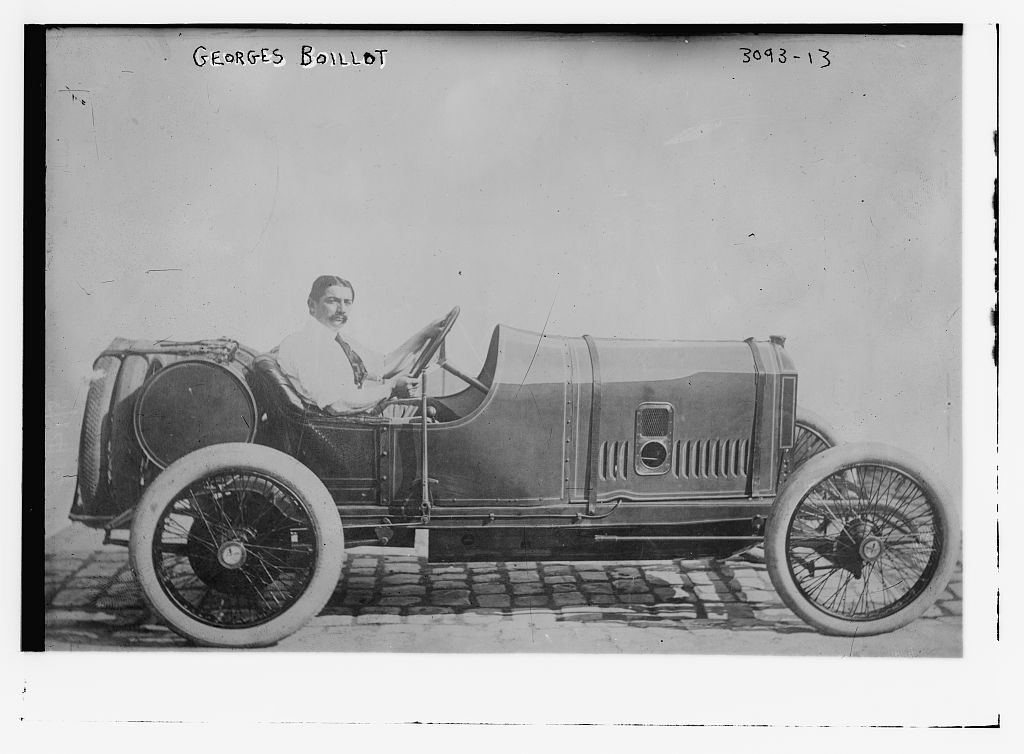
Georges Boillot in his EX3

The Peugeot EX3 was a Peugeot race car c. 1912–1914 with a four-cylinder engine. The car, driven by Dario Resta, won the 1915 Vanderbilt Cup in San Francisco, California and the United States Grand Prix.
