= Vadelaincourt =

- Commune
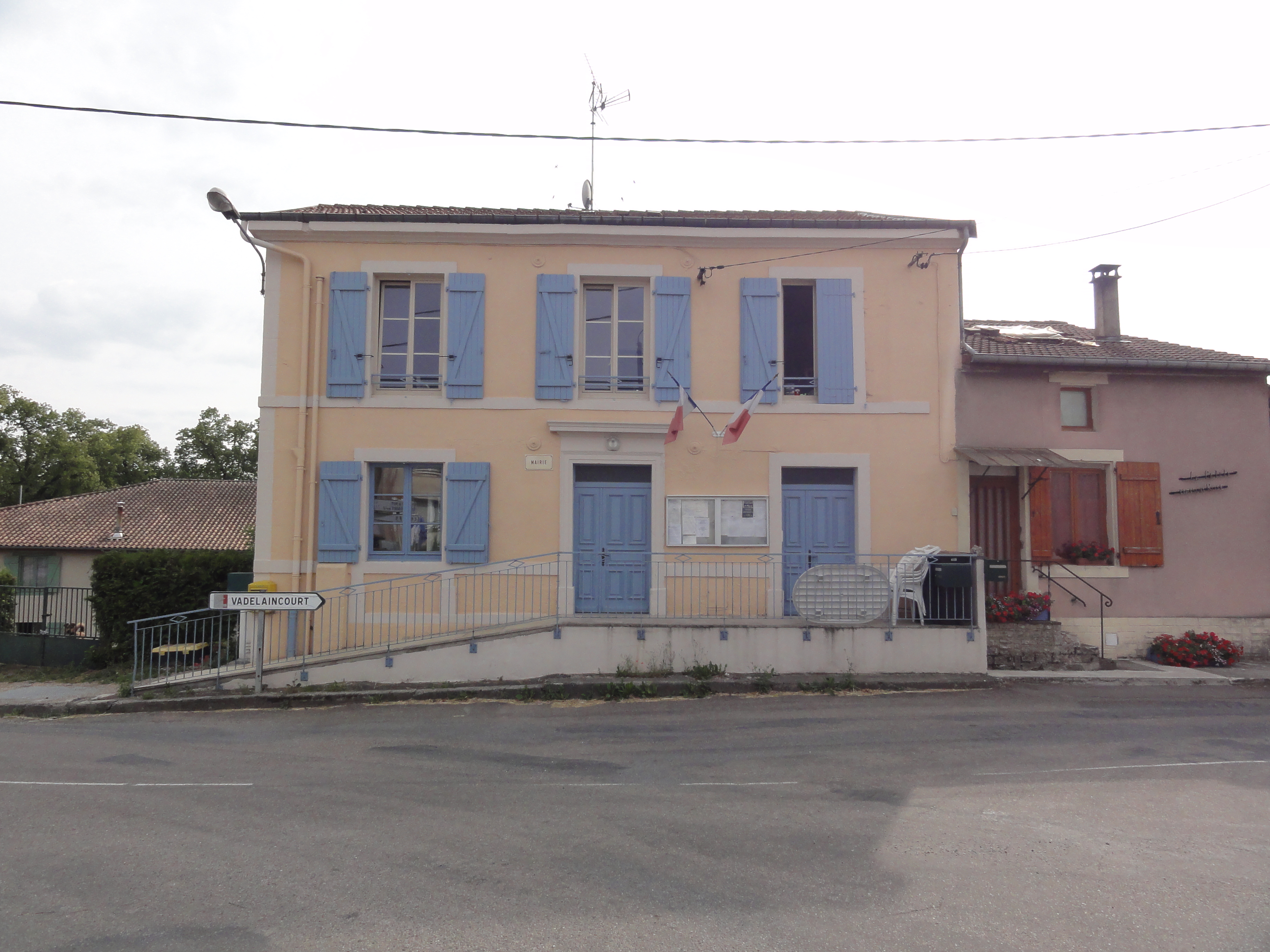
- The town hall in Vadelaincourt
- Location of Vadelaincourt
- Location within France Location within Grand Est
- Coordinates: 49°04′20″N 5°15′52″E
- Country: France
- Region: Grand Est
- Department: Meuse
- Arrondissement: Verdun
- Canton: Dieue-sur-Meuse
- Intercommunality: Val de Meuse - Voie Sacrée

Government
  - Mayor (2020–2026): Hubert Bry
- Area^{1}: 5.44 km^{2} (2.10 sq mi)
- Elevation: 290 m (950 ft)
- Highest elevation: 325 m (1,066 ft)
- Lowest elevation: 248 m (814 ft)
- Population (2023): 74
  - Density: 14/km^{2} (35/sq mi)
- Time zone: UTC+01:00 (CET)
  - Summer (DST): UTC+02:00 (CEST)
- INSEE/Postal code: 55525 /55220
- ^{1} French Land Register data, which excludes lakes, ponds, glaciers > 1 km^{2} (0.386 sq mi or 247 acres) and river estuaries.

Vadelaincourt (French pronunciation: [vadlɛ̃kuʁ]) is a commune in the Meuse department in Grand Est in north-eastern France.

== See also ==
- Communes of the Meuse department
