= Rolland-Pilain =

French car maker company

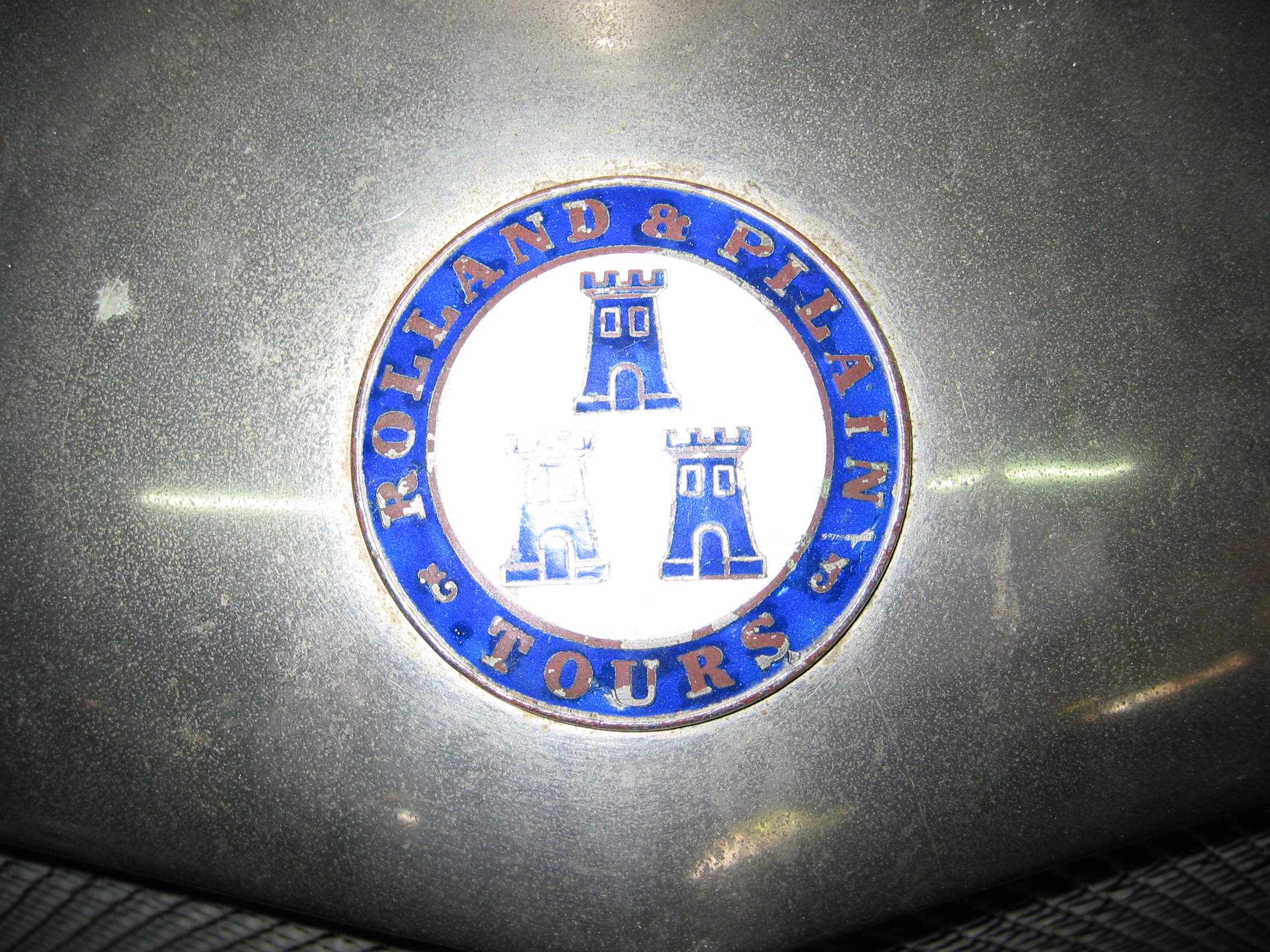

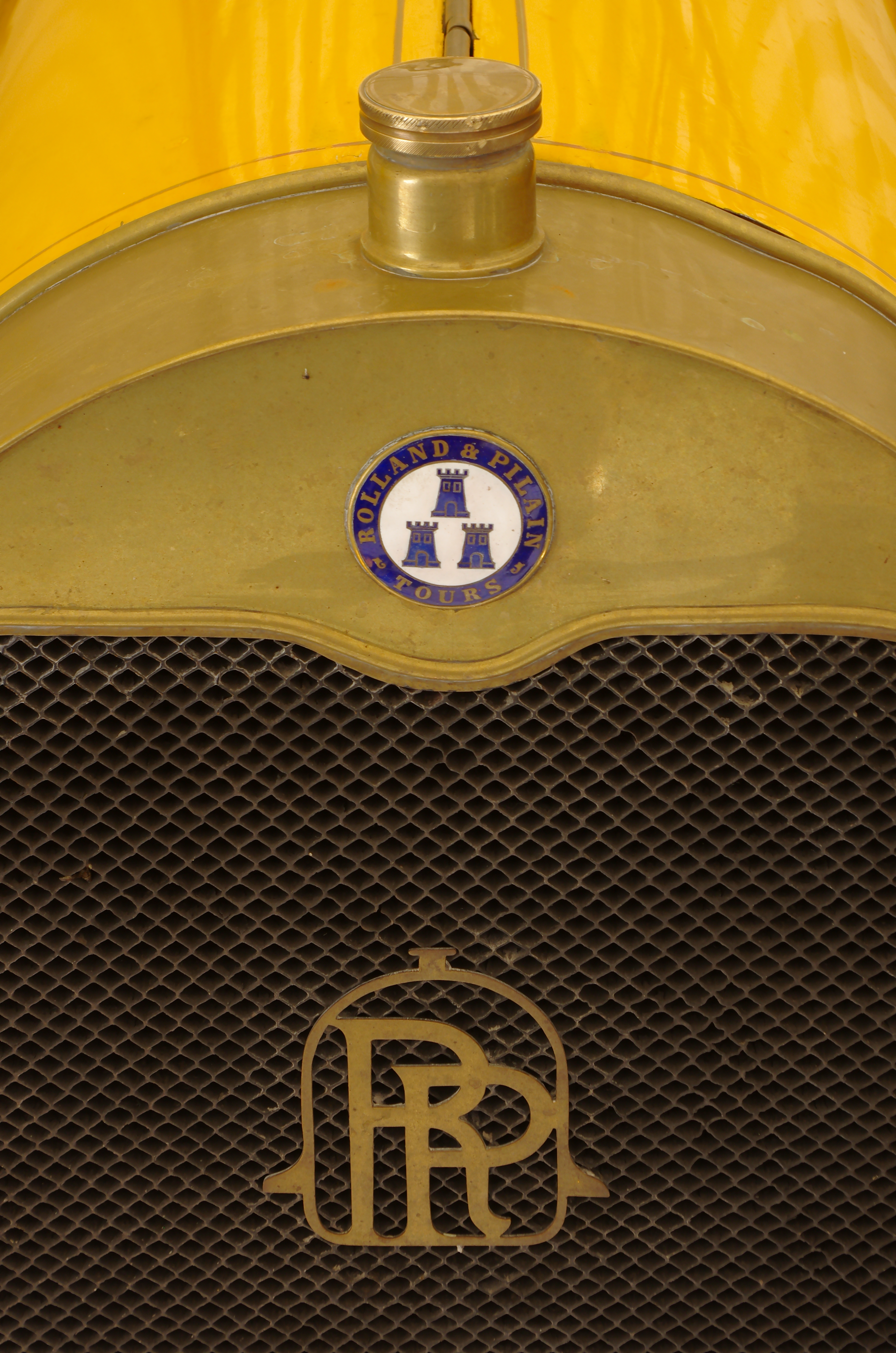
- Industry: Automotive
- Founded: 1905
- Defunct: 1932
- Fate: ceased production
- Headquarters: Tours, France
- Key people: François Rolland and Emile Pilain, founders
- Products: Automobiles

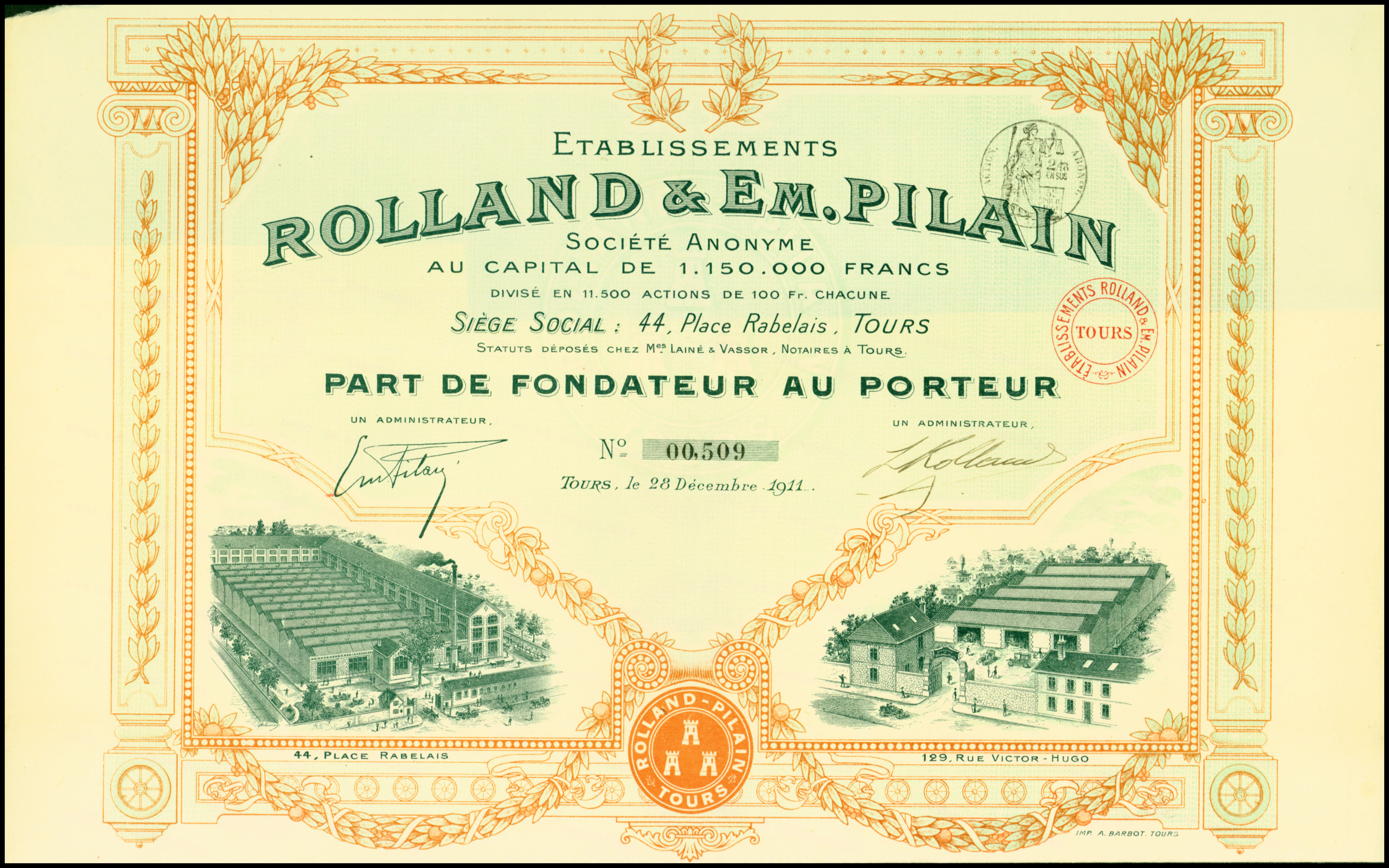
Part de Fondateur of the Etabl. Rolland & Em. Pilain S.A., issued 28. December 1911

Rolland-Pilain was a French car maker formally established on 4 November 1905 at 95, rue Victor-Hugo in Tours by François Rolland and Émile Pilain.

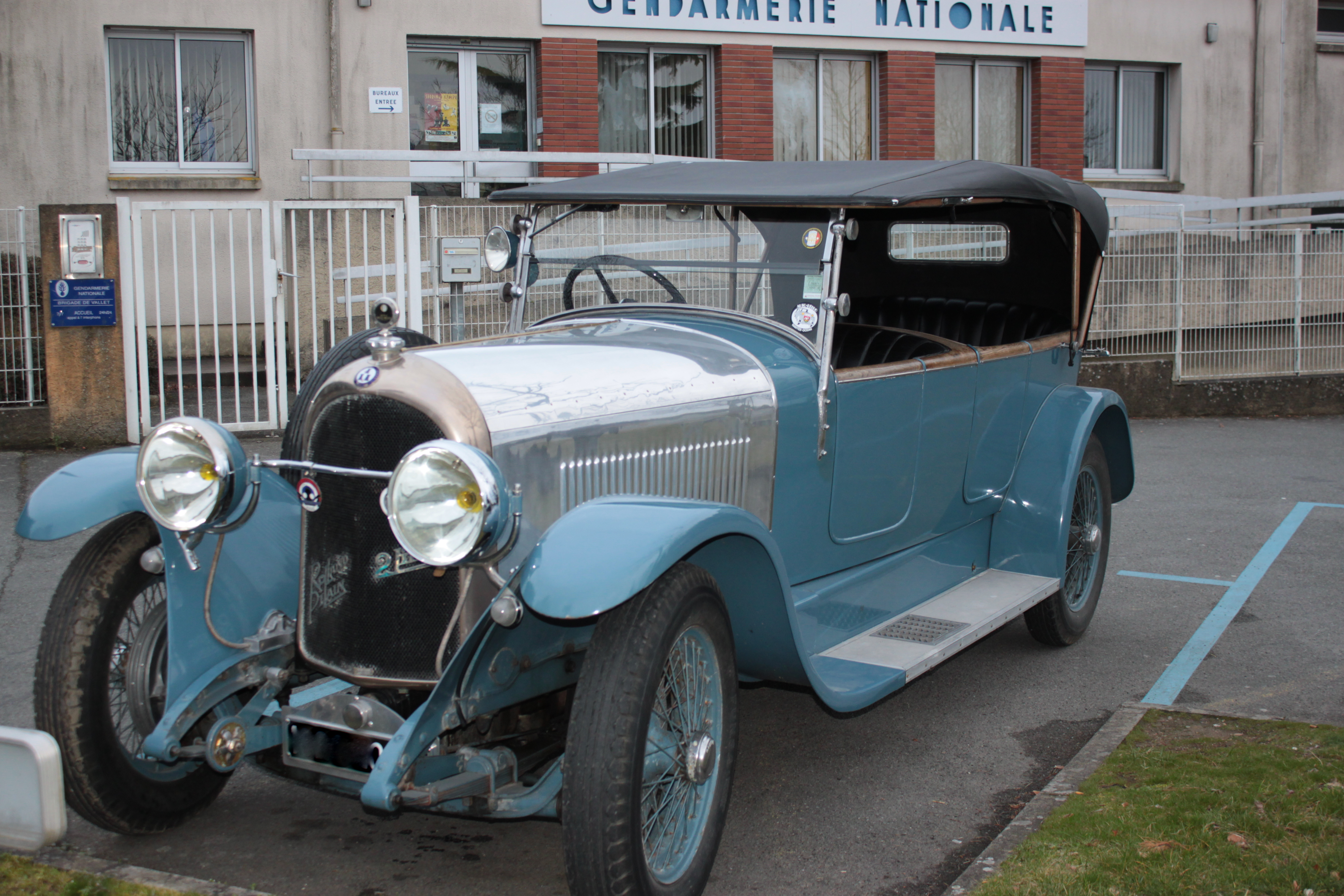
Rolland-Pilain 2-litre

== History ==
Rolland was already a successful businessman locally who had made a fortune in the wine business. Émile Pilain had a more technical background, having been trained by his uncle, François Pilain, who had relocated to Lyon and himself established the Société des Automobiles Pilain (SAP). Emile, the nephew, had remained in the Tours area, however. (Note: The two Pilain automobile manufacturers are sometimes confused with one another: there is, however, nothing in common between the uncle's business Société des Automobiles Pilain (SAP) and the nephew's business apart from the name "Pilain".)

=== Building the business ===
The partners started by repairing and selling motor vehicle, before they started producing their own cars, which appeared only in 1907.

In 1911 the business relocated to 44, place Rabelais, still in Tours, and the company became a Société anonyme (effectively a limited liability company). The company would retain this status until the money ran out, in 1925.

=== Production ===
The Rolland-Pilain cars pioneered many innovative solutions despite very limited financial resources. One such feature was hydraulic brakes. The models ranged from family cars to sports and luxury cars.

== Effects from World War II ==
During World War I Rolland-Pilain produced shells and parts for aircraft engines using a female work force. The war also saw the successful Gnome et Rhône aero-engine manufacturer relocating production outside Paris, and one of their new manufacturing bases was established in Tours. At the end of the war, in 1918, Gnome et Rhône invested in the Rolland-Pilain business, taking a majority share in it, but they disposed of their holding in 1920. By this much of the management was passing from François Rolland to his son Lucien Rolland, but Émile Pilain sustained his own involvement, while his elder brother, Léon Pilain, who had previously worked in Paris for Delahaye was also now playing an increasingly important part in the business.

== Postwar cars ==
=== 1920 models ===
At the Motor Show in October 1919 the manufacturer exhibited three cars.

- The Rolland-Pilain "Type RP 10HP" came with a four cylinder engine of 1924cc and a 2,820 mm (111.0 in) wheelbase.
  Manufacturer's list price 13,500 francs (1919)
- The Rolland-Pilain "Type M6 14HP" was offered a six cylinder engine of 2770cc and a 3,120 mm (122.8 in) wheelbase.
  Manufacturer's list price 18,500 francs (1919)
- The Rolland-Pilain "Type CR 18HP" featured a large four cylinder engine of 3969cc and a 3,120 mm (122.8 in) wheelbase.
  Manufacturer's list price 23,000 francs (1919)

The six cylinder car never made it to "volume" production, but both the four cylinder cars would enjoy some success. Prices were listed at the Motor Show for the cars in bare chassis form and included lighting, but they did not include the tyres.

=== 1925 models ===
Five years later there was no sign of a six-cylinder model, but version of both the four cylinder engines appeared at the Motor Show in October 1924, where the manufacturer exhibited four cars.

- The Rolland-Pilain "Type RP 10HP" came with a four cylinder side-valve engine of 1924cc and a 3,000 mm (118.1 in) wheelbase.
  Manufacturer's list price 24,000 francs (1924)
- The Rolland-Pilain "Type B25 10/25HP" was offered with a four cylinder overhead valve engine of 1924cc and a 3,040 mm (119.7 in) wheelbase.
  Manufacturer's list price 27,300 francs (1924)
- The Rolland-Pilain "Type C23 (sometimes called simply the " Rolland-Pilain 2-litre")" featured a four cylinder overhead camshaft engine of 2008cc and a 3,200 mm (126.0 in) wheelbase. Launched more recently, in 1923, this model was the manufacturer's most high profile model during the 1920s. It was relatively advanced technically, but also expensive to produce which was reflected in a high selling price.
  Manufacturer's list price 39,500 francs (1924)
- The Rolland-Pilain "Type CRK 18HP" featured a large four cylinder engine, now with overhead valves, of 3969cc and a 3,250 mm (128.0 in) wheelbase. Now nearing the end of its time, this was now seen as a "run-out" model
  Manufacturer's list price 24,000 francs (1924)

Prices were listed at the Motor Show for the cars in bare chassis form and included lighting, but they still did not include the tyres.

== Motorsports ==
Participation in motor racing included several Grand Prix races and Le Mans 24 hours.

The greatest success came in 1923, when Albert Guyot drove a Rolland-Pilain A22 to victory in the San Sebastián Grand Prix.

Rolland-Pilain returned to Le Mans in 1924 and again in 1925, entering 3 Torpedo bodied cars, their engine sizes restricted to 1,997cc. Only one of the three finished, driven by Jean de Marguenat and Louis Sire, and achieving seventh place.

French auto-makers set great store by endurance events in Africa during the 1920s, and the company received much positive publicity from the "Tranin-Duverne" marathon drive undertaken from Conakry to Djibouti using a 10HP Rolland-Pilain. The exploit lasted from 3 December 1924 to 20 February 1925. This was the first time a wheeled car had traversed the African continent from west to east.

== Demise ==
A lack of funds led to Rolland and Pilain losing control of the company in 1926. Things went downhill from there. Automobile production ended in 1927 and the company was declared in default of its debts in 1928. After a period of struggle, the factory closed in 1932.

When production ceased, more than 5,000 cars had been built.
