= Georges Boillot =

French racing driver and World War I fighter pilot (1884–1916)

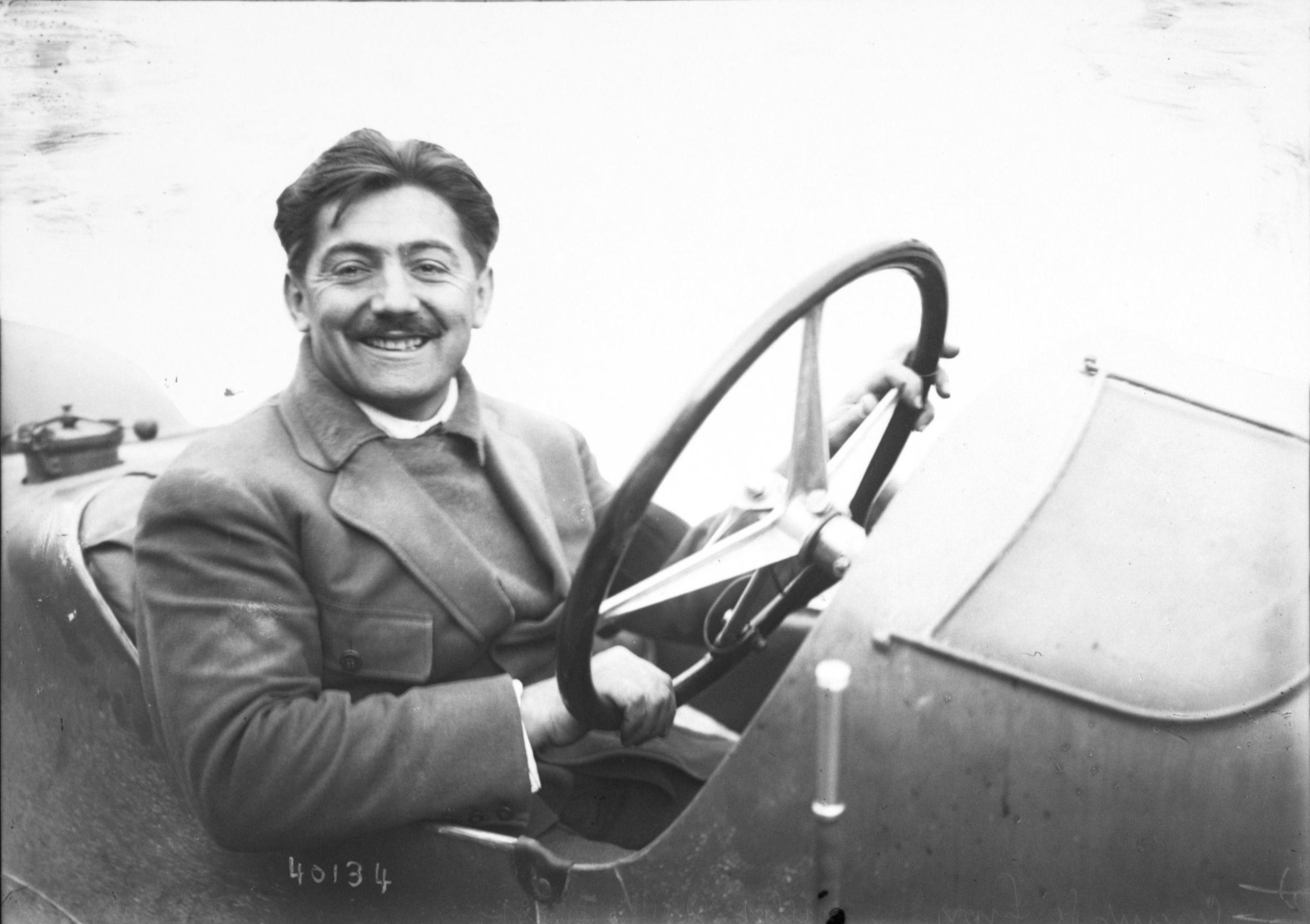
- Boillot in 1914
- Born: Georges Louis Frédéric Boillot; 3 August 1884 Valentigney, Doubs, France
- Died: 19 May 1916 (aged 31) Vadelaincourt, Meuse, France

Champ Car career
- 1 race run over 1 year
- First race: 1914 Indianapolis 500 (Indianapolis)
Wins	Podiums	Poles
0	0	0

Georges Louis Frédéric Boillot (French pronunciation: [ʒɔʁʒ(ə) bwalo]; 3 August 1884 – 19 May 1916) was a French racing driver and World War I fighter pilot. He died aged 31 after his plane was shot down near Bar-le-Duc by German fighters; he was deemed Mort pour la France.

== Biography ==
Born in Valentigney, Doubs, Boillot was a mechanic by training who began automobile racing in 1908. He went on to join drivers Paul Zuccarelli and Jules Goux to help create a novel range of racing cars as part of the Peugeot team. He debuted with them in 1909 in the Coupe de l'Auto at Rambouillet and in 1910, went to Italy to compete in the Targa Florio.

At Dieppe, France, on 26 June 1912, Boillot won the French Grand Prix, in his Peugeot L76, a vehicle designed by a group consisting of the young Swiss engineer, Ernest Henry in association with Zuccarelli, Goux and Boillot. This was the first motorcar in the world to have an engine with two overhead camshafts and four valves per cylinder. Boillot won the Coupe de l'Auto in 1913 and became the darling of French racing fans when he won his second straight French Grand Prix at Amiens, becoming the first driver to win the French Grand Prix twice.

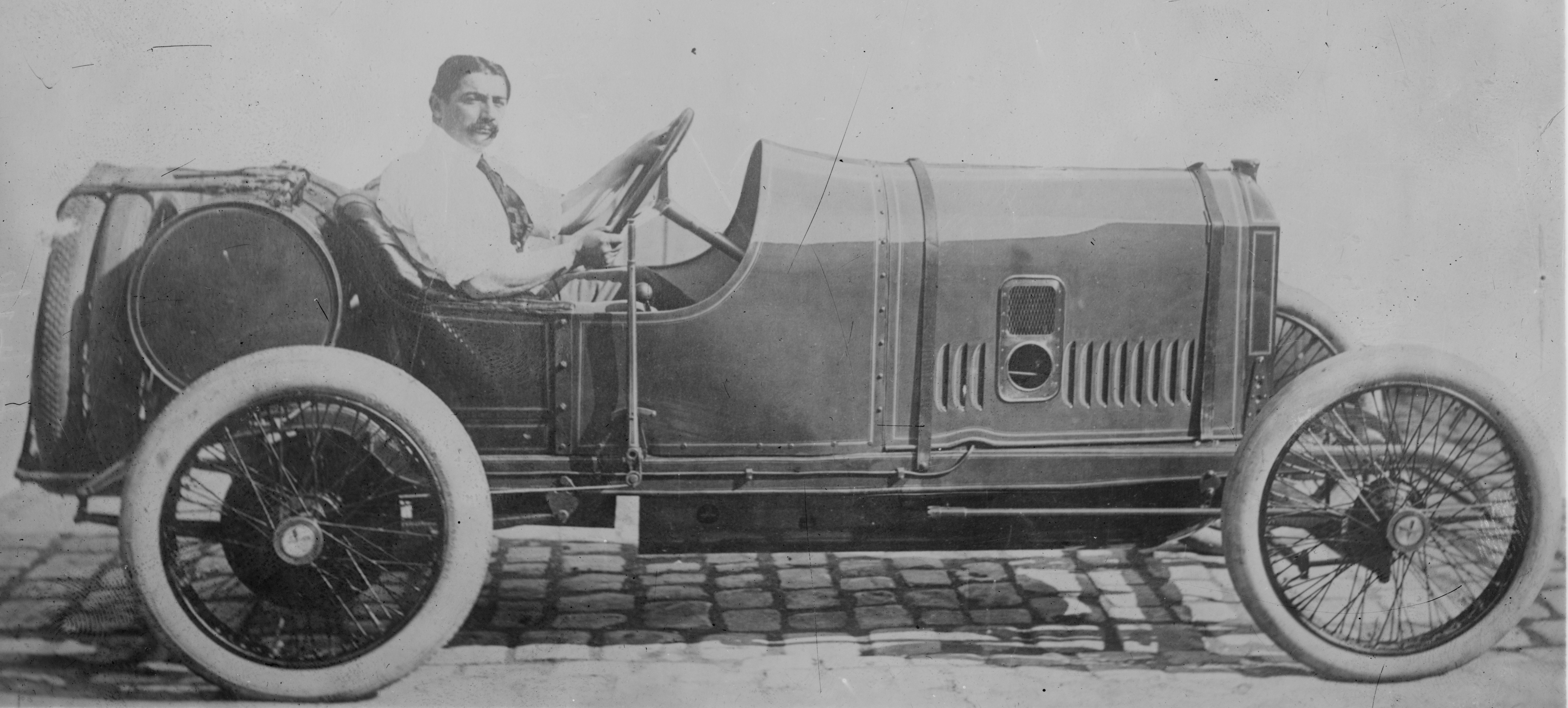
Boillot in his Peugeot EX3

That same year Boillot's Peugeot teammate, Goux, became the first Frenchman to win the Indianapolis 500. The following year, France again sent a number of competitors to the Indiana speedway where on 27 May, during qualifying, Boillot came tantalizingly close to breaking the 100 mile-an-hour (161 km/h) barrier when he set a new speed record of 99.86 mph (160.70 km/h). During the race, Boillot suffered repeated tire trouble. He ended up finishing 14th.

In what would turn out to be his last race, the 1914 French Grand Prix at Lyon, Boillot's Peugeot was literally falling apart at the end. After demonstrating his tremendous skills by keeping the vehicle running and near the lead, it finally overheated on the last lap and he was forced to retire.

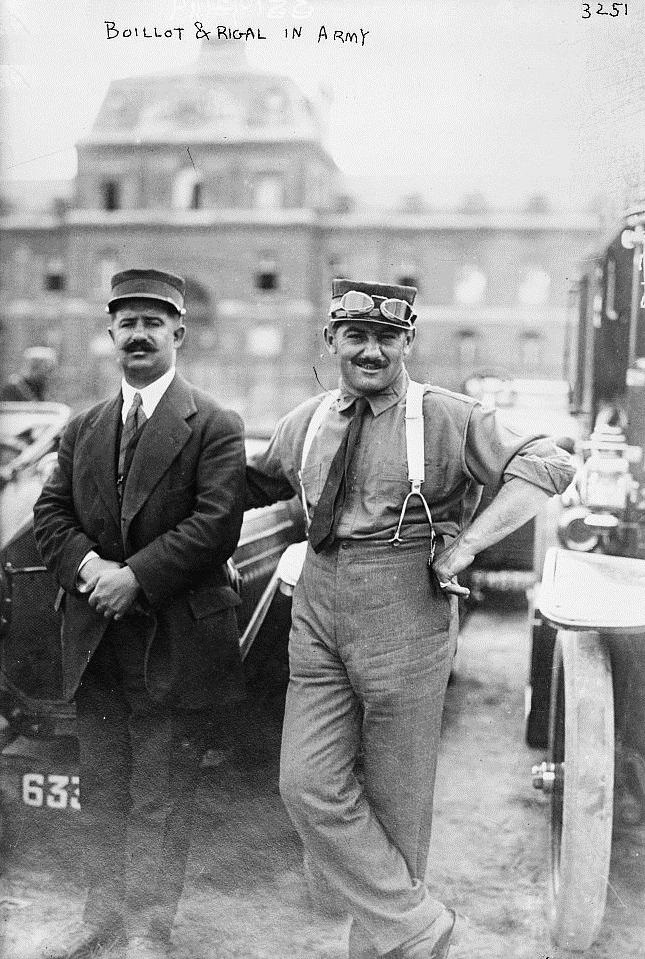
Boillot and Georges Rigal in the French Army in 1914

With the outbreak of World War I, Boillot joined the new French Air Force, but was initially given the task of being a driver for the commander-in-chief, General Joseph Joffre, who used Boillot's fast driving to maintain personal oversight of French armies. Frustrated at his duties away from the front lines he requested to join a fighting unit and promptly embarked on becoming an Ace flyer. On 21 April 1916 his plane was shot down in a dogfight with five German Fokkers, of which he was able to shoot one down before he himself was downed, crashing near Bar-le-Duc. Severely injured, he died in a military hospital at Vadelaincourt, Meuse. For his time as a flyer, he was awarded the War Cross and made a knight of the Legion of Honour.

Boillot was deemed Mort pour la France and inhumated at Père Lachaise Cemetery in Paris in 1921.

== Legacy ==
In his honor, several places in France named a street for Boillot and there is a George Boillot School in Montlhéry in the Essonne département near Paris.

Bolliot's brother André was also a race driver and at war's end, won the 1919 Targa Florio. Georges' son, Jean, became director-general of Peugeot Talbot Sport cars and in 1981 was responsible for involving Peugeot in rallying.

== Motorsports career results ==
=== Indianapolis 500 results ===
Year	Car	Start	Qual	Rank	Finish	Laps	Led	Retired
1914	7	29	99.860 mph	1	14	141	0	Broken frame
Totals						141	0	

Starts	1
Poles	0
Front Row	0
Wins	0
Top 5	0
Top 10	0
Retired	1
