= Circuito delle Madonie =

Motorsport venue in Italy

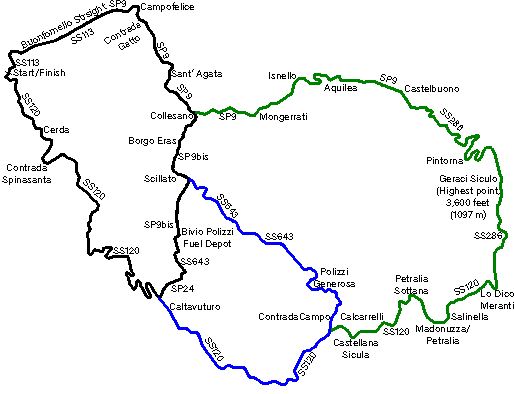
- All the Targa Florio Madonie circuit variants Black: Piccolo circuit Blue: Medio circuit Green: Grande circuit
- Location: Madonie (near Palermo, Sicily, Italy)
- Coordinates: 37°56′52″N 13°47′10″E
- Opened: 1906
- Closed: 1977 (used since 1978 for rally events)
- Major events: Current: Targa Florio Rally (1978–2016, 2018–present); Former: Targa Florio (1906–1911, 1919–1936, 1951–1977)

Piccolo circuit (1932–1973)
- Length: 72.00 km (44.74 mi)
- Race lap record: 33:36.000 ( (Finland) Leo Kinnunen, Porsche 908/3, 1970, Group 6)

Medio circuit (1919–1930)
- Length: 108.00 km (67.11 mi)
- Race lap record: 1:21:21.600 ( (Italy) Achille Varzi, Alfa Romeo P2, 1930, GP)

Grande circuit (1906–1931)
- Length: 148.82 km (92.47 mi)
- Race lap record: 2:03:54.800 ( (Italy) Achille Varzi, Bugatti T51, 1931, GP)

The Circuito delle Madonie was a road racing course made up of public roads, situated on the Italian island of Sicily, near the capital of Palermo, which hosted the famous Targa Florio event, between 1906 and 1977. The original public roads are still used today for the Targa Florio Rally successor event, which has been held since 1978. The course was made up of three different circuit length variations; the 72.00 km (44.74 mi) Piccolo short/small circuit, the slightly larger 108.0 km (67.1 mi) Medio medium circuit, and the full 148.821 km (92.473 mi) Grande circuit.

== Track ==
=== Course variants ===
Several versions of the track were used. It started with a single lap of a 148.82 km (92.47 mi) circuit from 1906–1911 and 1931. From 1912 to 1914 a tour around the perimeter of Sicily was used, with a single lap of 975 km (606 mi), lengthened to 1,080 km (670 mi) from 1948 to 1950. The 148.82 km (92.47 mi) "Grande" circuit was then shortened twice, the first time to 108.00 km (67.11 mi), the version used from 1919–1930, and then to the 72.00 km (44.74 mi) circuit used from 1932 to 1936 and 1951 to 1977. From 1951–1958, the long coastal island tour variant was used for a separate event called the Giro di Sicilia (Lap of Sicily).

The start and finish took place at Cerda. The counter-clockwise lap lead from Caltavuturo and Collesano from an altitude over 600 metres (1,970 ft) down to sea level, where the cars raced from Campofelice di Roccella on the Buonfornello straight along the coast, a straight that was even longer than the Mulsanne Straight at the Circuit de la Sarthe in Le Mans. The longest version of the circuit went south through Caltavuturo (whereas the shortest version of the open-road circuit went east just before entry into Caltavuturo, through a mountainous section directly to Collesano) through an extended route through elevation changes, and climbed uphill through the nearby towns of Castellana, Sottana, Madonnuzza and Miranti, twisting around mountains up to the highest point- 1,100 metres (3,600 ft) at Geraci Siculo, dropping down 620 metres (2,030 ft) into Castelbuono, twisting around more mountains and passing through Isnello and the village of Mongerrati and then rejoined the most recent version of the track at Collesano. The second version of the track also went south through Caltavuturo and took a shortcut starting right before Castellana to Collesano via the town of Polizzi Generosa. There was a closed circuit called Favorita Park in the Sicilian capital of Palermo used from 1937-1940. All the roads used for all the variations of the circuits are still in use today. Originally a narrow 2-lane country road, the Buonfornello straight became a lot wider in the late 1960's thanks to the development of the Autostrade motorways all over Italy.

The challenge of the Targa was unprecedented in its difficulty and the driving experience of any of the course variants was unlike any other circuit in the world other than perhaps that of the Nurburgring in Germany and (for motorcycles) the much faster but similar Snaefell Mountain Course on the Isle of Man. All of the variants had 18 to 23 corners per mile (11 to 14 corners per kilometer)- the original Grande 146 km (91 mi) circuit had in the realm of 2,000 corners per lap, the 108 km (67 mi) Medio had about 1,300-1,400 corners per lap and the final iteration of the course, the 72 km (45 mi) Piccolo circuit had about 800-900 corners per lap. To put that into perspective, most purpose-built circuits have between 12 and 18 corners, and the longest purpose-built circuit in the world, the 13-mile Nurburgring, has about 180 corners. So learning any of the Targa Florio courses was extremely difficult and required, like most long circuits, at least 60 laps to learn the course- and unlike the purpose-built Nurburgring, the course had to be learned properly in public traffic, and one lap of even the Piccolo course would take about an hour to do in a road car- if there was little to no traffic. To even finish this punishing race required a very reliable car- and it being a slow, twisty circuit it was very hard on the gearbox, brakes and the suspension of a car. Some manufacturers and entrants, particularly non-Italian ones would sometimes outright skip the Targa because of the difficulty of learning the layout and were unsure if their cars could stand the brutal pace there.

=== Lap speeds ===
Like a rally event (and events like the Isle of Man TT and the Mille Miglia), the race cars were started one by one every 15 seconds for a time trial, as a start from a full grid was not possible on the tight and twisty roads.

Although the public road circuit used for the Targa was extremely challenging- it was a very different kind of circuit and race from any other race on the sportscar calendar. All of the circuit variations of the Targa had so many corners that lap speeds at the Targa never went higher than 130 km/h (80 mph), as opposed to Le Mans in France, where cars would average 150+ mph (240+ km/h) or the Nürburgring, where cars would average 180 km/h (110 mph). Helmut Marko set the lap record in 1972 in an Alfa Romeo 33TT3 at 33 min 41 s at an average of 128.253 km/h (79.693 mph) during an epic charge where he made up 2 minutes on Arturo Merzario and his Ferrari 312PB. The fastest ever was Leo Kinnunen in 1970, lapping in the Porsche 908/3 at 128.571 km/h (79.890 mph) or 33 min 36 seconds flat.

Due to the track's length, drivers practised in the week before the race in public traffic, often with their race cars fitted with license plates. Porsche factory drivers even had to watch onboard videos, a sickening experience for some. The lap record for the 148.82 km (92.47 mi) "Grande" circuit was 2 hours 3 min 54.8 seconds set by Achille Varzi in a Bugatti Type 51 at the 1931 race at an average speed of 70.7 km/h (43.931 mph). The lap record for the 108.00 km (67.11 mi) "Medio" circuit was 1 hour 21 min 21.6 seconds set by Varzi in an Alfa Romeo P2 at an average speed of 79.642 km/h (49.487 mph) at the 1930 race. The fastest completion around the short version of the island tour was done by Giovanni "Ernesto" Ceirano in a SCAT at the 1914 race, completed in 16 hours, 51 minutes and 31.6 seconds from May 24–25, 1914. The fastest completion of the long version of the island tour was by Mario and Franco Bornigia in an Alfa Romeo 6C 2500 Competizione, completed in 12 hours, 26 minutes and 33 seconds flat at the 1950 race at an average speed of 86.794 km/h (53.931 mph).

=== 1970s, safety and demise ===
In the late 1960s and early 1970s, race cars with up to 600 hp (450 kW) such as Nino Vaccarella's Ferrari 512S raced through small mountain villages while spectators sat or stood right next to, or even on, the road. Porsche, on the other hand, did not race its big and powerful Porsche 917, but rather the smaller and nimble Porsche 908/03 Spyders.

Due to safety concerns, especially by Helmut Marko, who called the race "totally insane", the last Targa Florio as a World Sportscar Championship race was run in 1973; when it had become impossible to retain its international status after a number of accidents, two of which were fatal; one which privateer Charles Blyth crashed his Lancia Fulvia HF into a trailer at the end of the Buonfornello straight and was killed; and another where an Italian driver crashed his Alpine-Renault into a group of spectators, killing one. There were several other accidents during practice for the 1973 event in which a total of seven spectators sustained injuries. The event was won by a Porsche 911 Carrera RSR as the prototypes such as Jacky Ickx's Ferrari suffered crashes or other troubles.

The Targa's international demise was compounded because of widespread concern about the organizers' ability to properly maintain the race on such a massive circuit, and there were not enough marshals - most spectators sat too close to the roads; and also the international automotive governing body, the FIA, mandated safety walls on all circuits that were going to hold FIA-mandated events from 1974 onwards, and the 44-mile (71 km) length of combined public roads made this simply impossible and totally impracticable, especially from a financial standpoint: the sport's growing professionalism was something the Targa's organizers simply could not keep up with. One example of this concern was when Briton Brian Redman crashed his Porsche 908/03 during the 1971 event 20 miles into the first lap. The steering on his car broke, and it hit a stone wall and caught fire. Redman had second-degree burns all over his body and it took 45 minutes for any medical help to reach Redman (while he was attended to by spectators who were trying to keep him cool by waving objects). The Porsche team did not know where he was for 12 hours until teammates Pedro Rodriguez and Richard Attwood found him in a local clinic.

The Targa was continued as a national event for some years, before a crash in 1977 where hillclimbing specialist Gabriele Ciuti went off the road and crashed at the fast curves at the end of the Buonfornello straight after some of the bodywork flew off his BMW-powered Osella prototype. This accident killed 2 spectators and seriously injured 5 others (including Ciuti, who went into a coma, but survived), and effectively sealed the race's fate. After this accident the race was forcibly taken over by local police and was stopped on the 4th lap, and it also saw 2 other drivers having serious accidents; one of them was critically injured, but survived.

Although the Targa Florio was a rally-type race that took place on closed-off public mountain roads with (aside from straw bales and weak guardrails at some of the turns, the latter were installed by the island's government) practically no safety features, only 9 people – including spectators – died at the event over the 71 year and 61 race history using a total of 6 circuit configurations. This number is relatively small compared to other open road races, like the Mille Miglia, where over a period of 30 years and 24 races, 56 people lost their lives and the Carrera Panamericana, where over a period of 5 years and 5 races, 25 people were killed. This is probably due to the fact that the mountain roads used were extremely slow and twisty, and average lap speeds never reached even 80 mph (130 km/h) even up to the final years of the race's history, even with the very long straight at the northernmost of the track, whereas most road circuits had average speeds anywhere between 110 mph (180 km/h) and even 160 mph (260 km/h).
