= Blitzen Benz =

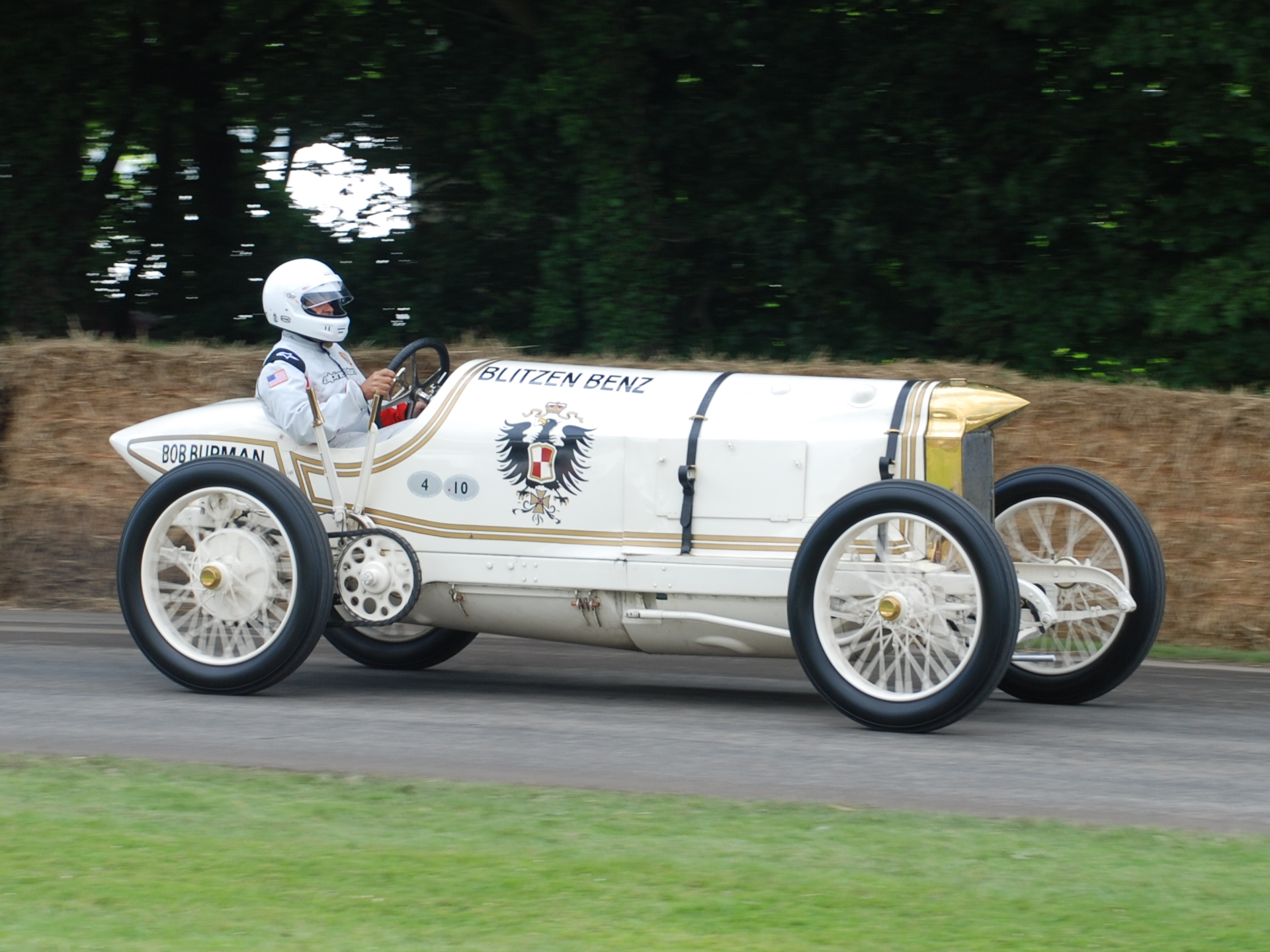

Overview
- Manufacturer: Benz & Cie
- Production: 1909
- Assembly: Mannheim, Germany

Body and chassis
- Class: Racecar
- Body style: Roadster
- Layout: Front engine, rear-wheel drive Dual-chain drive

Powertrain
- Engine: 21,504 cm^{3} (1,312.3 in^{3}) I4
- Transmission: 4-speed manual gate-type shift

Dimensions
- Wheelbase: 2,800 mm (110.2 in)
- Length: 4,820 mm (189.8 in)
- Width: 1,600 mm (63.0 in)
- Height: 1,280 mm (50.4 in)
- Curb weight: 1,450 kg (3,196.7 lb)

The Blitzen Benz is a racing car that was built by Benz & Cie in Mannheim, Germany, in 1909. In 1910 an enhanced model broke the world land speed record. It was one of six cars based on the Grand Prix car, but it had an enlarged engine, 21,504 cm^{3} (1,312.3 in^{3}), inline-four and improved aerodynamics.

== History ==
Of the six Blitzen Benzes made, only two survive—Mercedes-Benz owns one, while the other belongs to an American collector.

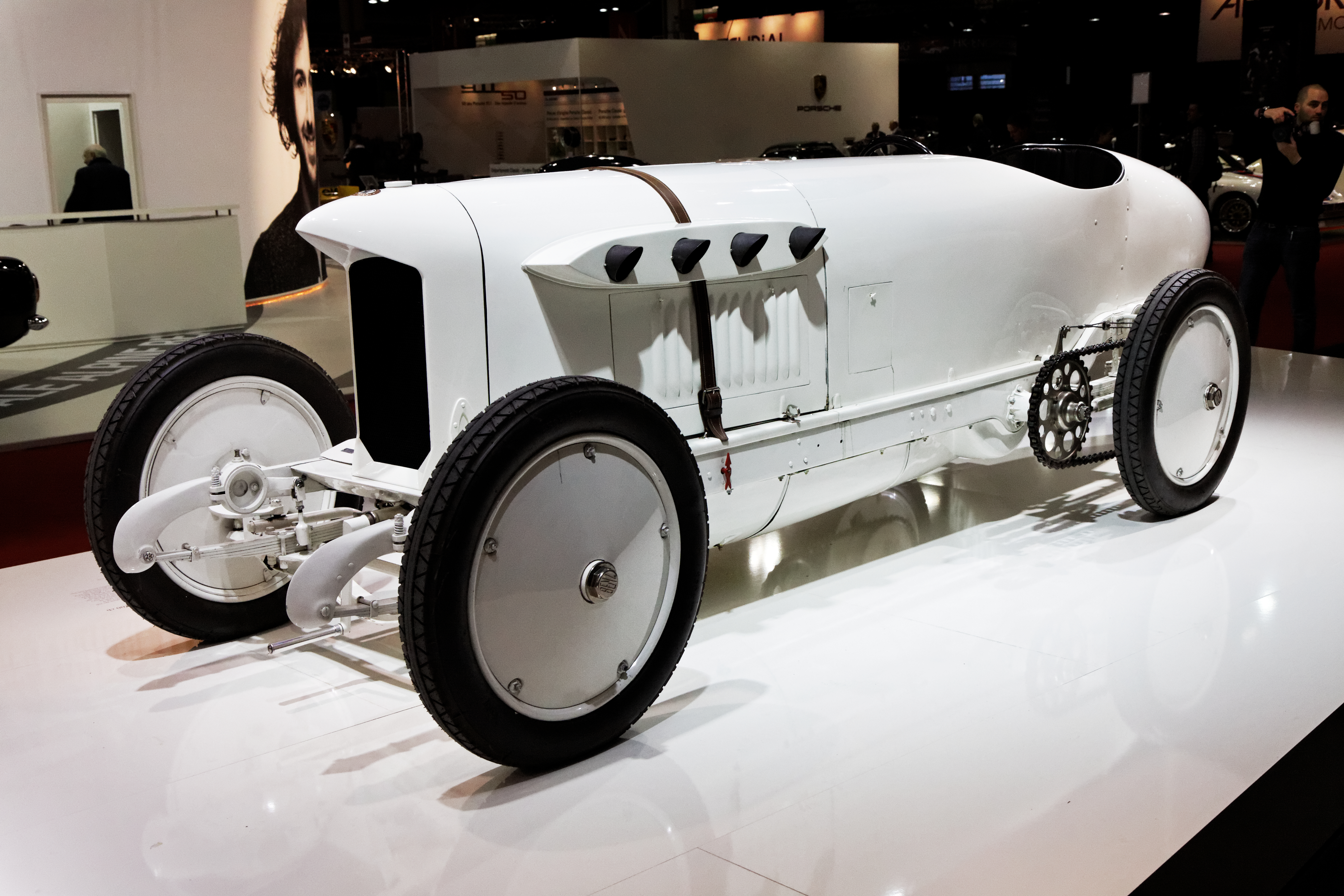
Blitzen Benz 4

At Brooklands on 9 November 1909, land speed racer Victor Hémery of France set a record with an average speed of 202.7 kilometres per hour (126.0 mph) over a kilometre.

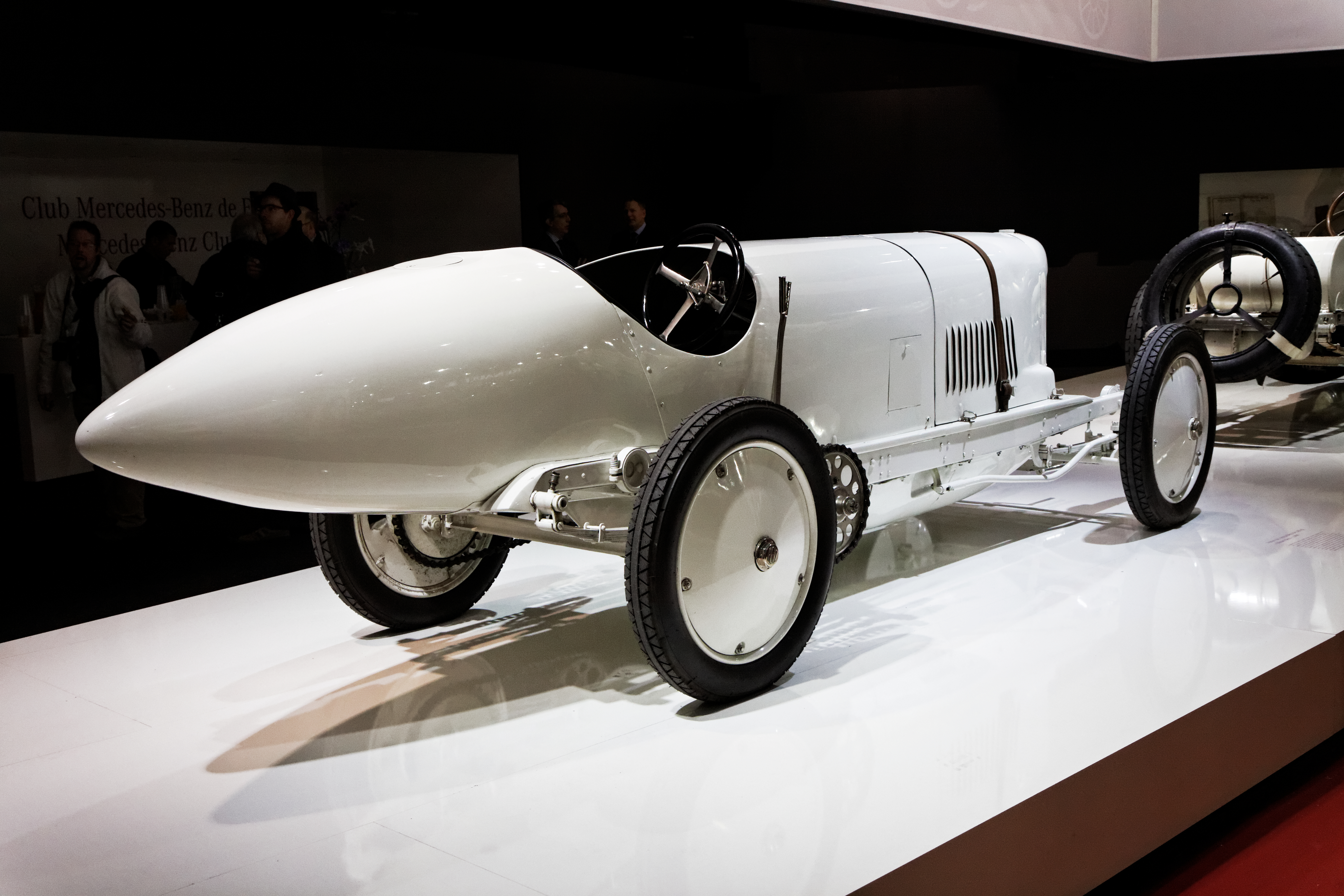
Rear view

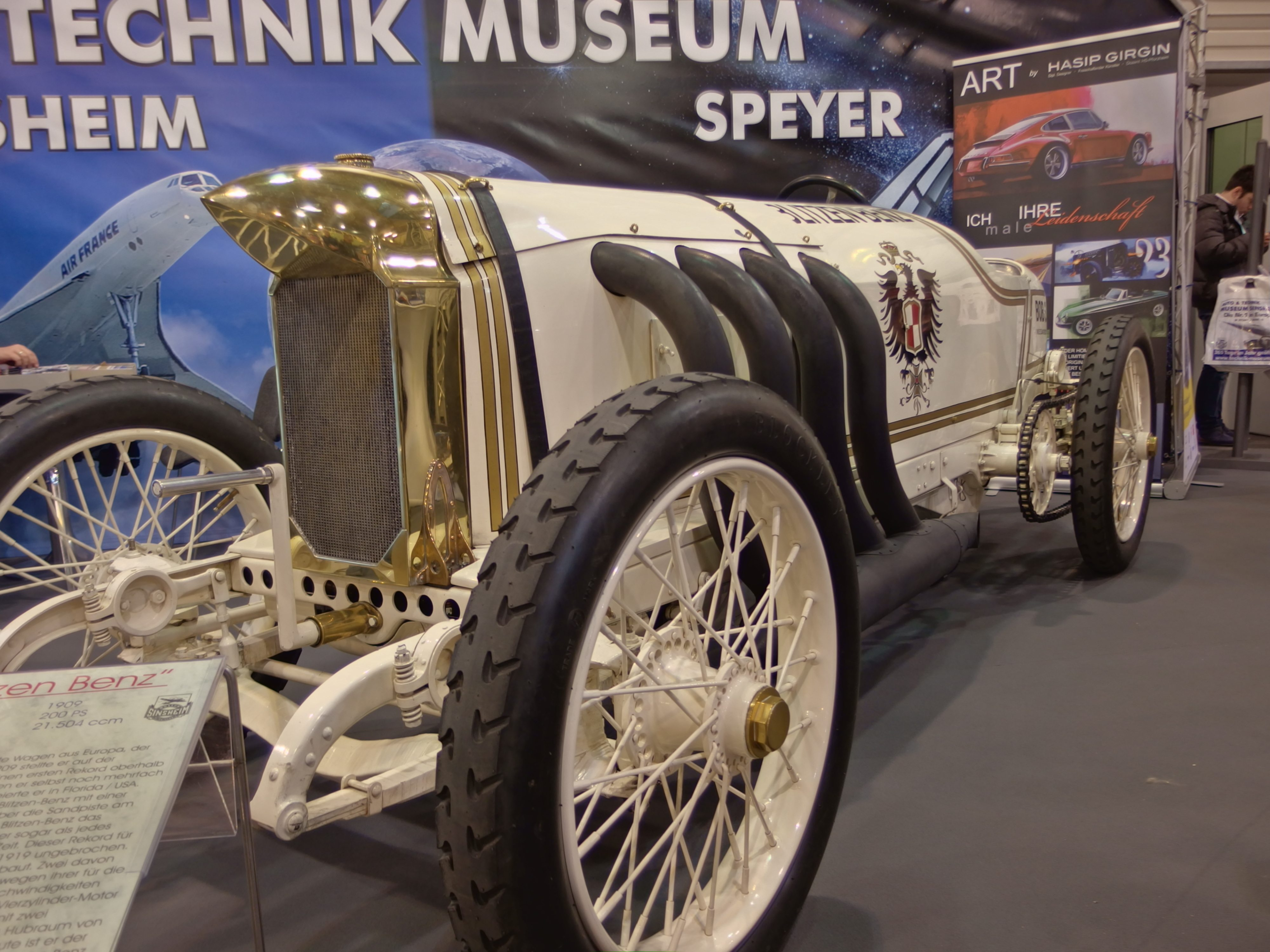
A 1909 Benz 200 Blitzen Benz

On 23 April 1911, Bob Burman recorded an average of 228.1 kilometres per hour (141.7 mph) over a full mile at Daytona Beach, breaking Glenn Curtiss's unofficial absolute speed record, land, sea or air, set in 1907 on his V-8 motorcycle. Burman's record stood until 1919.

At Brooklands on 24 June 1914, land speed racer British driver Lydston Hornsted, in Blitzen Benz No 3, set a record with an average speed of 200.7 kilometres per hour (124.7 mph) with 2 runs over a 1-mile course, under the new regulations of the Association International des Automobile Clubs Reconnus (AIACR).

After 1914 the car was rebuilt for circuit racing, undergoing a number of revisions before it was broken up in 1923.

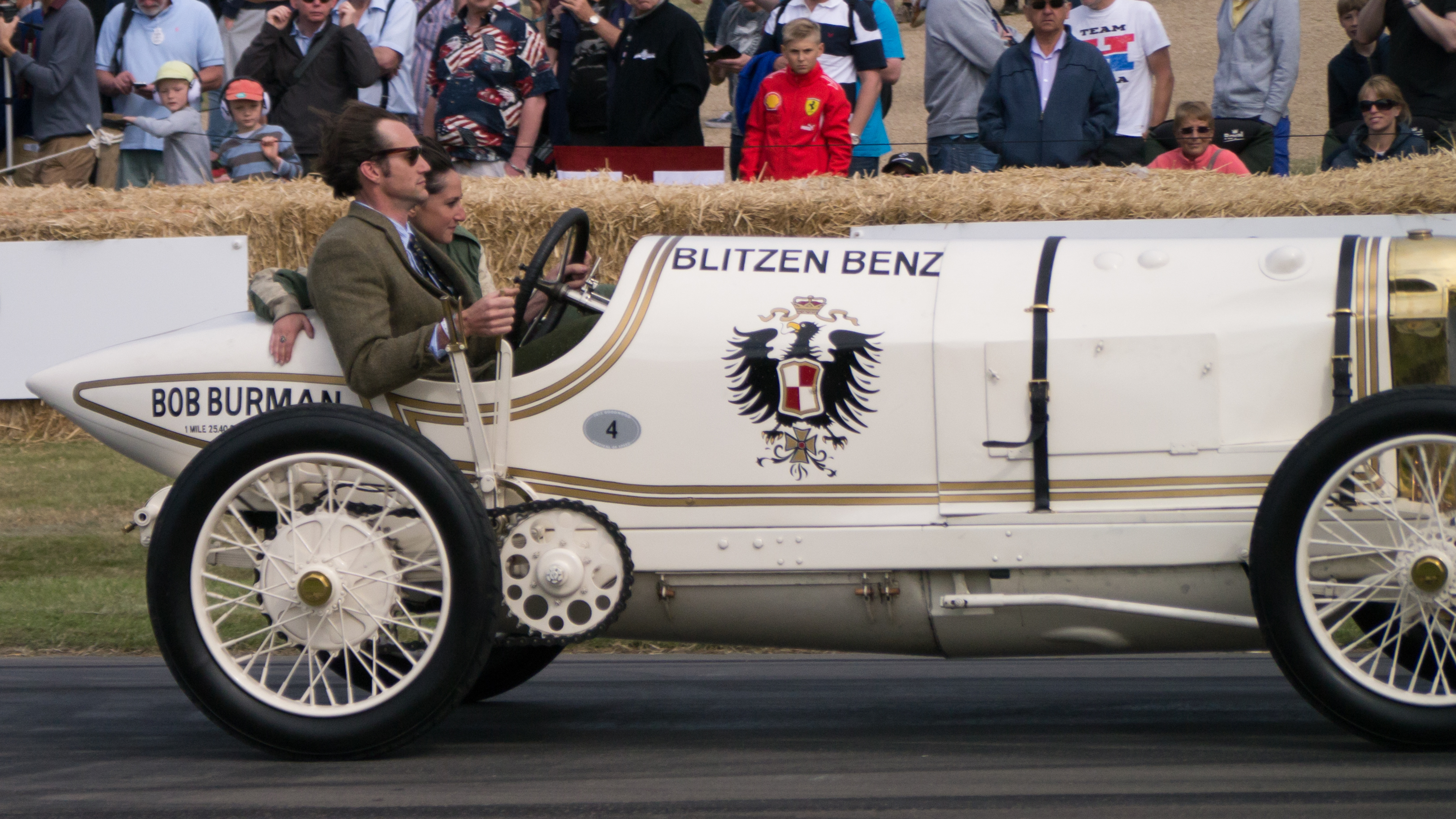
A 1909 Benz 200 Blitzen Benz at the 2015 Goodwood Festival of Speed

== Technical Data ==
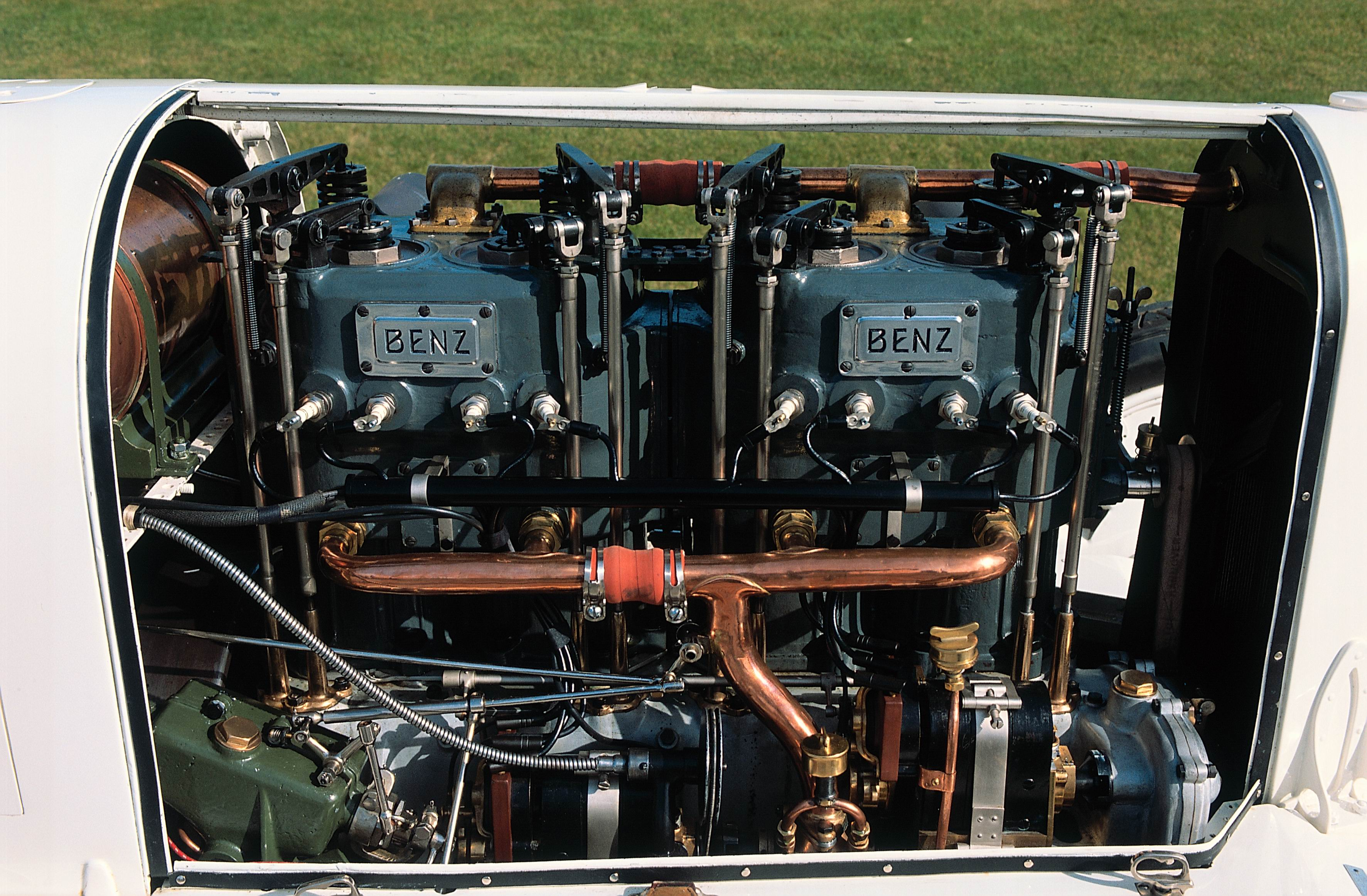

Benz	Racing car engine
Working process	Four-stroke Otto
Cylinders	4 / in-line
Displacement	21,504 cm^{3}
Bore × stroke	185 × 200 mm
Power	200 hp at 1600 rpm
Torque	over 875 Nm
Compression ratio	1:5.8
Maximum speed	1650 rpm
Valves	hanging, 2 per cylinder, side camshaft, drive via gears
Mixture preparation	1 horizontal round slide carburetor
Fuel supply	Pneumatic hand pump, operated by the passenger
Lubrication	Initially splash lubrication, later pressure circulation lubrication via gear pump and fresh oil addition
Starter	Starting crank, starter buzzer ignition
Ignition	High-voltage magneto ignition, 2 Bosch D4 magnetos
Ignition adjustment	by hand using a lever on the steering wheel
Fuel tank	73 l

== See also ==
- Land speed record
- Motorcycle land-speed record
- List of Mercedes-Benz vehicles
