= Sizaire-Berwick =

Anglo-French automaker active 1913-1927

Sizaire Berwick (Société Nouvelle des Autos Sizaire (1913-1927) F.W.Berwick & Co Ltd (1920-1925))
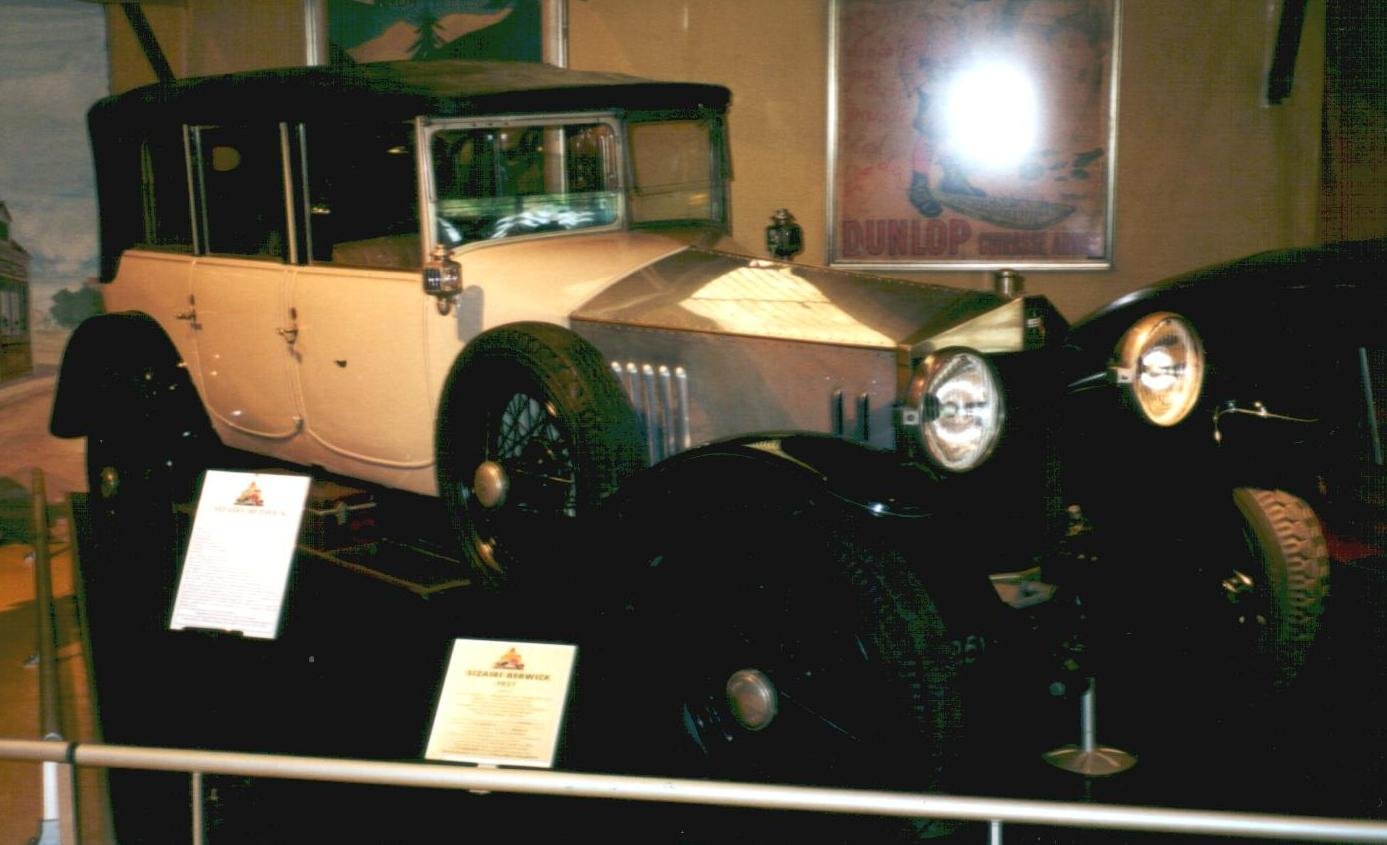
- Sizaire-Berwick (1927)
- Industry: Automotive
- Founded: 1913
- Founder: Maurice Sizaire (1877-1970); Georges Sizaire (1880-1924); Frederick William Berwick (1873); Alexander Keiller (1889-1955)
- Defunct: 1927
- Headquarters: Courbevoie, France; Park Royal, London, England

Sizaire-Berwick was an Anglo-French automobile manufacturer active between 1913 and 1927.

As established, the company manufactured luxury-sized cars at Courbevoie on the north side of Paris. The business was financed in England, however, and it was also in England that most of the cars were united with their bodies and found their customers.

For several years during the early 1920s, Sizaire-Berwick cars were also manufactured in England.

== Background ==
The brothers Maurice (1877–1970) and Georges Sizaire (1880–1924) founded the Sizaire-Naudin company in 1903. In 1912 the Sizaire brothers left the Sizaire-Naudin company, however, following disagreement with an investor.

== History of the business ==
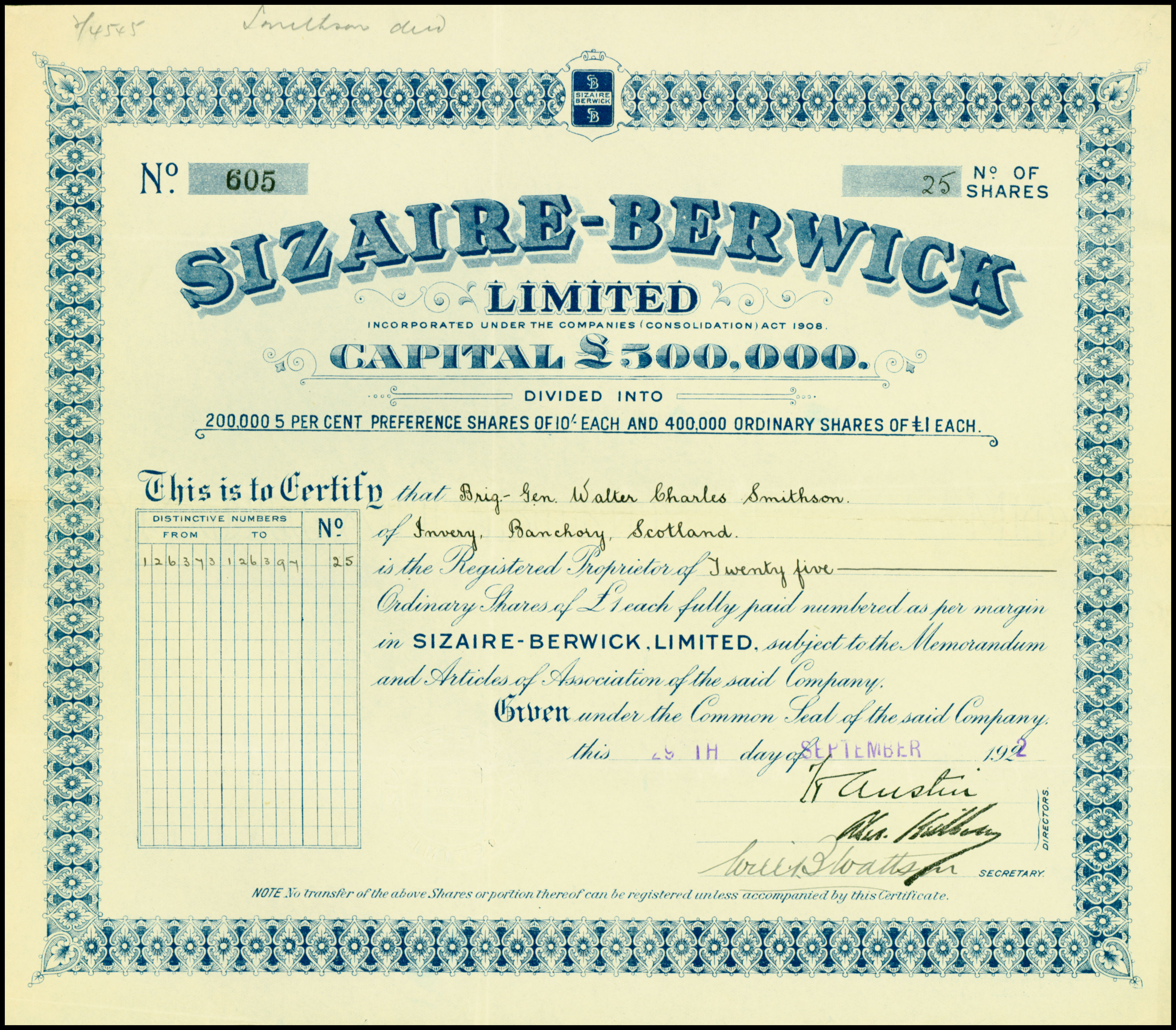
Share of the Sizaire-Berwick Ltd, issued 29 September 1922

Nevertheless, the Sizaire brothers' participation in the automotive business was far from over and, in 1913, with the help of Frederick William Berwick, the London-based UK importer of Corre La Licorne cars, they obtained finance in London for the launch of a new automobile manufacturing company called Sizaire-Berwick. The new company produced large luxury cars. The pre-cars were produced at the brothers' homebase in Courbevoie, on the northern edge of Paris, but 80% of the production was shipped to England, where they received their bodies, mostly fitted by Berwick's own coachbuilder located at Highgate, on the north side of London. Jack Warner, the actor who later portrayed British icon Dixon of Dock Green worked at the repair facilities in Balham, where he had started by sweeping the floors for 2d per hour. In August 1913 he was sent to work as a mechanic in Paris and to drive completed chassis to the coast. By the time war broke out in 1914, 139 cars had been produced.

In 1915, Berwick built a new factory at Park Royal, a London suburb used initially for the production of aeroplanes. Following the outbreak of peace, Berwick founded, in 1919, the company F. W. Berwick & Co Ltd and in 1920 he started production of British-built Sizaire-Berwicks. These continued to be produced until 1925.

In 1919, the French end of the business was acquired by an American named Burke. He started out by importing cars from Berwick's factory in England, but very soon after this the company was again producing cars at Courbevoie. In 1923, Austin gained a controlling share in the British end of the business.

By the end of 1922, none of the firm's founders was active in the company. The Sizaire brothers were busy with the new Sizaire Frères business while Berwick was involved with another Luxury automaker called Windsor. Sizaire-Berwicks continued to emerge, albeit in small numbers, from the Courbevoie factory until 1927. At least four French produced Sizaire-Berwicks were believed to have survived in 2010.

== The cars ==
The first Sizaire-Berwick came with 3014 cm^{3} engine supplied by Decolange. This was quickly replaced with a 4-litre (20 CV) monobloc unit. The radiator grill on the early cars very closely resembled that of a Rolls-Royce, but, with litigation looming, the flat fronted grill on the Sizaire-Berfwick was replaced with one that featured a shallow V-shaped profile.

At the Paris Motor Show in October 1919 Sizaire-Berwick took a stand and exhibited a "torpedo" bodied car powered by a 4-cylinder engine of 4523 cm^{3}. Four cylinder engines of this size were by now unusual, but this one was described as a "very smooth-running" unit. Maximum power was listed at 60 hp, achieved at just 2000 rpm. With a 3,430 mm (135.0 in) wheelbase, the car continued Sizaire-Berwick's large car tradition established in 1913.

Five years later, at the Paris Motor Show in October 1924 Sizaire-Berwick were still taking a stand and exhibiting a car with the same 4523 cm^{3} engine as before, but with the wheelbase now extended to 3,680 mm (144.9 in). In 1925, the manufacture entered one of their 4 1/2-litre engine cars in the Le Mans 24 Hour race, but the car completed only 23 laps and was not classified.

Two years after that, Sizaire-Berwick appeared at the Paris Motor Show for the last time, displaying a large luxury car, now with a 6-cylinder engine from Lycoming of Pennsylvania.

After 1923, with Austin having taken a controlling share, the British end of the Sizaire Berwick business offered two models with Austin 1861 cm^{3} and 3610 cm^{3} four cylinder engines, as well as a 3397 cm^{3} six cylinder unit. The last British Sizaire-Berwicks were produced in 1925.
