= Sizaire Frères =

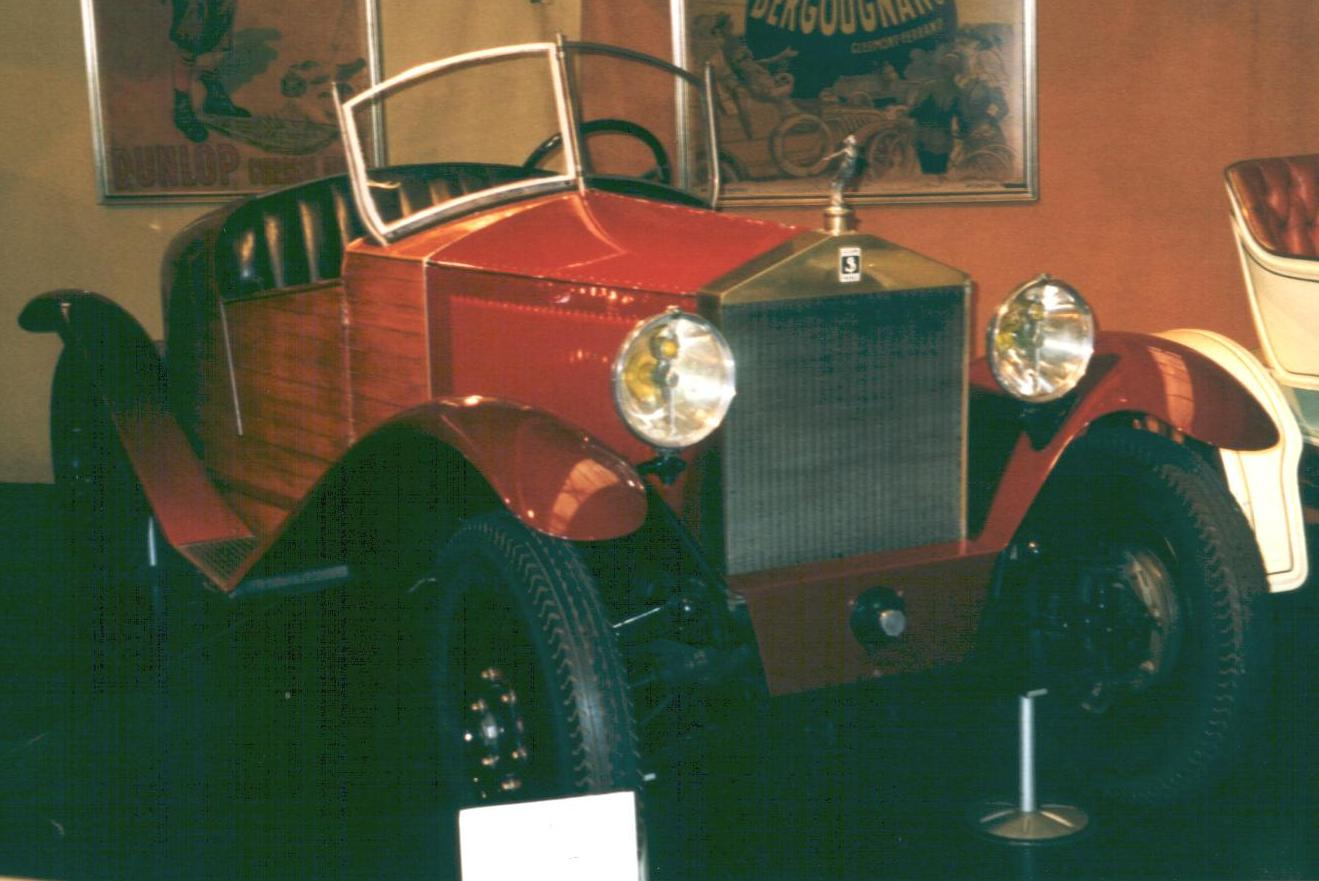
- Sizaire Frères (1926)
- Industry: Automotive
- Founded: 1920
- Founder: Maurice Sizaire; Georges Sizaire
- Defunct: 1929
- Headquarters: Courbevoie, France 1920-1927; Levallois-Perret, France (1927-1929)
- Key people: Paul Dupuy
- Products: cars

Sizaire Frères was a French automobile manufacturer established by the brothers Maurice (1877–1970) and Georges Sizaire (1880–1934) in 1920, and producing cars between 1923 and 1929.

The company was located at Courbevoie on the north side of Paris, but relocated in 1927 to nearby Levallois-Perret following the death of Paul Dupuy, who till then had participated in the running of the business.

== Background and history ==
By 1920, when they established Sizaire Frères , Maurice (1877–1970) and Georges Sizaire were well known in the Paris-centred auto-business. They had founded the auto-producer the Sizaire-Naudin in 1903, but left the company in 1912. In 1920 they were also still involved with Sizaire-Berwick, which may in part explain the three-year gap between the founding of their third automotive business and the appearance of its first car. The car itself was nevertheless more technically innovative than the Sizaire-Berwick products.

Around 1927, the business relocated the short distance to Levallois-Perret, and this was accompanied by a name change to Société Nouvelle des Autos Sizaire. A further name change, to SA de Gérance des Automobiles Sizaire, followed in July 1929. Production nevertheless came to an end in 1929, by which date approximately 1150 cars had been produced.

== The cars ==
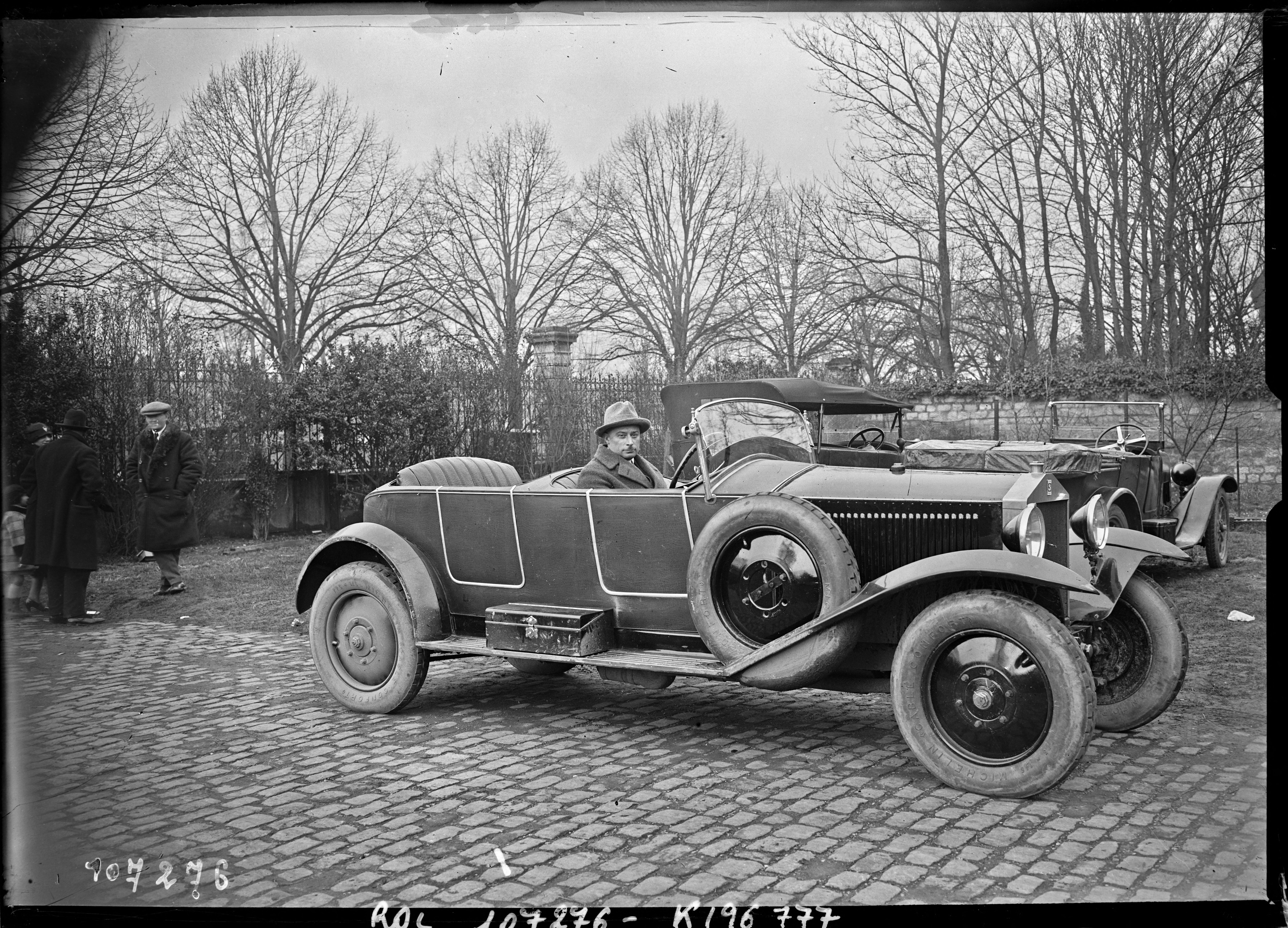
One of the founders, Georges Sizaire, in a Sizaire at the 1926 Critérium Paris-Nice

The company's initial offering was the Sizaire Frères 4 RI, also known as the Sizaire Frères 11CV. The car was powered by an advanced 1,993 cc 4-cylinder engine with a maximum output listed as 50 HP and incorporating an overhead camshaft. The car was exceptional for its time in featuring independent suspension on all four wheels. By 1927 approximately 900 of these cars had been produced.

For the 1928 model year the manufacturer followed up with the Sizaire Frères Six, which was fitted with a six-cylinder sleeve valve engine of 2,910 cc, bought in from Willys-Overland of Ohio. Approximately 150 of these were constructed.

Only about 100 examples of the manufacturer's final car were built. This was powered by 2,413 cc engine purchased from Hotchkiss, which also powered the Hotchkiss AM2 of the time.
