= British Rail Class 10 =

Class of diesel-electric locomotives

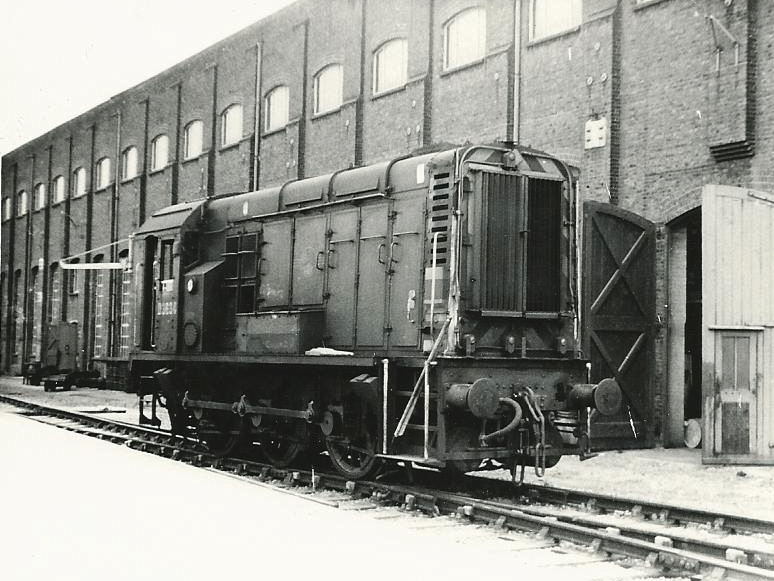
- A Class 10 at Stratford MPD in 1967
Type and origin
- Power type: Diesel-electric
- Builder: BR Darlington Works (140) and Doncaster Works (6)
- Build date: 1955–1962
- Total produced: 146
Specifications
- Configuration
  - Whyte: 0-6-0
  - UIC: C
- Gauge: 4 ft 8 1/2 in (1,435 mm) standard gauge
- Wheel diameter: 4 ft 6 in (1.372 m)
- Wheelbase: 11 ft 6 in (3.505 m)
- Length: 29 ft 3 in (8.92 m)
- Width: 8 ft 6 in (2.591 m)
- Height: 12 ft 8 1/2 in (3.874 m)
- Loco weight: 48.6 long tons (49.4 t; 54.4 short tons)
- Fuel capacity: 668 imp gal (3,040 L; 802 US gal)
- Prime mover: Blackstone ER6T
- Traction motors: GEC WT821 nose suspended, 2 off
- Transmission: Diesel-electric, double reduction gearing
- MU working: Not fitted
- Train heating: None
- Train brakes: Vacuum
Performance figures
- Maximum speed: 20 mph (32 km/h)
- Power output: Engine: 350 hp (261 kW)
- Tractive effort: Maximum: 35,000 lbf (155.7 kN); Continuous: 11,100 lbf (49.4 kN)
Career
- Operators: British Railways
- Numbers: 13137–13151; later D3137–D3151, D3439–D3453, D3473–D3502, D3612–D3651, D4049–D4094
- Axle load class: RA 5
- Withdrawn: February 1967- June 1972
- Disposition: Four preserved, remainder scrapped

The British Rail Class 10 diesel locomotives are a variant of the standard Class 08 diesel-electric shunter with a Lister Blackstone diesel engine and General Electric Company plc (GEC) traction motors. The locomotives were built at the BR Works in Darlington and Doncaster over the period 1955–1962, and were withdrawn between February 1967 and June 1972.

== Background ==
British Railways built four main variants of its standard large diesel-electric shunter. Those fitted with a Lister Blackstone diesel engine were classified D3/4 if they had GEC traction motors and D3/5 with British Thomson-Houston (BTH) traction motors. The D3/4 locomotives were later reclassified to become Class 10 under TOPS.

== Technical details ==
The locomotives had the same general outline, 0-6-0 wheel arrangement and outside frames as the earlier Class 11, built originally for the London, Midland and Scottish Railway after 1945, and perpetuated by British Railways as the Class 08. However, they were fitted with Lister Blackstone 6-cylinder, 4-stroke, ER6T engines and two GEC nose suspended motors.

== Building and use ==
The first batch of thirty locomotives, originally numbered 13137–13151, (later renumbered D3137–D3151) were built at Darlington works during 1955, and allocated to motive power depots in the North Eastern Region of British Railways, notably Thornaby. Further batches were built at Darlington as follows: D3439–D3453 (1957); D3473–D3491 (1957/8); D3612–D3651 (1958); D4049–D4094 (1961/2). These were allocated to the Eastern Region of British Railways particularly in the London area. Six examples, D3497–D3502, were built at Doncaster (1957/8). The class eventually numbered 146 locomotives.

== Withdrawal ==
As they were non-standard, compared to the 08 class they had relatively short lives and were withdrawn between February 1967 and June 1972. Twenty locomotives were sold to industrial customers.

Table of withdrawals
Year	Quantity in service at start of year	Quantity withdrawn	Locomotive numbers
1967	146	6	D3151, D3449/96, D3620/28/31.
1968	140	77	D3139–40/42/46–48/51, D3439–48/50–53/73–78/80–82/84–85/87–91/93–95 (Note: D3494 withdrawn due to accident damage)/97–99. D3500–02, D3624–27/30/32–33/35–37/40/43, D4064/71/76/80–94.
1969	63	21	D3143–44, D3479/83/92, D3612–14/16–19/21/23/29/38–39/42/45/47 (Note: Withdrawn July, reinstated August)/49.
1970	41	9	D3137/49, D3486, D3638 (Note: Reinstated March, withdrawn November)/44/47, D4052/67/77.
1971	34	14	D3141, D3634/41/46/48/50–51, D4050–51/53/55/59–60/65.
1972	20	20	D3138/45, D4049/54/56–58/61–63/66/68–70/72–75/78–79.

== Post BR Use ==
Locomotive Number	Location	Disposition
D3452	E.C.C. Ports Ltd., Fowey Jetties	Preserved - Bodmin and Wenford Railway
D3476	E.C.C Ports Ltd., Fowey Jetties	Scrapped
D3497	E.C.C. Ports Ltd., Fowey Jetties	Scrapped

== Preservation ==
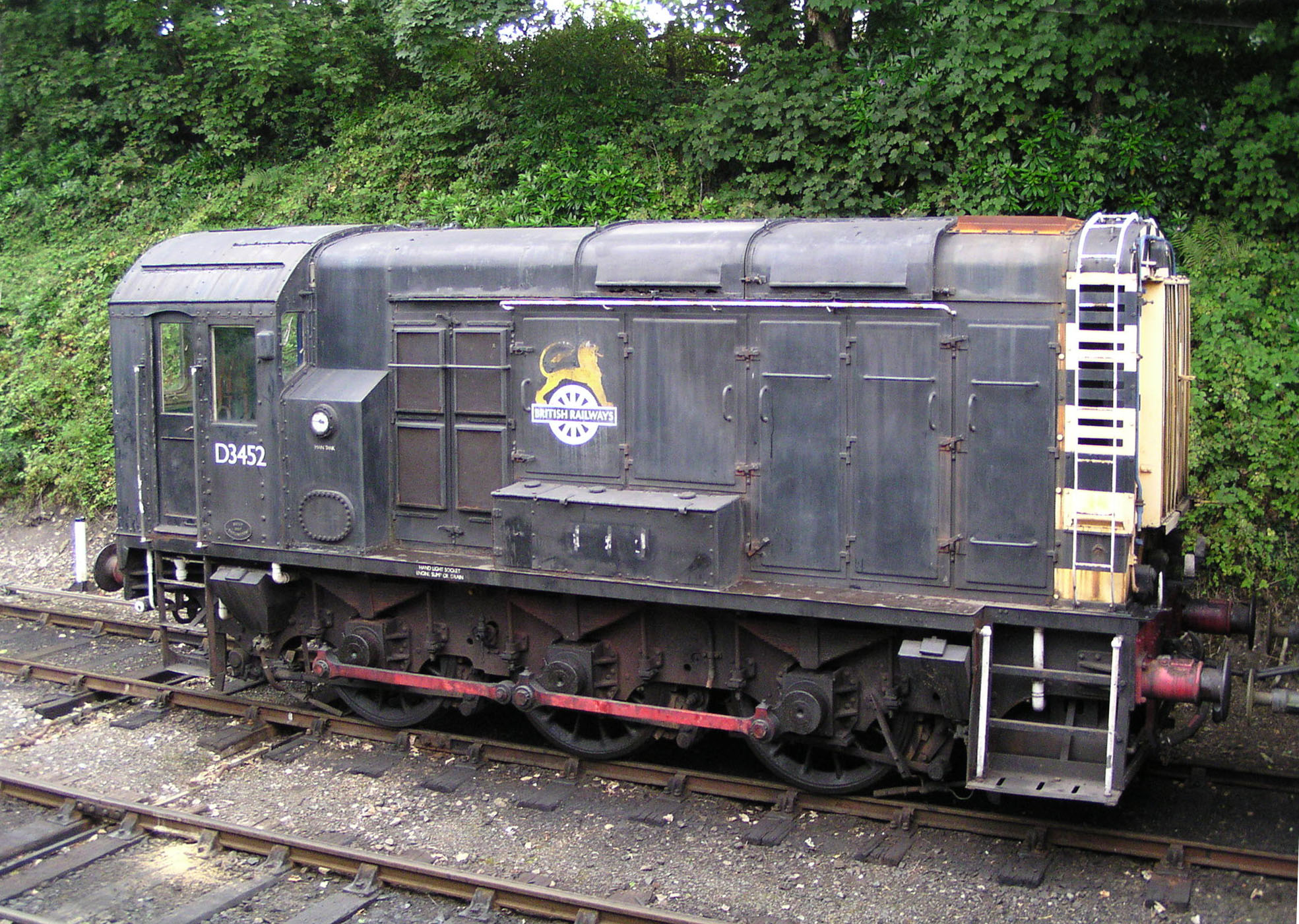
D3452, at Bodmin General in 2003. This locomotive is preserved on the Bodmin & Wenford Railway

Four examples have been preserved:

- D3452 at Bodmin and Wenford Railway. As of April 2026 it is awaiting an overhaul.
- D3489 at Helston Railway
- D4067 at Great Central Railway
- D4092 at Barrow Hill Engine Shed
- A fifth example, D3476, was stored on the Colne Valley Railway, though has since been scrapped.

== Model railways ==
Accurascale have announced their intention to produce a model of the Class 10 in OO gauge scale.
