= Windsor (British automobile) =

British automobile brand

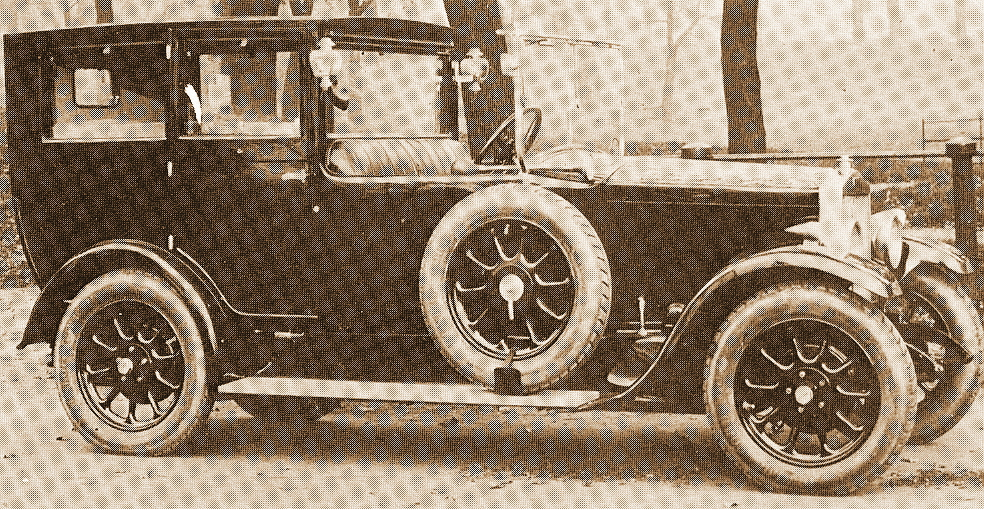
1926 MHV Windsor coupe-de-ville, manufactured in London

Windsor was a British automobile brand, designed and manufactured by James Bartle & Co. Ltd, in Notting Hill (London) between 1924–1927.

== Company History ==
James Bartle and Co of the Western Iron Works, Notting Hill, London, were founded in 1854 to build coachwork and metal castings. In 1870 their address was 236a Lancaster Road, in Notting Hill, London W11.

Cecil Stanley Windsor (1879–1926) joined the company in 1910 and subsequently purchased it to become managing director. He was educated at the Grocers' Company School in Hackney Downs; served his apprenticeship with The Pick Motor Company, Stamford, Lincolnshire; was foreman of the repair shop at Rock, Thorpe and Chatfield of Tunbridge Wells; managed the automobile branch of Parsons Motor Co in Southampton from 1909; and joined James Bartle & Co in 1910/1911 whence he became both managing director and owner. He died on 18 December 1925.

The first Windsor car was built in 1916 in the difficult circumstances of World War I. Production of the 10/15 hp light car ran from 1923–1927. The elegant, well-made car was probably too expensive, because after three years and circa 300 produced, it disappeared from the market.

James Bartle and Co ceased trading in 1927.

== Model ==
The only model from 1924–1927 used a 10.4 hp, 4 cylinder, overhead valve, 1,353cc engine. It had a wheelbase of 2,743mm, a track of 1,219mm and weighed 864 kg.
