= Belga Rise =

Belgian automobile manufacturer

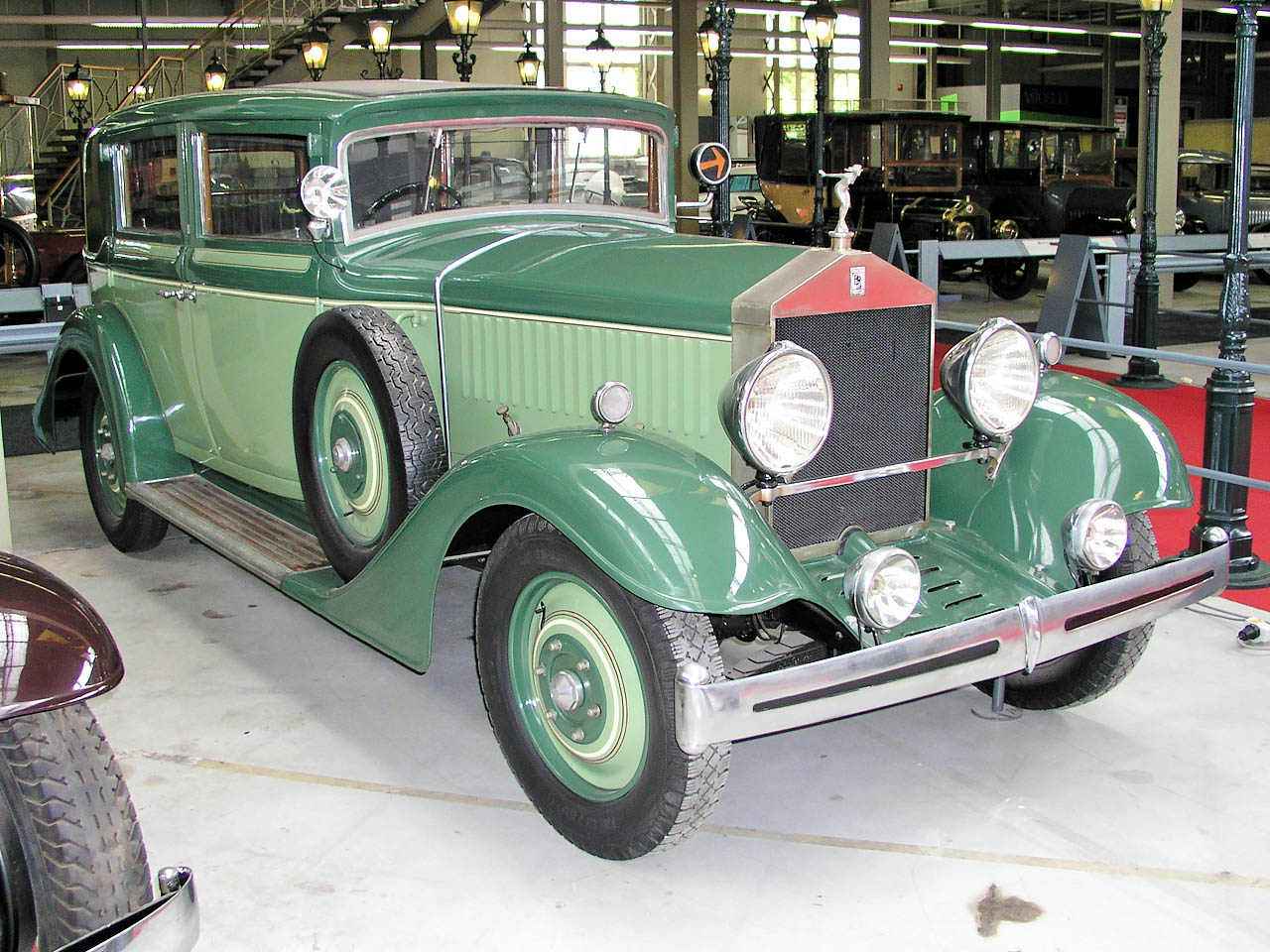
- 1934 Belga Rise 8C in AutoWorld in Brussels.
- Company type: Manufacturer
- Industry: Automobile
- Number of locations: Haren, Brussels

Belga Rise was a Belgian automobile manufacturer, based in Haren, Brussels, specializing in luxury cars.

The company produced cars from 1928 to 1935. Initially, it produced cars under license for the French firm Sizaire-Naudin.

Engines used included the 6-cylinder Hotchkiss AMBO and straight-8s by F. N., Minerva, Continental, and Talbot (Darracq). These engines were used with conventional 3-speed and Cotal 4-speed gearboxes. 35 cars were purchased by the Belgian Army for use as staff cars.
