= British Rail Class D3/5 =

Type and origin
- Power type: Diesel-electric
- Builder: British Railways’ Darlington Works
- Build date: 1955
- Total produced: 15
Specifications
- Configuration
  - Whyte: 0-6-0 DE
  - UIC: C
- Gauge: 4 ft 8 1/2 in (1,435 mm) standard gauge
- Wheel diameter: 4 ft 6 in (1.372 m)
- Loco weight: 47 long tons (48 t; 53 short tons)
- Prime mover: Lister-Blackstone ER6T
- Traction motors: British Thomson-Houston, 2 off
- MU working: Not fitted
- Train heating: None
- Train brakes: Vacuum
Performance figures
- Maximum speed: 20 mph (32 km/h)
- Power output: Engine: 350 bhp (261 kW)
- Tractive effort: 35,000 lbf (155.7 kN)
Career
- Operators: British Railways
- Class: DEJ6; later D3/5; later 3/1D; no TOPS class
- Numbers: 13152–13166; later D3152–D3166
- Axle load class: Route availability
- Retired: 1967
- Disposition: All scrapped

British Rail Class D3/5 was a shunting locomotive built by British Rail at their Darlington Works in England. It was a diesel powered locomotive in the pre-TOPS period and the class was numbered 13152–13166 (later renumbered D3152-D3166).

They were similar to Class D3/4 (TOPS Class 10, numbers 13137–13151 / D3137–D3151), but had electrical equipment from British Thomson-Houston rather than GEC. All fifteen locomotives were withdrawn between February and December 1967.

== Specification ==
- Wheel arrangement: 0-6-0 shunter
- Introduced: 1955
- Builder: British Railways
- Engine: Blackstone ER6T of 350 bhp (261 kW)
- Transmission:
  - Electric, British Thomson-Houston (Class D3/5)
  - Electric, General Electric Company plc (Class D3/4)

== See also ==
- List of British Rail classes

== Sources ==
- Ian Allan ABC of British Railways Locomotives. Winter 1962–1963.
