= Blackstone & Co =

Agricultural engineering firm

Blackstone & Co Ltd
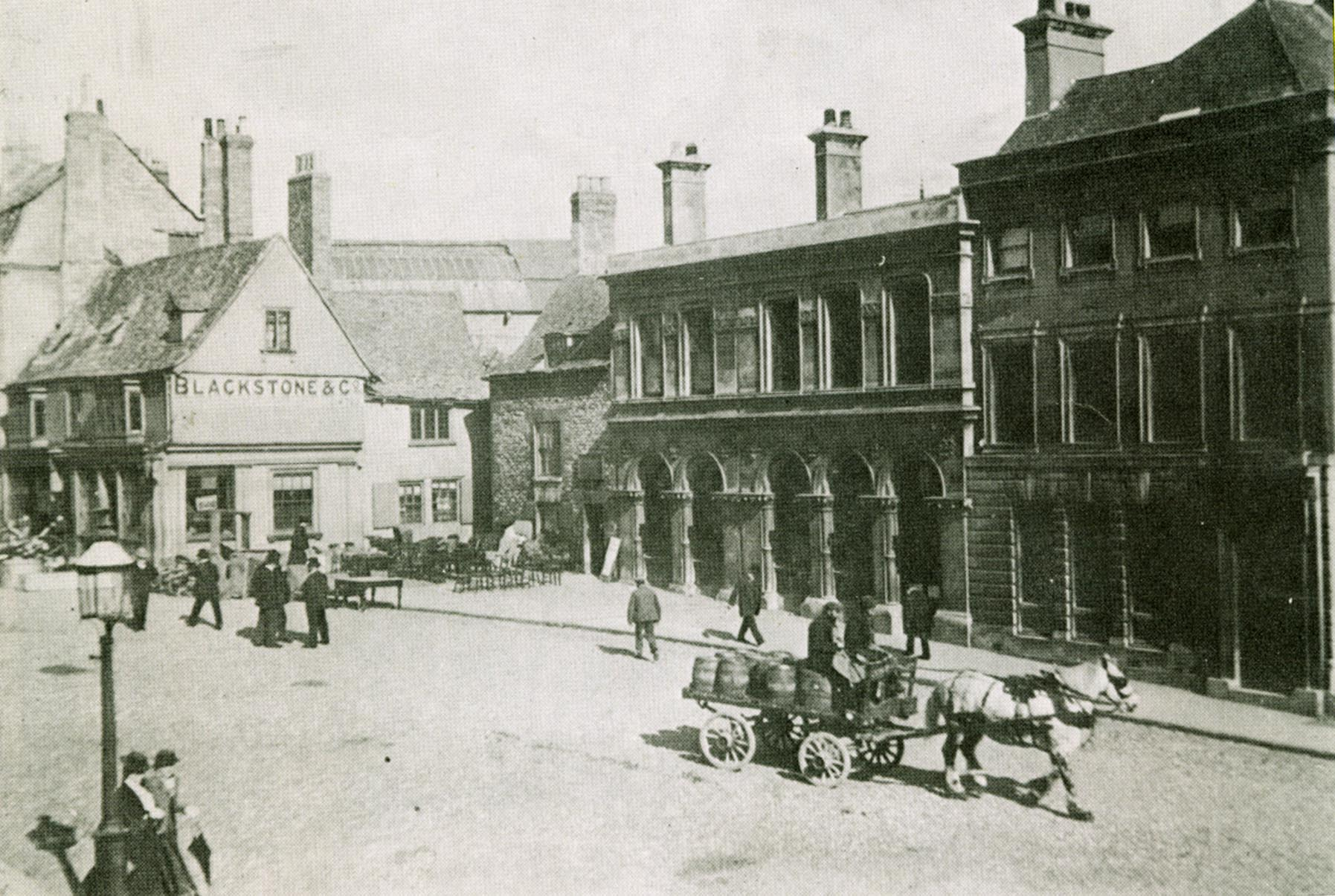
- Blackstones original company building Broad Street, Stamford
- Industry: Agricultural engineering, diesel engines
- Predecessor: Rutland Ironworks
- Founded: 29 January 1889
- Founder: Edward Christopher Blackstone
- Fate: Sold to MAN SE
- Successor: Mirrlees Blackstone
- Headquarters: Blackstones, Ryhall Road, Stamford, Lincolnshire, Stamford, England
- Key people: Edward Christopher Blackstone; Thomas Ashby
- Products: Diesel engines
- Parent: Lister; Hawker Siddeley; MAN Diesel

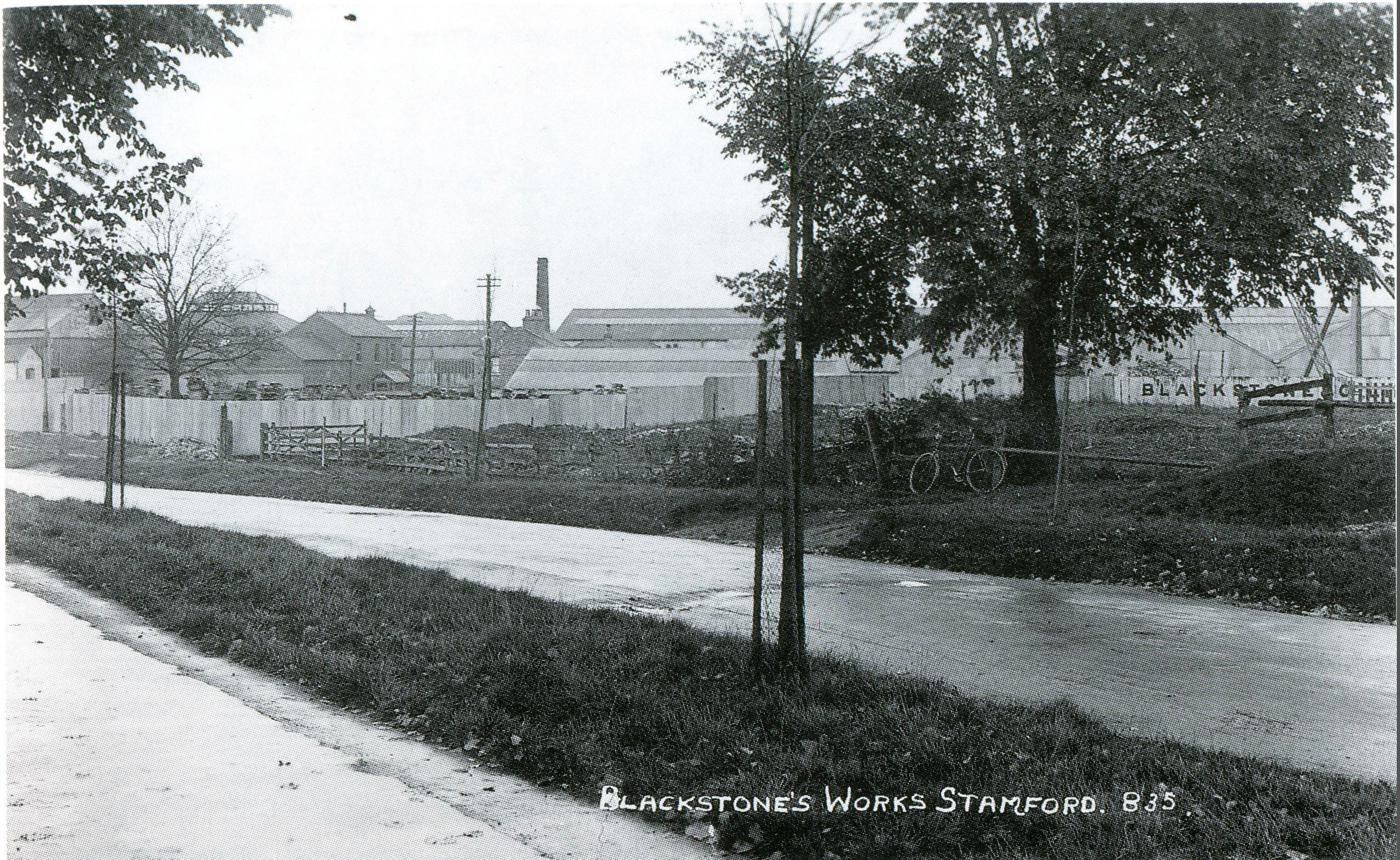
Blackstones Works, Ryhall Road, Stamford

Blackstone & Co. was a farm implement maker at Stamford, Lincolnshire, United Kingdom.

== History ==
=== Company History ===
This business was established in 1837 as Smith & Ashby later known as Rutland Iron Works. Later still it came into the ownership of Ashby and G. E. Jeffery. In 1877 Edward Christopher Blackstone (1850-1916) was admitted to a new partnership owning Rutland Iron Works known as Jeffery and Blackstone. Blackstone and George Mills, a member of Blackstone's wife's family, bought out Jeffery in 1882. A limited liability company, Blackstone & Co Limited, was incorporated on 29 January 1889 to take ownership of the business.

In 1895/1896 the Carter Brothers (Frank and Evershed) of Billingshurst joined the company. They had developed their 'Reliance' oil engine in 1894, and Blackstone started producing the engine in 1896. Frank Carter became works manager in 1904 where he remained until his death in 1934.

Following E. C. Blackstone's death in late 1916 the business was sold to a new combine, Agricultural & General Engineers (AGE) group, but retained its identity and management. Blackstone shareholders were paid with new AGE shares. Their former business continued to prosper but the profits went to support unprofitable members of the new combine. AGE turned out to be a failure from start to finish and had to be liquidated following its financial collapse in 1932. AGE shares proved worthless.

Three of E. C. Blackstone's sons managed to buy back Blackstone's from the liquidator with the support of an unidentified investor. An agreement had been reached with Massey-Harris of Canada to supply them all Blackstone's agricultural machinery marked with the brand name Massey-Harris-Blackstone.

In the middle of 1936 ownership of Blackstone's was taken by R A Lister & Co Limited. Blackstone's factory remained in Stamford, Lincolnshire

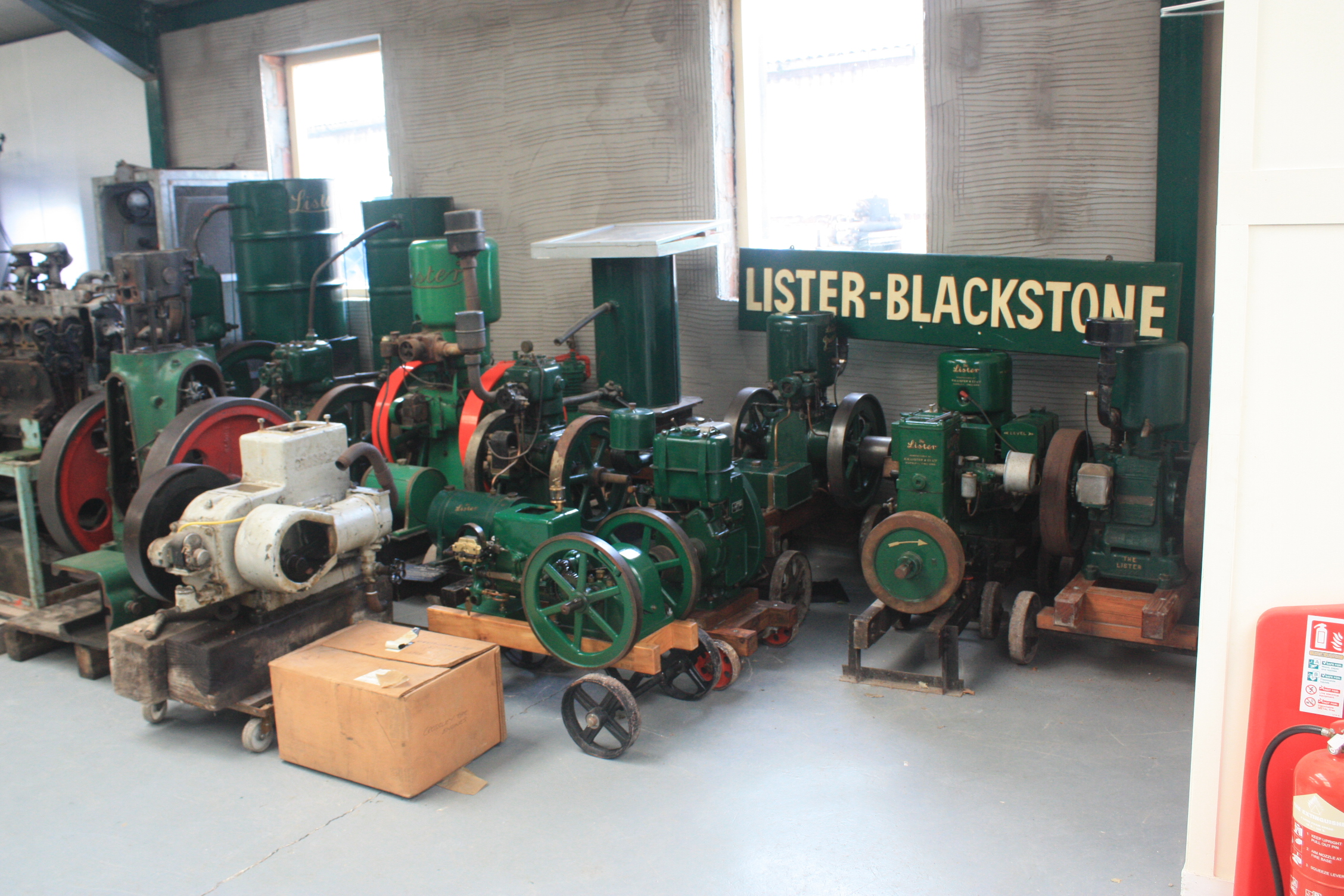
Lister Blackstone sign at the Anson Engine Museum with a collection of engines

AGE collapsed in 1932, after which Blackstone & Co. continued as an engine builder and was taken over by R A Lister and Company in 1937 to form Lister Blackstone.

=== Associated British Oil Engine Company ===
The Associated British Oil Engine Company (ABOE) was a British engineering company. In 1945 Mirrlees, Bickerton and Day joined the group.

=== Hawker Siddeley ===
R A Lister & Company was taken over by the Hawker Siddeley Group in 1965 and, in a later re-organisation, Lister became Lister Petter and Blackstone became Mirrlees Blackstone.

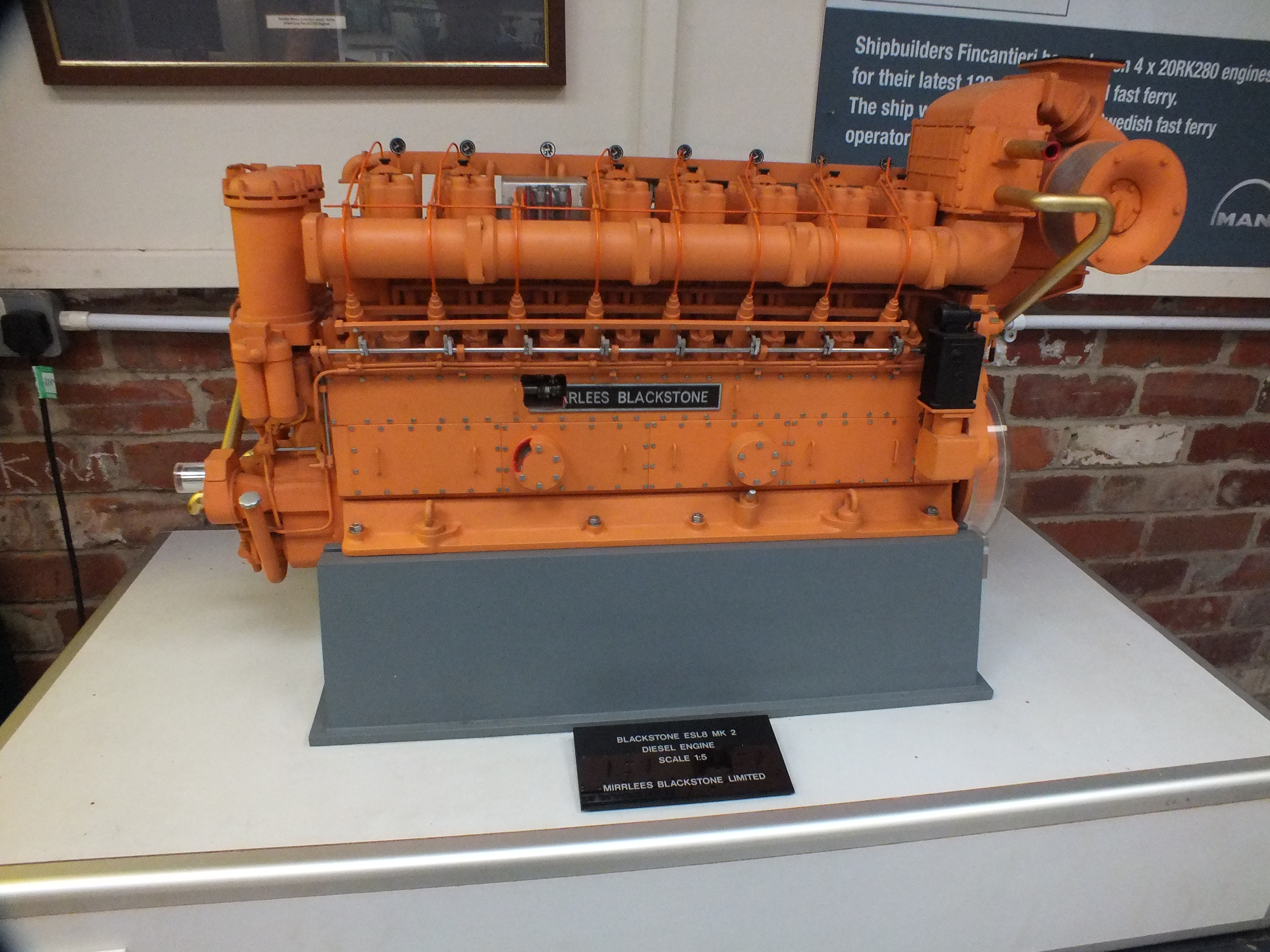
Scale model of a Mirrlees Blackstone ESL8 Mk 2 diesel engine at Anson

Mirrlees Blackstone Limited was formed on 1 June 1969 by the merger of Mirrlees National Limited (formerly Mirrlees, Bickerton and Day) and Blackstone & Company.

=== Alsthom ===
In 1988, General Electric Company plc merged its Paxman (engines), Ruston and Mirrlees Blackstone diesels businesses with the Alsthom division of Compagnie Générale d'Electricité (CGE) to form GEC-Alsthom. In 2000, Alstom sold its diesel engine businesses (Ruston, Paxman, and Mirrlees Blackstone) to MAN Group.

=== Closure ===
Mirrlees Blackstone was bought by MAN Diesel, along with the diesel businesses of the collapsed GEC, although little remains. The Stockport factory has been partly demolished and replaced with a new office and warehouse facility which still serves the aftermarket for spares and servicing of Lister Blackstone engines under the MAN Diesel & Turbo brand. The Blackstone name lives on with Blackstones F.C., a football club in Stamford.

== Products ==
In 1929 AGE advertised the following Blackstone products:

Engines: oil engines for small and large powers, horizontal and vertical, paraffin engines, petrol engines.
Unchokeable pumps (these were bought by Sigmund Pumps of Gateshead, who called them 'SB' (Sigmund-Blackstone) and were then passed to Sigmund Pulsometer Pumps, Reading after the Gateshead factory was sold to Ingersoll Rand), corn crushing and grinding mills, lighting sets.
Hay and straw elevators, horse rakes, land rollers, side rakes, swath turners, turnip cutters.

=== Engines ===
In 1896 they started building the lamp start oil engine after the developers of the engine (Frank and Evershed Carter of Carter Brothers, Billingshurt) joined the company with Frank Carter becoming works manager in 1904. In early 1897 the engine was described as Blackstone's oil engine, Carter's patent, but by September this had changed to "Blackstone's Patent Oil Engine". This was produced in large numbers and became a key product for the company - at the time of Frank Carter's death in 1934 there were over 100,000 of these engines in all parts of the world.

In 1912 they developed a new internal combustion engine that ran on vaporising oil and was fired by a spark. It did not need a hot bulb like most engines of the time. By 1919 they had mounted a 25 hp 3-cylinder version in a crawler tractor, which they built till 1925. In 1921 they made a narrow gauge petrol rail locomotive using the same 3-cylinder 25hp engine. This was a 3 to 4 ton locomotive (depending on the gauge required), and was marketed by James & Frederick Howard - who started making their own locomotives in 1923.

By 1929 they were building diesel engines for the Agricultural & General Engineers (AGE) group. Richard Garrett & Sons assembled some of these tractors. They were similar to an International 15/30.

== Products ==
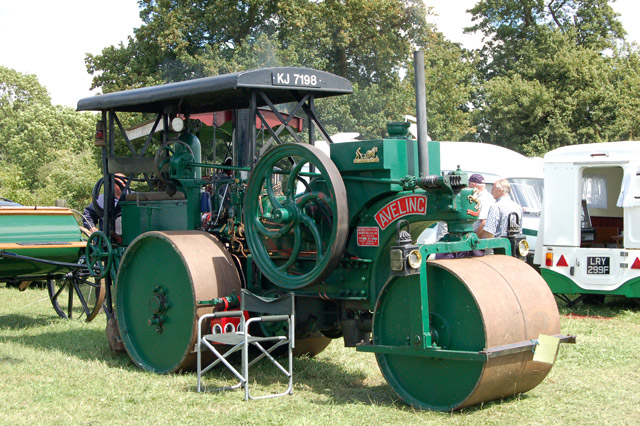
A 1932 Aveling and Porter Road Roller type DC, fitted with a single-cylinder Blackstone engine

- Diesel engines
- Marine diesel engines
- Shell casing during First World War
- Stationary engine
- Farming Equipment and engines for tractors
- Potato digger
- Swath Turner and Collector

== British Rail products ==
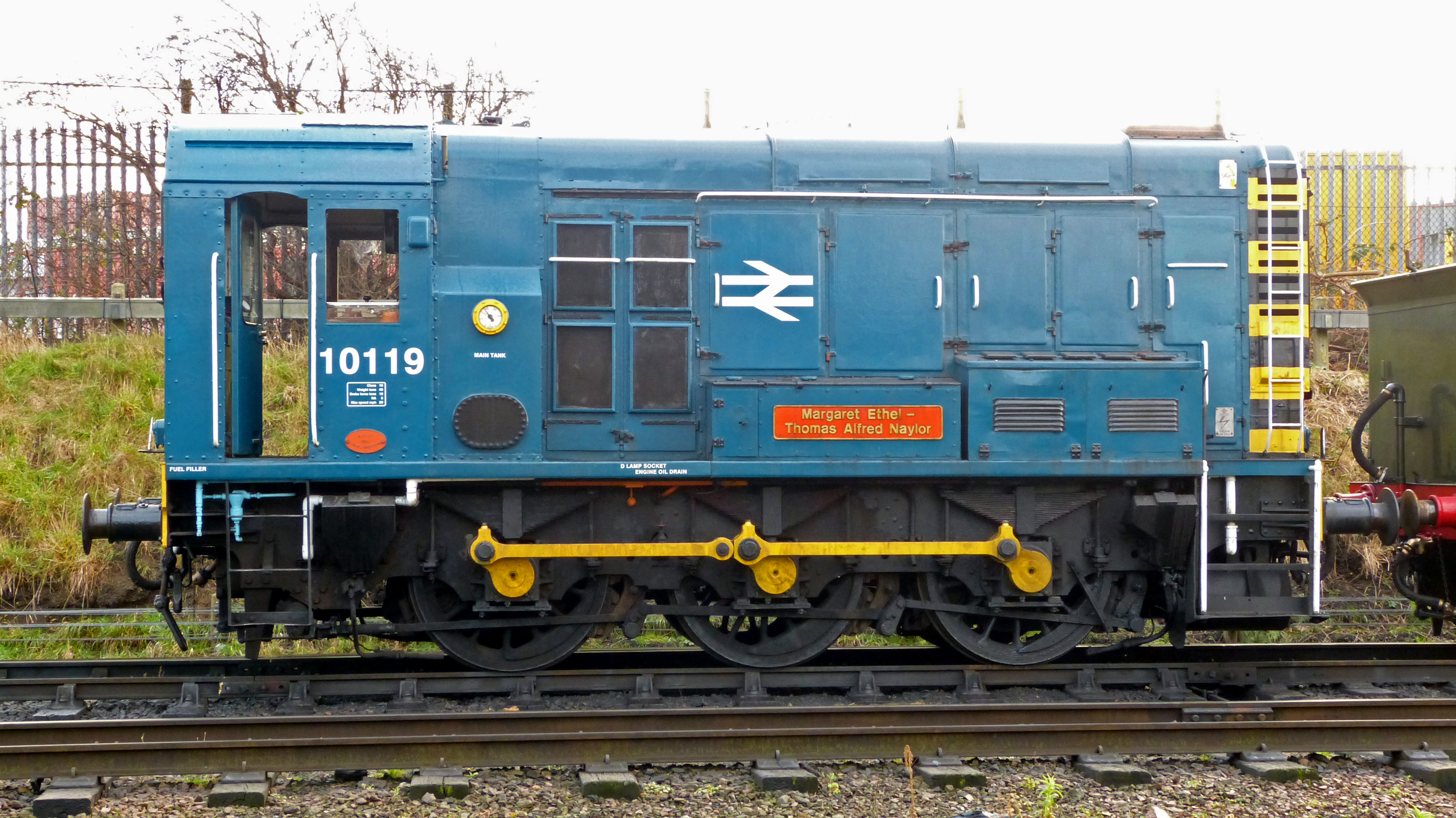
A British Rail Class 10 diesel locomotive, fitted with a Blackstone diesel engine.

Blackstone supplied a number of diesel engines for British Rail locomotives but these were largely unsuccessful and were not adopted.

- In the 1980s, four of the well-established Paxman Valenta-engined HST trainset power cars were re-engined with Mirrlees Blackstone MB190 engines for trials. These were unsuccessful and Valenta engines were reinstalled. Eventually, in the 2000s, the fleet was re-engined with MTU V16 4000 engines.
- The handful of British Rail Class D3/5 used the Blackstone ER6T
- The Class 10 was a small number (150 vs 900) of the widespread Class 08 0-6-0 diesel-electric shunter, in which a Blackstone ER6T engine was fitted instead of an English Electric 6KT. They were withdrawn early.
- Class 30 Type 2 locomotives were built with a Mirrlees Blackstone JVS12T but all were rebuilt as the Class 31 with the English Electric 12SVT, as also used in the Class 37.
- The projected Type 3 freight Class 38 of the 1980s was considered for use of a Mirrlees MB275T. Four of the refurbished Class 37/9 at this period were rebuilt with the engine as a trial, two more used the Ruston RK270T as a comparison. In the end, Class 38 was cancelled in favour of Class 60.
- Class 60 heavy freight Type 5 locomotives of the 1980s replaced the projected Class 38. Like the 38, these used the Mirrlees MB275T engine. (Contract of 109 MB275 engines received by Mirrlees). These 8 cylinder engines, compared to the more common V12 or V16 engines in this power range, were hoped to show lower operating costs owing to their simplicity.

As of February 2025, fifteen locomotives with Mirrlees Blackstone engines (fourteen Class 60s and one Class 37/9) remain in mainline operation.

The Stamford East railway station serviced the companies works.

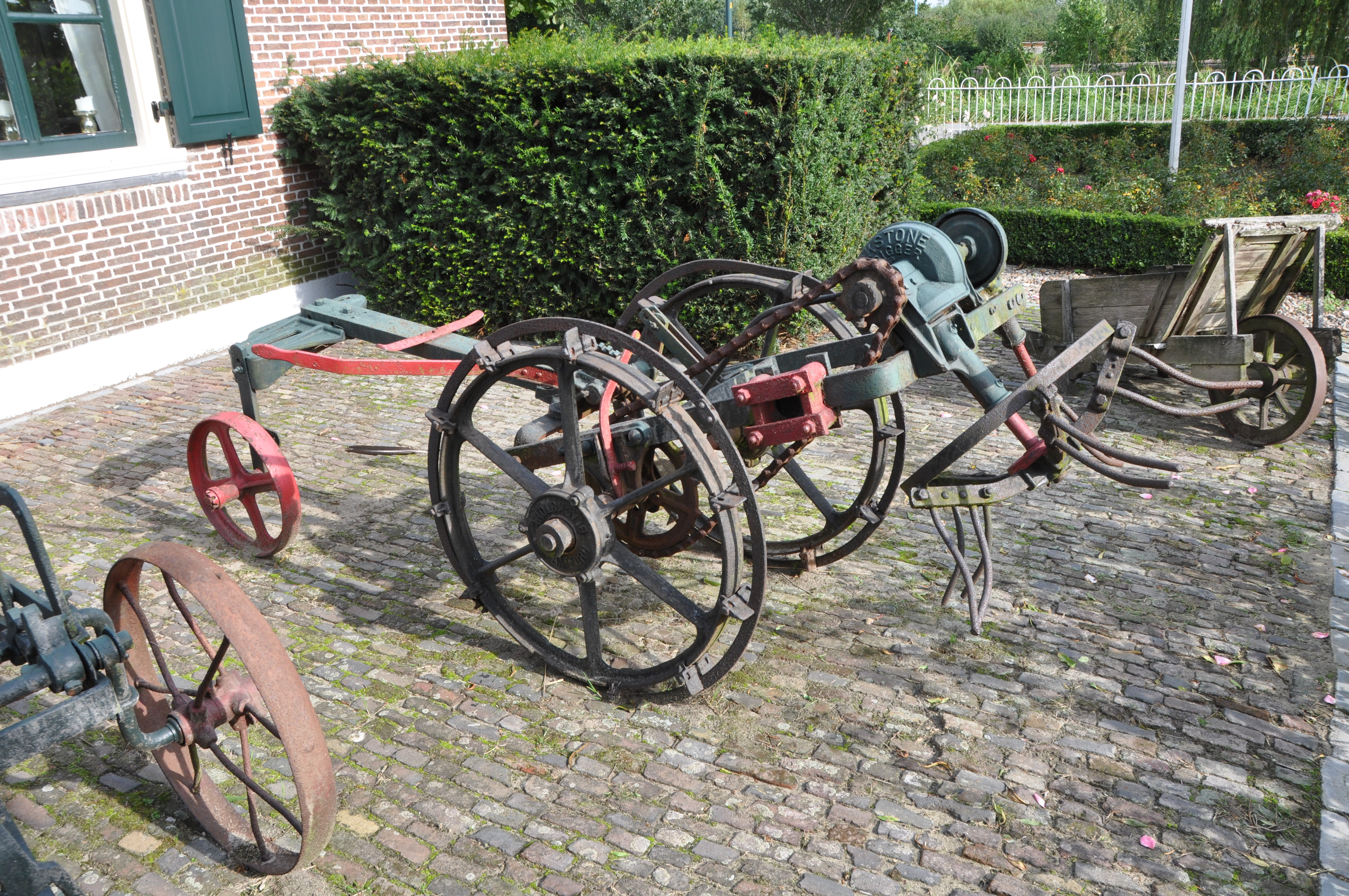
Blackstone potato digger

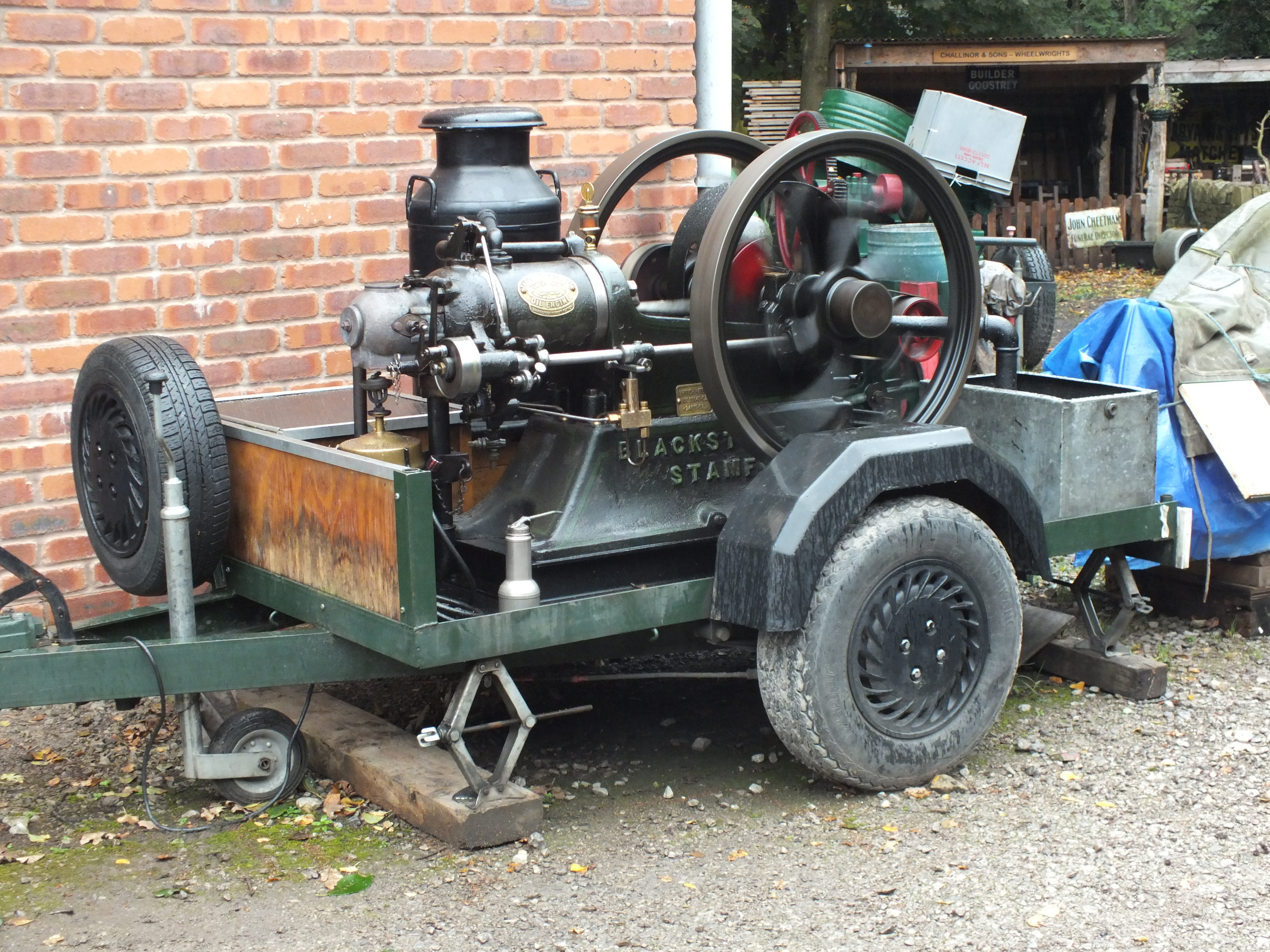
The Anson Engine Museum in Poynton, Cheshire collection. Blackstone oil engine

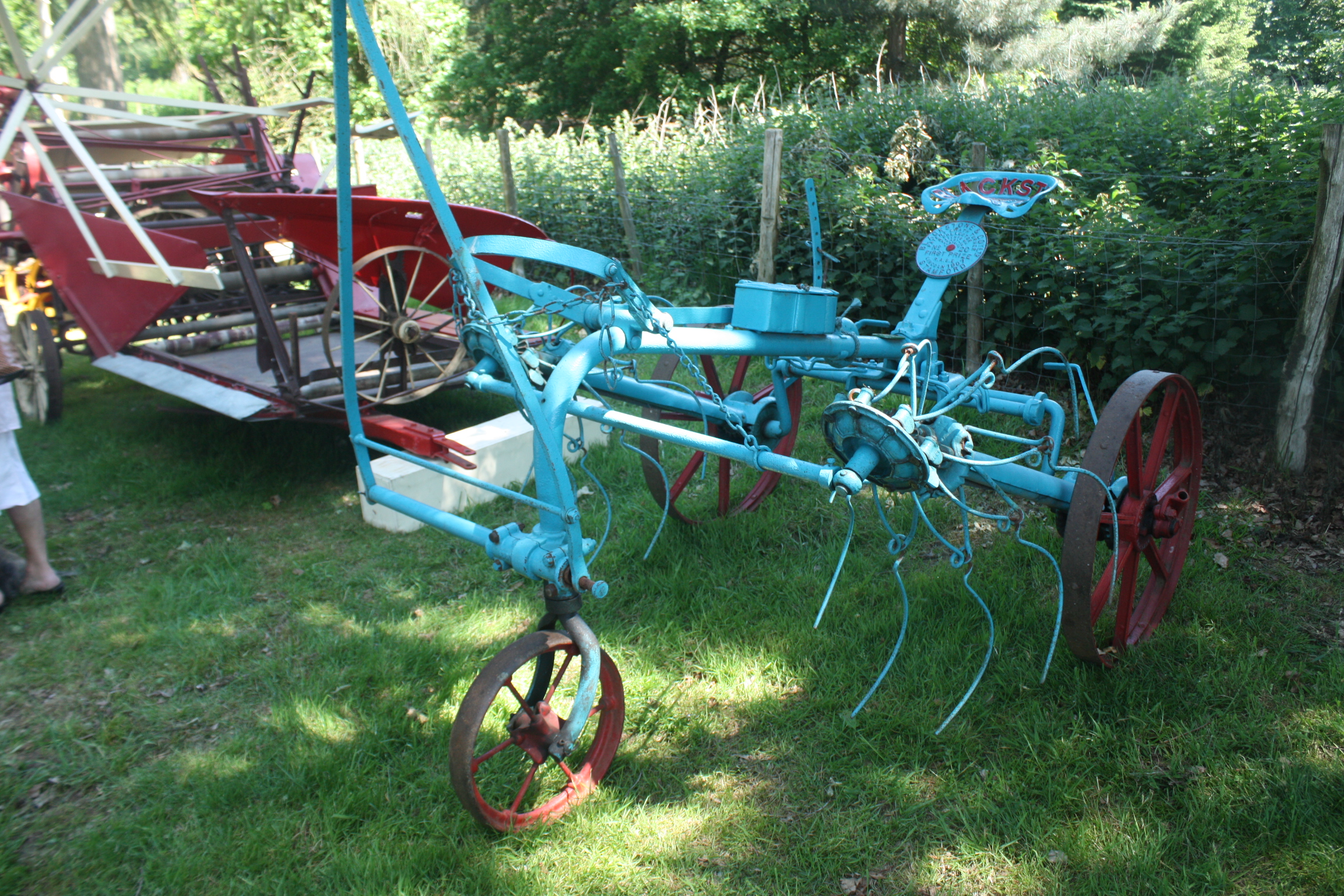
A restored Blackstone Swath Turner and Collector No. 2C (a.k.a. kicker, tedder) at Woolpit Steam Rally 2009, Suffolk, England; a reaper-binder partly visible on the left

Examples of Blackstone engines can be seen at the Anson Engine Museum near Manchester. The former Stamford Museum in Stamford, Lincolnshire, also had a Blackstone engine on display and held an archive relating to the company.

== Previous employees ==
- John (Jack) Henry Pick, who was the founder of The Pick Motor Company, previously worked for Blackstones.
- Harry Watson (OBE), managing director, Mirrlees Blackstone (Stockport) Ltd; managing director, Mirrlees Blackstone (Stamford) Ltd. He was mentioned in The Queen 1991 Birthday Honours list.
- Ian Summerfield (ISIAC), engine build foreman

== See also ==
- Blackstones F.C.
