= The Pick Motor Company =

Former British automobile manufacturer

The Pick Motor Company Limited of Stamford, Lincolnshire was a British motor vehicle manufacturer that flourished between 1899 and 1925. It also traded briefly under the name New Pick Motor Company.

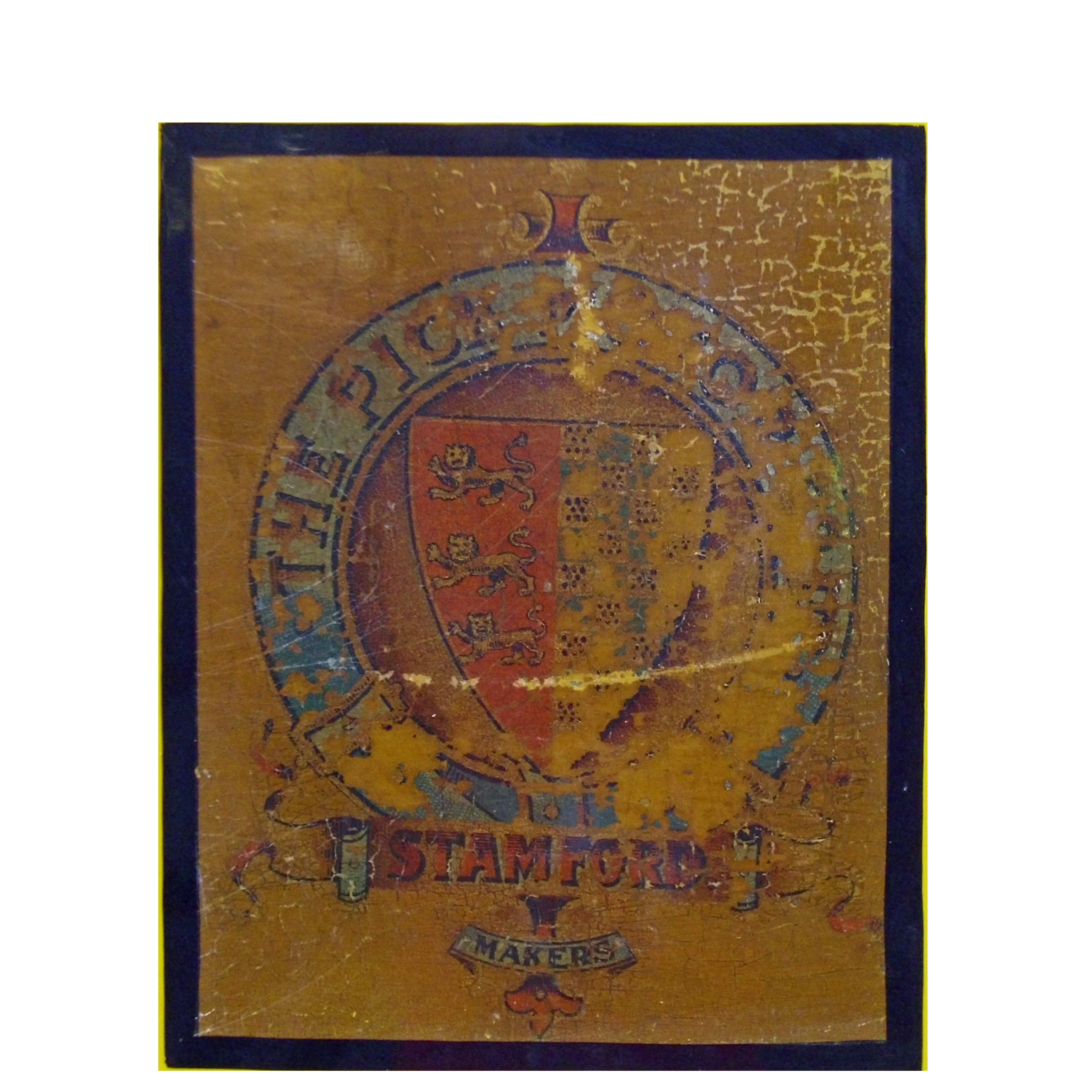
Emblem of the Pick Motor Company including the arms of Stamford

== Origin ==
Founder John (Jack) Henry Pick (1857–1954) was a blacksmith. He had experience of working with Blackstone & Co, a Stamford farm implement maker which had begun to make oil engines. Jack Pick became a bicycle dealer before he started to make cars in 1898.

== Vehicles ==
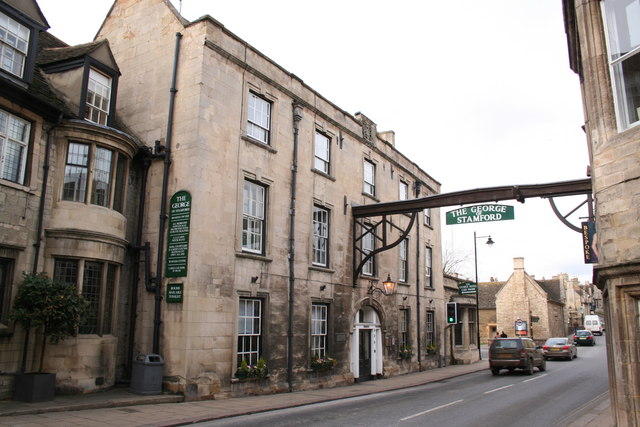
The George Hotel with its gallows sign over the road, Pick was in the building facing the hotel

included:

- 1898 dogcart
- 1900 rear-engined 2-seater
- 1901 4 hp front-engined (as illustrated)
- 1903 6 hp 2-cylinder boxer engine (as illustrated)
- 1903 10 hp 2-cylinder 1432 c.c. (as illustrated)
- 1908 12/14 hp 4-cylinder 2957 c.c.
- 1909 14/16 hp with either 2532 c.c. or 3232 c.c.
- 1912 16/18 hp 3601 c.c.
- 1913 20 hp 3601 c.c.
- 1923 22½ hp 3601 c.c.

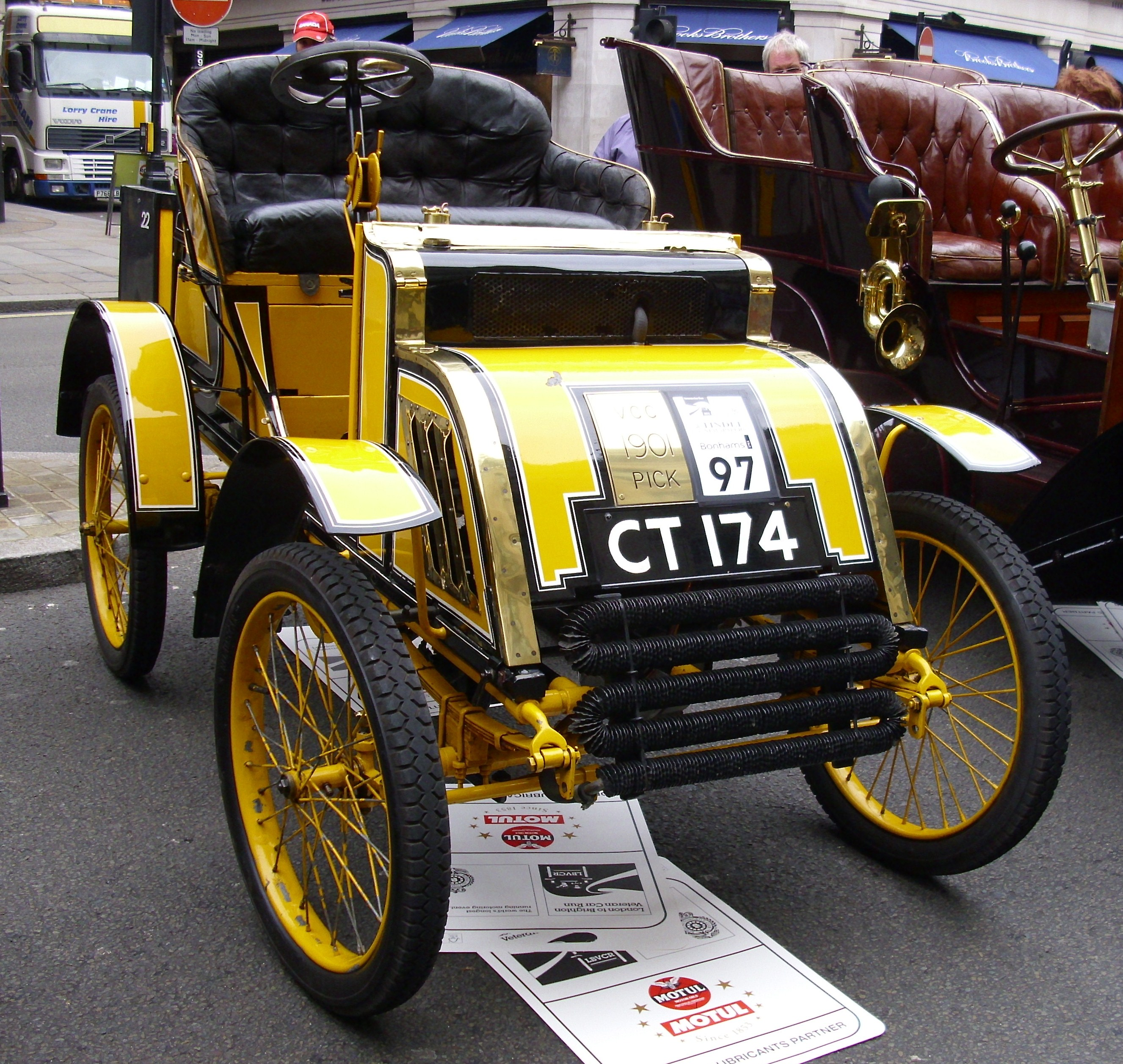
1901 4 hp Two-seater Voiturette

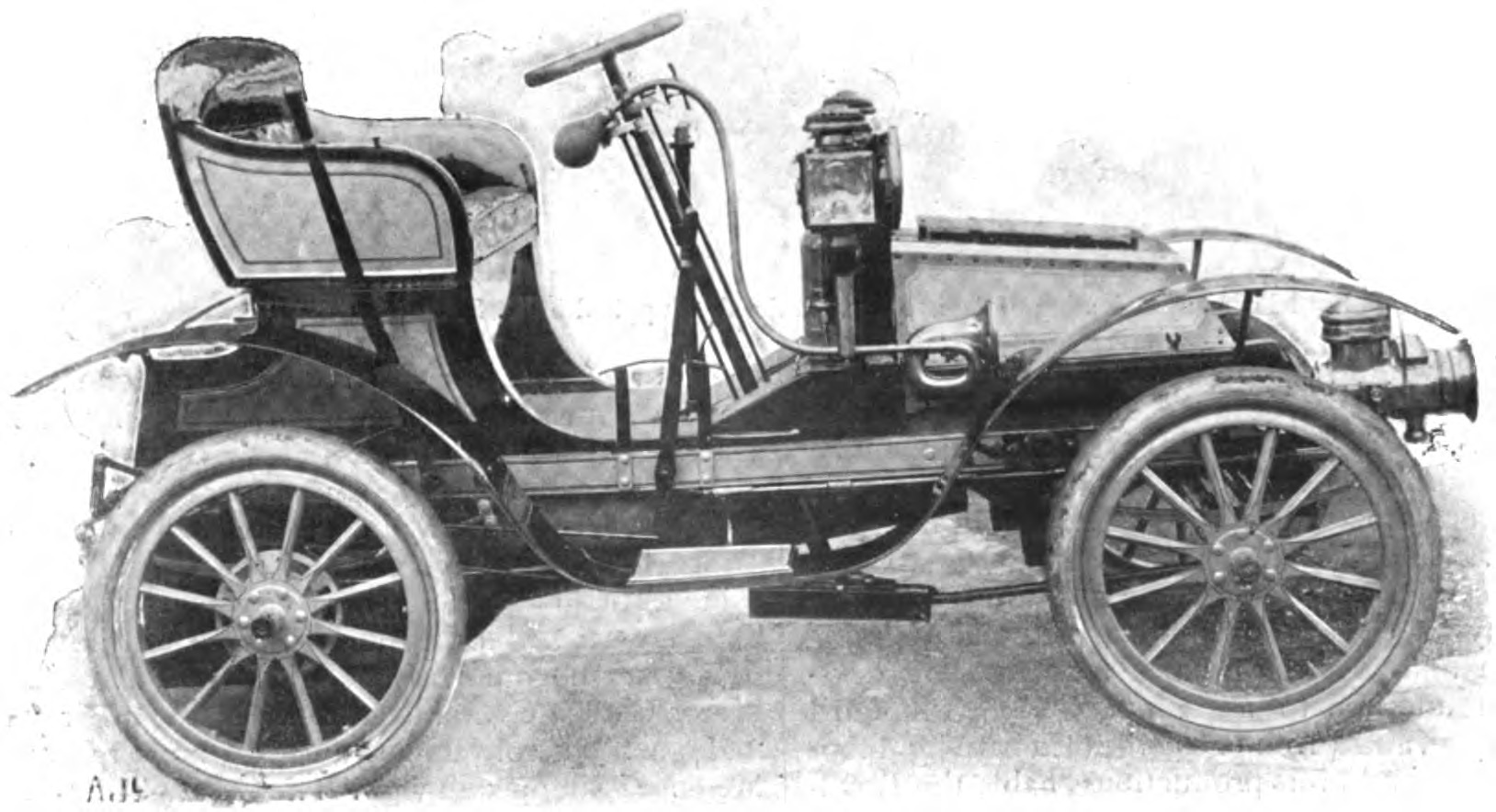
1903 6 hp voiturette with balanced horizontal engine transmission by enclosed belts or available with gear type transmission by Renold silent chain to the change gear and by roller chain to a live axle

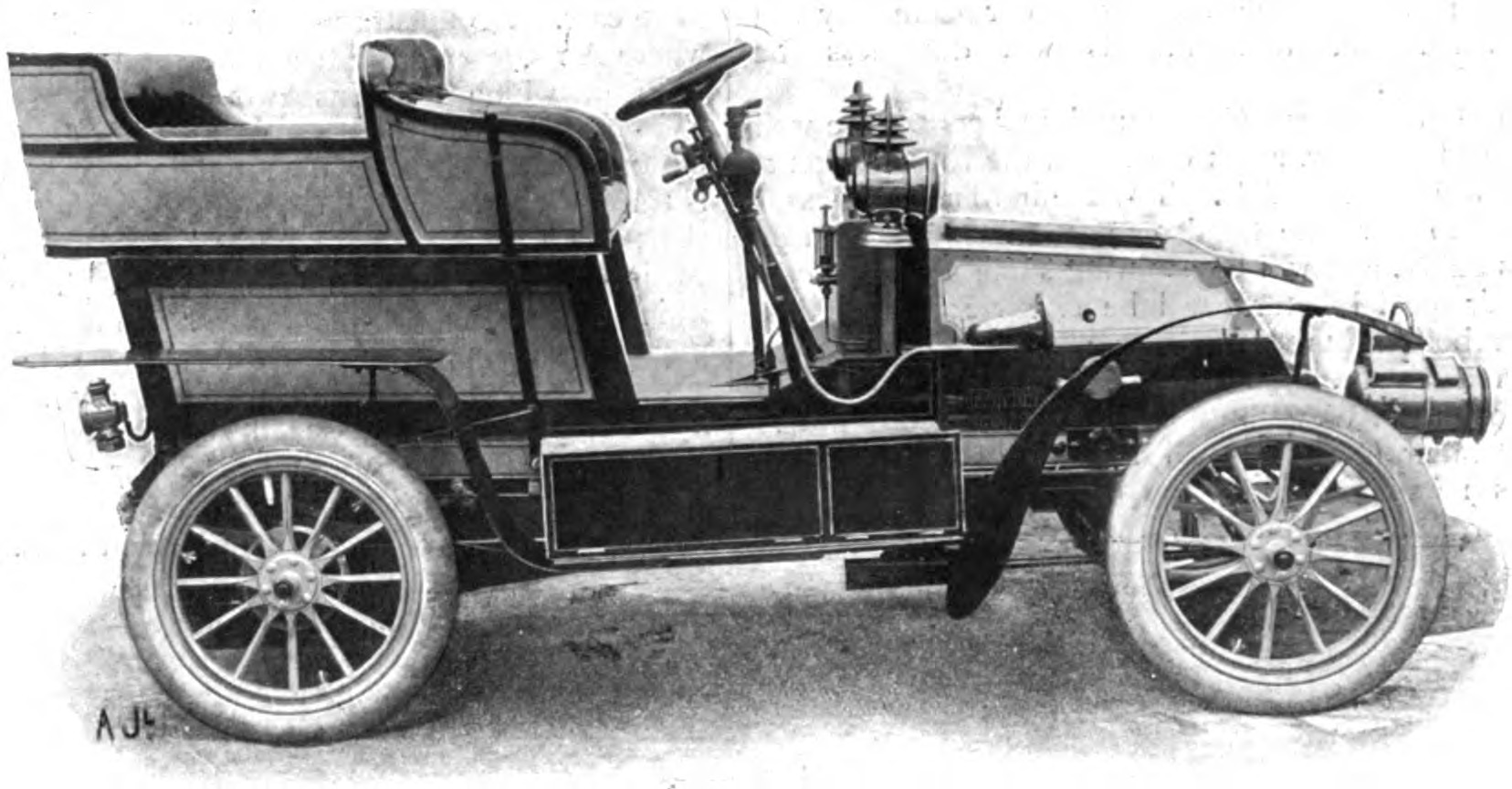
1903 10 hp voiturette with balanced horizontal engine transmission by enclosed belts or available with gear type transmission by Renold silent chain to the change gear and by roller chain to a live axle

== Premises ==
A factory was built in Blackfriars Street in the centre of Stamford in 1903 but disagreements with investors led to its sale to a printing firm. A new works was established on High Street St Martin's Stamford. Built in one of Britain's most elegant Georgian streets it was a former coachmaker's shop vacated by Pick & Co in 1925.

By the end of the 20th century, St Martin's Garage is now an antiques centre.

== Exports ==
Pick cars are known to exist in Australia and there are records of six surviving cars in New Zealand.

== Greengrocer ==
After closing the motor business Pick traded as a greengrocer from 11 High Street where he had also once made cars.

== National news item, National Insurance — pay and conditions ==
A MOTOR FIRM'S ACTION
The following notice has been posted in the works at Stamford of the New Pick Motor Company:—
"On account of the Insurance Act coming into force on July 15, 1912, we are compelled to alter the hours of work from 54 to 55¼ hours per week; 2½ per cent. will be deducted from piecework prices. It is not possible to raise the price of our cars, owing to foreign competition, and to the fact of raw materials being much higher. This leaves the profit so small that it is impossible for us to pay the insurance without taking the above measure. The above to commence on July 15, 1912."
The Times, Thursday, Jun 27, 1912; pg. 10; Issue 39936

== See also ==
- Pick of Stamford: History of the Pick Motor Company by Michael Key, Paul Watkins Publishing, Stamford, 1994 ISBN 1871615534
