= 1911 Indianapolis 500 =

American motor race

1st Indianapolis 500
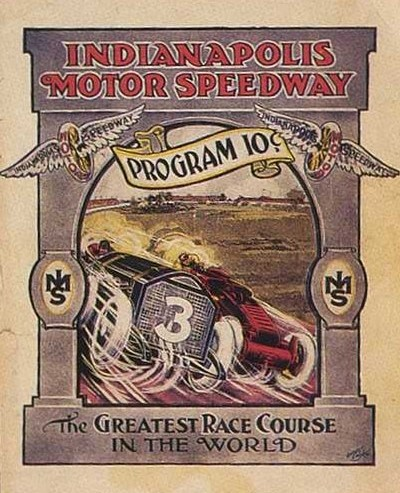

Indianapolis Motor Speedway

Indianapolis 500
- Sanctioning body: AAA
- Date: May 30, 1911
- Winner: Ray Harroun
- Winning Entrant: Nordyke & Marmon Company
- Winning Chief Mechanic: Harry Goetz
- Winning time: 6:42:08
- Average speed: 74.602 mph (120.060 km/h)
- Pole position: Lewis Strang
- Pole speed: N/A
- Most laps led: Ray Harroun (88)

Pre-race
- Pace car: Stoddard-Dayton
- Pace car driver: Carl G. Fisher
- Starter: Fred J. Wagner
- Honorary referee: R. P. Hooper
- Estimated attendance: 85,000

Chronology
Previous	Next
1909-1910 events	1912

The 1911 International 500-Mile Sweepstakes Race was held at the Indianapolis Motor Speedway on Tuesday, May 30, 1911. It was the inaugural running of the Indianapolis 500, which is one of the most prestigious automobile races in the world. Ray Harroun, an engineer with the Marmon Motor Car Company, came out of retirement to drive, and won the inaugural event before re-retiring for good in the winner's circle.

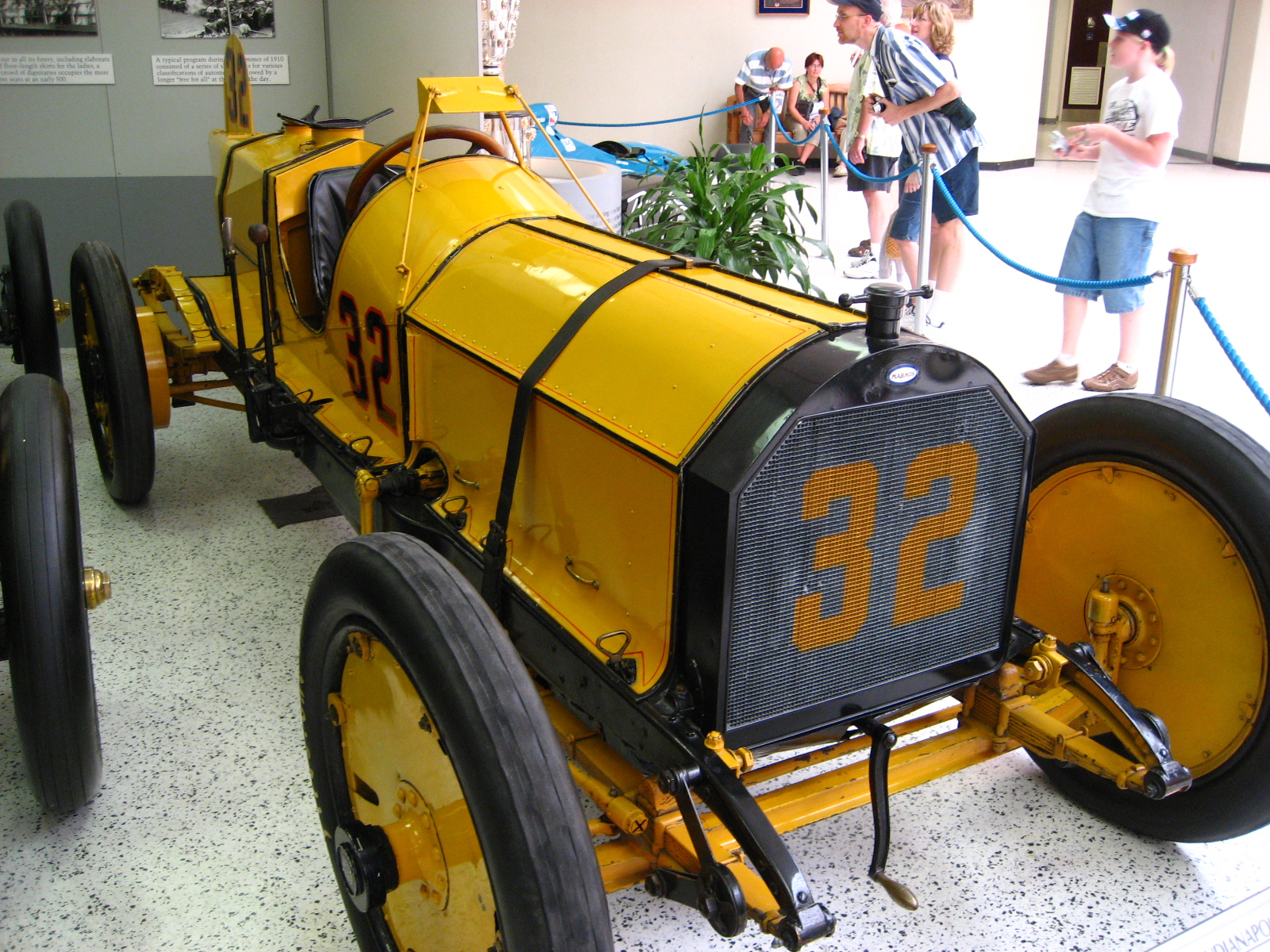
The Marmon Wasp, the car that won the 1911 Indianapolis 500.

Over the previous two seasons (1909 and 1910), the Speedway had scheduled numerous smaller races during a series of meets over the two years. In a departure from that policy, for 1911 the management decided to instead schedule a single, large-scale event attracting widespread attention from both American and European racing teams and manufacturers. It proved to be a successful event, immediately establishing itself as both the premier motorsports competition in the U.S. and one of the most prestigious in the world.

The race was sanctioned by the AAA Contest Board, and was part of the 1911 season of races. In an era of two-man cars – consisting of a driver accompanied by a riding mechanic – Ray Harroun famously drove the race solo. In the days leading up to the race, fellow competitors complained about Harroun's ability to see other cars around him at speed (that duty was typically performed by the riding mechanic). In an effort to assuage the concerns, Harroun famously affixed a rearview mirror to his machine. It is believed to be the first rearview mirror mounted on a racing car, although Harroun himself claimed he got the idea from seeing a mirror used for a similar purpose on a horse-drawn vehicle in 1904. Harroun also claimed that the mirror vibrated constantly due to the rough brick surface, and it was rendered largely useless. Nevertheless, Harroun led 88 laps (of 200), running near the front nearly all day. He executed a preplanned strategy of driving a steady 75 mph pace to reduce his tire wear. Around the halfway mark, he was briefly relieved by Cyrus Patschke for approximately 35 laps, but got back into the car, and drove to victory by a margin of approximately 1 minute and 42 seconds.

The marathon race was completed in 6 hours and 42 minutes in front of a crowd of over 85,000 spectators. A total of twelve cars completed the 500-mile distance, while 12 of the 40 cars dropped out due to crashes or mechanical failures. One participant, Sam Dickson (the riding mechanic for Arthur Greiner) was fatally injured after a crash on lap 12.

== One Race ==
=== "Too much racing" ===
The 1910 racing season at Indianapolis Motor Speedway began well, with an estimated 60,000 spectators for the 200 mi (320 km) Wheeler-Schebler Trophy on Memorial Day, won by Ray Harroun. Throughout the remainder of the season, however, the crowds grew progressively smaller, and after seeing a second decline in attendance in as many days for Labor Day, September 5, 1910, the final day of the concluding meet, Speedway co-founders Carl Fisher, James Allison, Arthur Newby and Frank Wheeler conferred to decide on a new course for the following year.

While the appearance on Monday of some 18,000 was reasonable enough, given both the rain showers occurring early that morning and the large parade held downtown during the afternoon, neither the two days of the Labor Day meet nor the July 4 weekend races had come near to equaling the Memorial Day turnout. While potential explanations for the decline included the high heat of summer and the women of the city making family holiday plans that did not include automobile racing, one of the most likely, they reasoned, was an overabundance of the very events they exhibited: too many races had diluted turnout down to only those most interested in the sport.

=== Timing ===
By the next day, Tuesday, September 6, 1910, local newspapers had already heard rumors of the decision, and reported that the four partners would likely soon choose to concentrate on a singular, major event for 1911. Most strongly considered were either a 24-hour contest — anticipating the 24 Hours of Le Mans, itself inaugurated 12 years later — or a 1,000 mi (1,600 km) endurance race, with a purse of $25,000; equivalent to 37.615 kg (82.93 lb) of pure gold, and more than high enough to attract global as well as national and regional competition. The endurance event was favored by several manufacturers, but debate soon proceeded as to what would be most beneficial to the spectators as well as the participants. While a 24-hour race would be possible on a technical level despite its extreme nature, all agreed that potential ticket-buyers would inevitably depart the grounds well before its conclusion. The management decided that the ideal "race window" would be from 10 a.m. local time until late afternoon. This would allow spectators adequate time to arrive before the start, stay for the entire race, and return home before sundown. To fit in that timeframe, that translated to a race distance of 300 to 500 miles (480 to 800 km). With total purse estimates ranging upwards of $30,000, the race winner could expect to take home as much as $12,000, the equivalent of over $400,000 in 2026 dollars.

In choices for a specific date to hold the race, Memorial Day, already the occasion of the largest previous attendance, was always foremost. The Independence Day (July 4) date was rejected, as numerous other events such as parades, picnics, and other celebrations already captured the attention of would-be spectators. Scheduling the race on a Saturday (of a non-holiday weekend) during the summer was also eschewed, since many people – especially in the farming business – worked on Saturdays. Business associate Lem Trotter informed the Speedway owners that Memorial Day coincided with the completion of a late-spring agricultural practice known as "haying," after which the farmers acquired an effective two-week break. While the intention, Trotter argued, would certainly be to draw from far more than just the local farming community, simple business sense called for as little interference as possible with the regional economy. That such an opportunity to avoid a conflict of interest fell on a major national holiday sealed the decision: within two days, formal announcement was made of a 500-mile (800 km), marathon-distance motor race, to be held at the Indianapolis Motor Speedway, May 30, 1911.

=== Preparation, and the "Month of May" ===
As desired and expected, news of a contest of such distance evoked enthusiasm both within and without the motorsport community. Newspaper and trade magazine articles used superlatives for the challenges expected to soon face both drivers and engineers.

Due to the publicity thus created, Speedway management, which had for the previous two seasons of meets charged the effectively nominal entry fee of one dollar per mile of scheduled race distances, took measures to ensure that the likely large entry list did not include any that were frivolous: at an accordingly heightened fee of $500 per car, participation became a nominally risky proposition to teams and manufacturers, since, although the high finishers were due to receive record purse money and accessory prizes, no money at all was offered to finishers below tenth place. Interest, however, was far from dampened, with entry blanks distributed over the course of the following month quickly returning filled, the first of which being an automobile built by the J. I. Case Threshing Machine Company of Racine, Wisconsin, to be driven by Lewis Strang. By May 1, 1911, the final day for entry filing, a high total of some 46 cars had been nominated to compete.

May 1 also marked the beginning of a long tradition of the opening of the Speedway, on the first day of the month of the race, to free practice on the circuit during daylight hours by any and all participants. A policy originally established so as to allow teams unfamiliar with the 2.5-mile (4.0 km), recently brick-paved high-speed course as much time to acclimate as necessary, the "Month of May", as it came to be called in future years, ultimately proved most advantageous in the short-term to the locally based teams, given that many of the entries from abroad did not even set out for the city until well into the month. One such example, the double-entry Pope-Hartford team based in Springfield, Massachusetts, came by way of the team's actual racing cars themselves simply being driven cross-country, while loaded up with toolboxes and as many spare parts as they could hold, making overnight stops in New York City, Buffalo, Cleveland and Columbus, Ohio, before finally arriving, where they were duly met at the city's East Washington Street by Frank Fox, who was not only the slated driver of one of the two cars but also the company's local agent.

Ultimately, of the full forty-six entries originally submitted, only the two cars of the Falcar team from Moline, Illinois failed to appear, due to an inability to acquire critical chassis pieces.

=== Setting the field ===
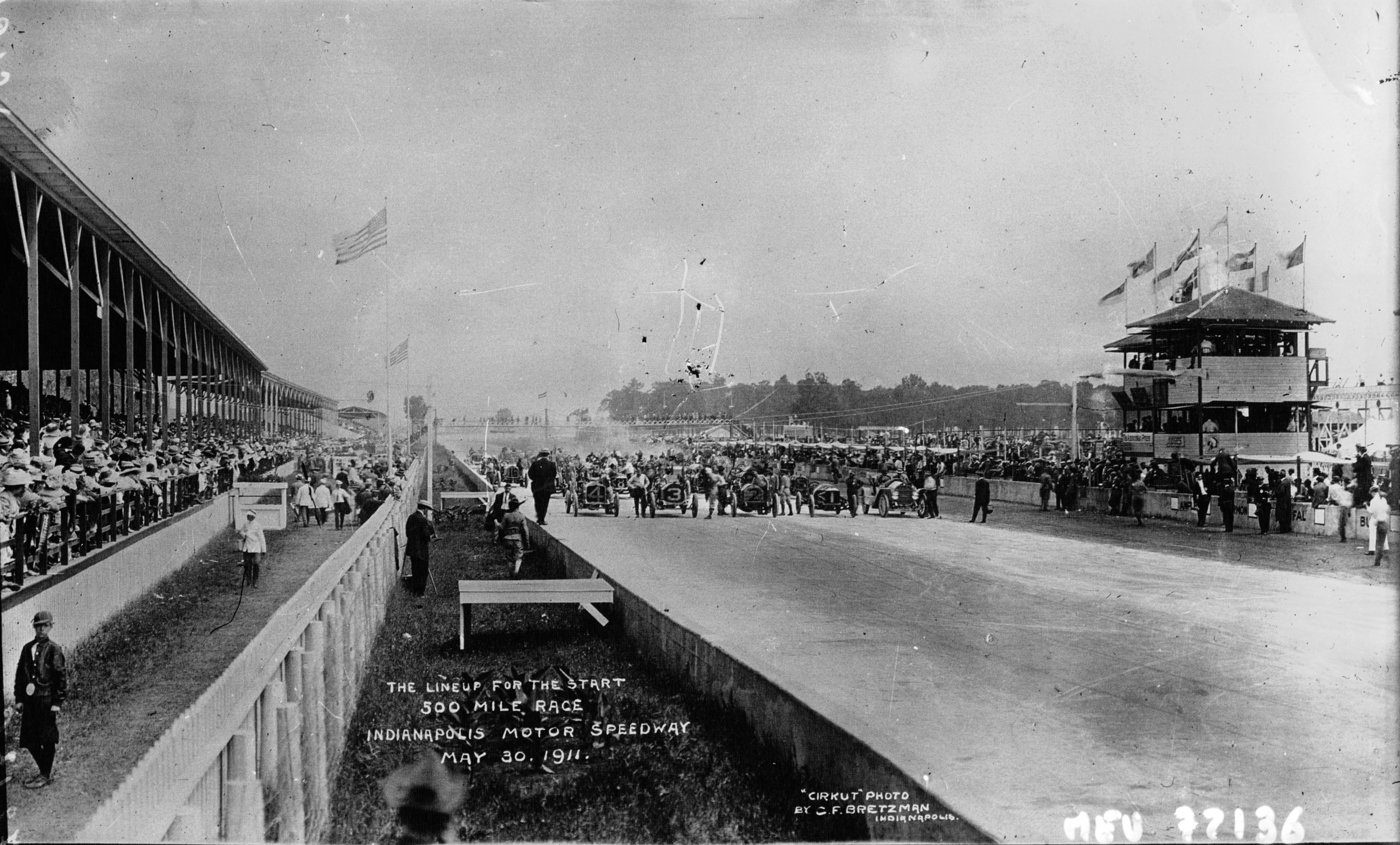
Starting grid on race morning.

To further refine the entry list as the date of the race approached, a qualification system was implemented whereby each car would be required to demonstrate a sufficiently competitive pace. With several of the top entries having already recorded, during the "unofficial" practice time of the month, complete laps at up to 88 mph (142 km/h), a minimum required speed of 75 mph (121 km/h), based on a flying start over a 0.25 miles (0.40 km) section of the main straightaway, was considered to be within reason. Thus, all cars successfully completing an officially-timed run of the quarter-mile distance at or under 12 seconds would be accepted into the starting field; those that did not would be given two additional attempts before being rejected, a policy that began the tradition of three qualification attempts allotted to each entered car.

In the years following these inaugural qualification sessions, which were held on May 27 and 28, 1911, anecdotes would occasionally arise, and thereafter be steadily embellished in their retelling, regarding the purported qualifying times and speeds of given competitors, and how they compared to one another. In reality, no records of the sessions were kept at all, let alone publicized, with the sole objective being the confirmation of each car's capability to achieve the minimum speed. Also in contrast to later eras, both the starting order and the car numbering of the participants were determined not by respective speeds or previous seasonal point totals, but by entry date, with the Strang-driven Case entry being assigned #1 in the first starting position.

== The 500-mile race ==
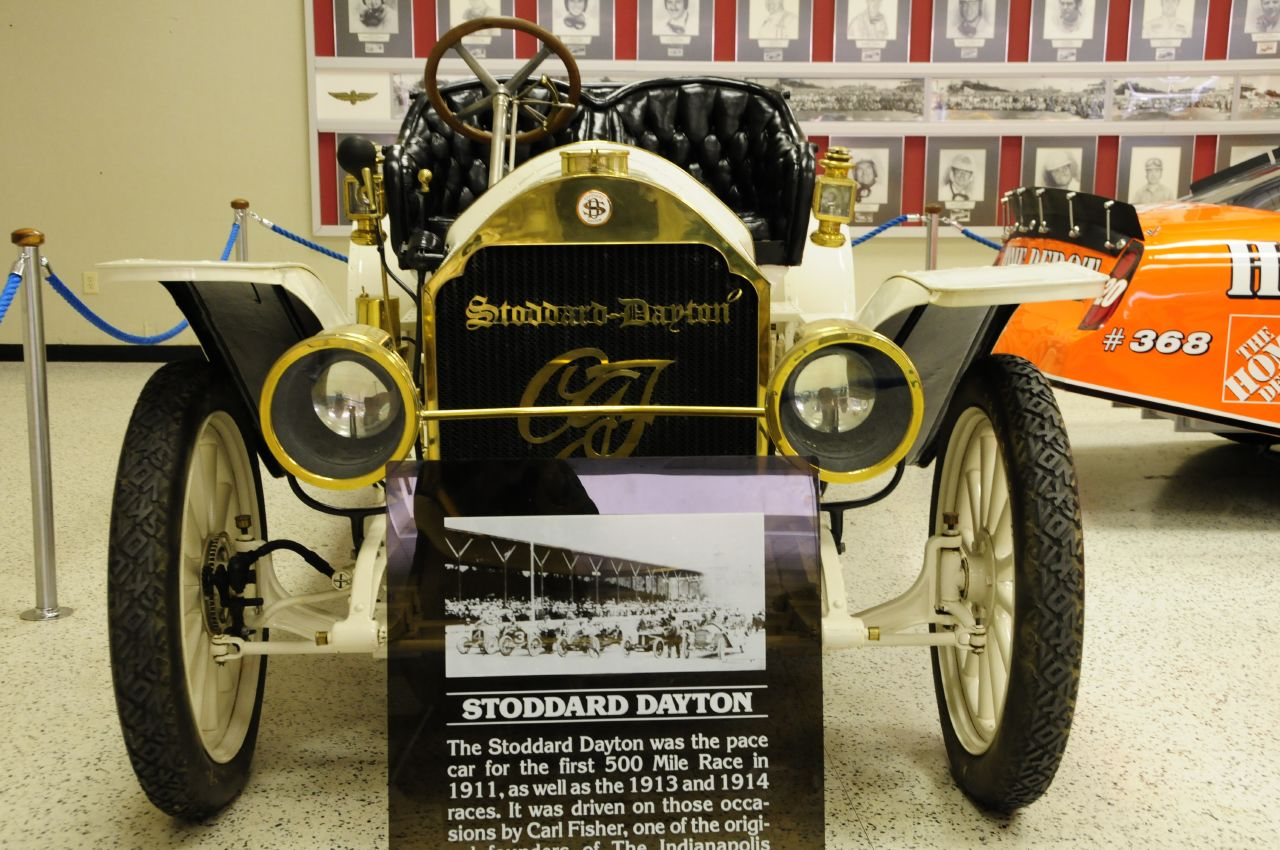
The 1911 Stoddard-Dayton pace car on display at the Indianapolis Motor Speedway Hall of Fame Museum.

The largest racing purse offered to date, $27,550, drew 46 entries from the United States and Europe, from which 40 qualified by sustaining 75 mph (121 km/h) along the quarter mile-long main straight. Grid positions were determined by date of filing of official entry forms, rather than speed, a difference from the contemporary European practice of lottery. Entries were prescribed by rules to have a minimum weight of 2,300 lb (1,043 kg) and a maximum engine size of 600 cubic inches (9.83 litres) displacement.

The 40 cars lined up five to a row, except for the first and last. In the first row, the Stoddard-Dayton pace car was situated on the inside (driven by IMS owner Carl Fisher), with four competitors cars rounding out the row. Rows 2-8 had five cars each, while the final row had only one car in it. Fisher's use of the Stoddard-Dayton is believed to constitute the first use of such a vehicle, for the first known mass rolling start of an automobile race. At some point before the race, Bert Adams was denied a license by the AAA Contest Board - Adams was replaced as driver of the McFarlan by his riding mechanic, Mel Marquette.

Amid roiling smoke, the roar of the 40 machines' engines, and the waving of a red flag which signaled 'clear course ahead', American Johnny Aitken, in a National, took the lead from the fourth starting spot on the extreme outside of the first row, and held it until lap 5 when Spencer Wishart took over in a Mercedes, himself soon overtaken by David Bruce-Brown's Fiat which would go on to dominate the first half of the race. On lap 12 tragedy would strike as Sam Dickson (the riding mechanic for Arthur Greiner) was the first person killed in history during the Indianapolis 500. One of the front wheels came off the American Simplex car Greiner was driving, causing him to lose control and both men to be thrown from the car. While Greiner escaped with a broken arm, Dickson flew into a fence 20 feet (6.1 m) from the car. Reports state that Dickson was killed instantly, although the crowd evidently swarmed around the body, requiring the state militia who were acting as security at the event to use their guns as clubs to clear a path for the attending doctors. Nearing the halfway point, Ray Harroun, an engineer for the Marmon-Nordyke company and defending AAA national champion, and the only driver competing without a riding mechanic due to his first-ever-recorded use of a cowl-mounted rear-view mirror, passed Bruce-Brown for the lead in his self-designed, six-cylinder "Marmon Wasp" (so named for its distinctively sharp-pointed, wasp-like tail).

Others faltered during the marathon event, 14 cars fell out of the race.

Harroun, relieved by Cyrus Patschke for 35 laps (87.5 miles / 140.82 km), led 88 of the 200 laps, the most among the race's seven leaders, for a race-average speed of 74.602 mph (120.060 km/h) in a total time of 6:42:08 for the 500-mile (804.67 km) distance to win. During the midpoint of the second half of the race, Harroun and Lozier driver Ralph Mulford had fought an intense duel, with Harroun holding a small advantage near the 340 mile (550 kilometer) mark, whereupon one of the Wasp's tires failed. Harroun's forced stop allowed Mulford to move to the front, before Mulford also pitted for new rubber. After Mulford came back onto the track, Harroun was scored in the lead with a 1-minute 48 second advantage, and victory.

After the race, and collection of $10,000 for first place, Harroun returned to the position he had taken at the end of the 1910 racing season: retirement. He would never race again.

=== Controversy ===
Upon Harroun's declared victory, second-place finisher Mulford supposedly protested, contending he had lapped Harroun when the Marmon limped in on the torn tire, an argument appearing plausible to some, due to an accident disrupting the official timing and scoring stand at nearly the same time. However, race officials were quick to note Mulford's subsequent pit stop forced the Lozier crew to spend several minutes themselves changing a tire which stuck to the wheel hub; Mulford's protest was thus denied.

According to track historian Donald Davidson, no protests were filed at the end of the race and Mulford offered congratulations to Harroun in the Detroit Free Press newspaper on June 4. Davidson has also pointed out that Mulford was reported by contemporary publications to have changed 14 tires during the course of the race, including one from a blown tire in turn one. Changing tires at the time was a lengthy and painstaking process, as the wheels were typically not removable. Tires had to be pried off of the rims, remounted, and inflated - all using hand tools, and in the precarious confines of the primitive pit stalls. Mulford himself even understood and admitted that he lost at least 14 minutes of track position due to his numerous pit stops.

"[Mulford] expressed himself as more than satisfied with the outcome of the race and gives full credit to Ray Harroun and Cyrus Patschke for their great victory."

— Detroit Free Press; June 4, 1911

After blowing the tire on turn one, Mulford had to limp around the track for almost an entire lap, and subsequently bent the rim. That necessitated an even longer pit stop at that juncture to hammer out the damage. The accounts from the newspapers claim that Harroun changed only four tires all day during only three pit stops. Harroun's team changed the right rear tire three times, and one other unspecified tire. Harroun's shorter elapsed time in the pits is alone considered sufficient to more than overcome any track position advantage Mulford might have been thought to have. But the undermining evidence to support Harroun as the rightful winner was the team strategy to run a constant 75 mph pace, regardless of position, in order to save tire wear. During the 1910 Wheeler-Schebler Trophy Race, as well as during test runs in May 1911, Harroun discovered that by merely running a constant 75 mph pace instead of an 80 mph (or faster) pace, he would substantially reduce his tire wear and increase tire life.

Davidson contends that Mulford did not make serious claims to victory later in life, as some have suggested. And in fact the controversy itself did not begin to inflame until decades after the race. Likewise, internet-based urban legends, and a book published in 2011, have fueled the controversy. It is also possible that Mulford's statements in the Detroit Free Press interview were misunderstood or purposely misconstrued. While giving full credit to Harroun for winning the race, Mulford did for himself claim the world record for 500 miles driven solo (Harroun had relief help from Cyrus Patschke). He also made the largely inconsequential claim that minus the stoppage time needed for pit stops (over 14 minutes), he likely completed the 500 miles (running time only) in less elapsed time than Harroun & Patschke.

== Starting grid ==
Entries were required to maintain an excess of 75 mph (121 km/h) over a quarter-mile distance to qualify. However, the starting grid determined by order of entry date. No qualification times or speeds were recorded, only pass or fail.

Row	No.	Far Inside	No.	Inside Center	No.	Center	No.	Outside Center	No.	Far Outside
1	Pace Car Position		1	(United States) Lewis Strang	2	(United States) Ralph DePalma	3	(United States) Harry Endicott	4	(United States) Johnny Aitken
2	5	(United States) Louis Disbrow	6	(United States) Frank Fox	7	(United States) Harry Knight	8	(Austria-Hungary) Joe Jagersberger	9	(United States) Will Jones
3	10	(United States) Gil Andersen	11	(United States) Spencer Wishart	12	(Canada) W. H. Turner	15	(United States) Fred Belcher	16	(United States) Arthur Chevrolet
4	17	(United States) Charles Basle	18	(United States) Eddie Hearne	19	(United States) Harry Grant	20	(United States) Charlie Merz	21	(United States) Howdy Wilcox
5	23	(United States) Mel Marquette	24	(United States) Fred Ellis	25	(United States) Harry Cobe	26	(United States) Jack Tower	27	(United States) Ernest Delany
6	28	(United States) David Bruce-Brown	30	(United States) Lee Frayer	31	(United States) Joe Dawson	32	(United States) Ray Harroun	33	(United States) Ralph Mulford
7	34	(United States) Teddy Tetzlaff	35	(United States) Herbert Lytle	36	(United Kingdom) Hughie Hughes	37	(United States) Charles Bigelow	38	(United States) Ralph Beardsley
8	39	(United States) Caleb Bragg	41	(United States) Howard Hall	42	(United States) Bill Endicott	44	(United States) Arthur Greiner	45	(United States) Bob Burman
9	46	(United States) Billy Knipper								

Note: All drivers were R Indianapolis 500 Rookies

=== Failed to qualify ===
- (United States) Louis Edmunds
- (Australia) Rupert Jeffkins

== Box score ==
Pos	No.	Driver	Entrant	Chassis (car name)	Engine	Cyl	Displ (in^{3})	Grid	Laps	Status
1	32	(United States) Ray Harroun R (Cyrus Patschke)	Nordyke & Marmon Company	Marmon "Wasp"	Marmon	6	477	28	200	74.602 mph
2	33	(United States) Ralph Mulford R	Lozier Motor Company	Lozier	Lozier	4	544	29	200	+1:43
3	28	(United States) David Bruce-Brown R	E. E. Hewlett	Fiat S61	Fiat	4	589	25	200	+10:21
4	11	(United States) Spencer Wishart R (Dave Murphy)	Spencer Wishart	Mercedes	Mercedes	4	583	11	200	+10:49
5	31	(United States) Joe Dawson R (Cyrus Patschke)	Nordyke & Marmon Company	Marmon	Marmon	4	495	27	200	+12:26
6	2	(United States) Ralph DePalma R	Simplex Automobile Company	Simplex	Simplex	4	597	2	200	+19:54
7	20	(United States) Charlie Merz R (Len Zengel)	National Motor Vehicle Company	National	National	4	447	18	200	+24:12
8	12	(Canada) W. H. Turner R (Walter Jones)	American Simplex	Amplex	Amplex	4	443	12	200	+33:48
9	15	(United States) Fred Belcher R (John Coffey)	Knox Automobile Company	Knox	Knox	6	432	13	200	+35:01
10	25	(United States) Harry Cobe R (Louis Schwitzer)	Jackson Automobile Company	Jackson	Jackson	4	559	22	200	+39:42
11	10	(United States) Gil Andersen R	Ideal Motor Car Company	Stutz	Wisconsin	4	390	10	200	+40:47
12	36	(United Kingdom) Hughie Hughes R	Mercer Motors Company	Mercer	Mercer	4	300	32	200	+41:24
13	30	(United States) Lee Frayer R (Eddie Rickenbacker)	Columbus Buggy Company	Firestone-Columbus	Firestone-Columbus	4	432	26	197	Flagged
14	21	(United States) Howdy Wilcox R	National Motor Vehicle Company	National	National	4	589	19	194	Flagged
15	37	(United States) Charles Bigelow R (W. H. Frey) (E. H. Sherwood)	Mercer Motors Company	Mercer	Mercer	4	300	33	194	Flagged
16	3	(United States) Harry Endicott R	Inter-State Automobile Company	Inter-State	Inter-State	4	390	3	192	Flagged
17	41	(United States) Howard Hall R (Rupert Jeffkins)	Velie Motors Corporation	Velie	Velie	4	334	36	190	Flagged
18	46	(United States) Billy Knipper R	E. A. Moross	Benz	Benz	4	444	40	188	Flagged
19	45	(United States) Bob Burman R	E. A. Moross	Benz	Benz	4	520	39	183	Flagged
20	38	(United States) Ralph Beardsley R (Frank Goode)	American Simplex	Amplex	Amplex	4	597	34	178	Flagged
21	18	(United States) Eddie Hearne R (Edward Parker)	Edward A. Hearne	Fiat	Fiat	4	487	16	175	Flagged
22	6	(United States) Frank Fox R (Fred Clemons)	Pope Manufacturing Company	Pope-Hartford	Pope-Hartford	4	390	6	162	Flagged
23	27	(United States) Ernest Delany R	Clark-Carter Automobile Company	Cutting	Cutting	4	390	24	160	Flagged
24	26	(United States) Jack Tower R (Robert Evans)	Jackson Automobile Company	Jackson	Jackson	4	432	23	145	Flagged
25	23	(United States) Mel Marquette R	Speed Motors Company	McFarlan	McFarlan	6	377	20	142	Flagged
26	42	(United States) Bill Endicott R (John Jenkins)	Cole Motor Car Company	Cole	Cole	4	471	37	104	Flagged
27	4	(United States) Johnny Aitken R	National Motor Vehicle Company	National	National	4	589	4	125	Connecting rod
28	9	(United States) Will Jones R	Case Corporation	Case	Wisconsin	4	284	9	122	Steering
29	1	(United States) Lewis Strang R (Elmer Ray)	Case Corporation	Case	Wisconsin	4	284	1	109	Steering
30	7	(United States) Harry Knight R	Westcott Motor Car Company	Westcott	Westcott	6	421	7	90	Crash FS
31	8	(United States) Joe Jagersberger R	Case Corporation	Case	Wisconsin	4	284	8	87	Crash FS
32	35	(United States) Herbert Lytle R	Apperson Brothers Automotive Company	Apperson	Apperson	4	546	31	82	Crash in pits
33	19	(United States) Harry Grant R	American Locomotive Company	Alco	Alco	6	580	17	51	Bearings
34	17	(United States) Charles Basle R	Buick Motor Company	Buick	Buick	4	594	15	46	Mechanical
35	5	(United States) Louis Disbrow R	Pope Manufacturing Company	Pope-Hartford	Pope-Hartford	4	390	5	45	Crash FS
36	16	(United States) Arthur Chevrolet R	Buick Motor Company	Buick	Buick	4	594	14	30	Mechanical
37	39	(United States) Caleb Bragg R	Caleb S. Bragg	Fiat	Fiat	4	487	35	24	Crash in pits
38	24	(United States) Fred Ellis R	Jackson Automobile Company	Jackson	Jackson	4	355	21	22	Fire damage
39	34	(United States) Teddy Tetzlaff R	Lozier Motor Company	Lozier	Lozier	4	544	30	20	Crash FS
40	44	(United States) Arthur Greiner R	American Simplex	Amplex	Amplex	4	443	38	12	Crash T2

Note: Relief drivers in parentheses

R Indianapolis 500 Rookie

Total laps completed for finishing positions 13th through 26th are unofficial. Official laps counts were published only for cars that completed all 200 laps (500 miles), and for cars which dropped out. All other cars running at the finish were simply listed as "Flagged". Some accounts attribute this to a crash that occurred during the race which disrupted the timing and scoring stand for several minutes. Following the race, the scoring serials were reviewed and revised multiple times, then the scoring records were subsequently destroyed. In 1999, historian and statistician Phil Harms published a revised box score for the 1911 Indianapolis 500 at Motorsport.com which included lap counts for all cars. According to Harms, the lap totals for positions 13th–26th were "estimated based upon lap time charts".

=== Race statistics ===
Lap Leaders
Laps	Leader
1-4	Johnny Aitken
5-9	Spencer Wishart
10-13	Fred Belcher
14-19	David Bruce-Brown
20-23	Ralph DePalma
24-72	David Bruce-Brown
73-76	Johnny Aitken
77-102	David Bruce-Brown
103-137	Ray Harroun
138-142	Ralph Mulford
143-176	Ray Harroun
177-181	Ralph Mulford
182-200	Ray Harroun

Total laps led
Laps	Leader
Ray Harroun	88
David Bruce-Brown	81
Ralph Mulford	10
Johnny Aitken	8
Spencer Wishart	5
Fred Belcher	4
Ralph DePalma	4

== Statistics ==
Race field average engine displacement:

- 460 in^{3} / 7.54 L

Race field average qualifying speed:

- No full lap

Finishing entries average time and finishing speed:

- 7:05:27
- 70.74 mph / 113.85 km/h

== Notes ==
=== Works cited ===
- Jaslow, Russel (1997). "Who Really Won the First Indy 500?".
- 2006 Indianapolis 500 Official Program
- Summary of race at www.champcarstars.com

Indianapolis 500; Inaugural race	1911 Indianapolis 500; Ray Harroun	1912 Indianapolis 500; Joe Dawson
Preceded by Inaugural race	Record for the fastest average speed 74.602 mph	Succeeded by 78.719 mph (1912 Indianapolis 500)
