= Fred Belcher =

American racing driver (1881–1951)

- Born: Fred William Belcher; June 3, 1881 Chicopee, Massachusetts, U.S.
- Died: February 18, 1951 (aged 69) Springfield, Massachusetts, U.S.

Champ Car career
- 4 races run over 3 years
- First race: 1909 Vesper Club Trophy (Merrimack Valley)
- Last race: 1911 Indianapolis 500 (Indianapolis)
Wins	Podiums	Poles
0	0	0

Fred William Belcher (June 3, 1881 – February 18, 1951) was an American racing driver who competed in the inaugural Indianapolis 500, where he finished in thirteenth place.

== Motorsports career results ==
=== Indianapolis 500 results ===
Year	Car	Start	Qual	Rank	Finish	Laps	Led	Retired
1911	15	13	—	—	9	200	4	Running
Totals						200	4	

Starts	1
Poles	0
Front Row	0
Wins	0
Top 5	0
Top 10	1
Retired	0
