= Fred Ellis (racing driver) =

American racing driver (1881–1954)

- Born: Fred Woodworth Ellis; January 28, 1881 Carlisle, Michigan, U.S.
- Died: November 9, 1954 (aged 73) Nebo, Missouri, U.S.

Champ Car career
- 4 races run over 3 years
- First race: 1909 Prest-O-Lite Trophy (Indianapolis)
- Last race: 1911 Indianapolis 500 (Indianapolis)
Wins	Podiums	Poles
0	0	0

Fred Woodworth Ellis (January 28, 1881 – November 9, 1954) was an American racing driver.

== Motorsports career results ==
=== Indianapolis 500 results ===
Year	Car	Start	Qual	Rank	Finish	Laps	Led	Retired
1911	24	21	—	—	38	22	0	Withdrawn
Totals						22	0	

Starts	1
Poles	0
Front Row	0
Wins	0
Top 5	0
Top 10	0
Retired	1
