= Harry Cobe =

American racing driver (1885–1966)

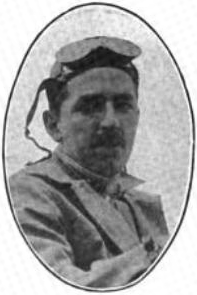
- Born: Harry Homer Cobe; December 17, 1885 Wakefield, Massachusetts, U.S.
- Died: July 24, 1966 (aged 80) East Candia, New Hampshire, U.S.

Champ Car career
- 4 races run over 2 years
- First race: 1909 Lowell Trophy (Merrimack Valley)
- Last race: 1911 American Grand Prize (Savannah)
Wins	Podiums	Poles
0	0	0

Harry Homer Cobe (December 17, 1885 – July 24, 1966) was an American racing driver who competed in the inaugural Indianapolis 500. He lived in East Candia at the time of his death.

== Motorsports career results ==
=== Indianapolis 500 results ===
Year	Car	Start	Qual	Rank	Finish	Laps	Led	Retired
1911	25	22	—	—	10	200	0	Running
Totals						200	0	

Starts	1
Poles	0
Front Row	0
Wins	0
Top 5	0
Top 10	1
Retired	0
