= Ralph Beardsley =

American racing driver (1888–1920)

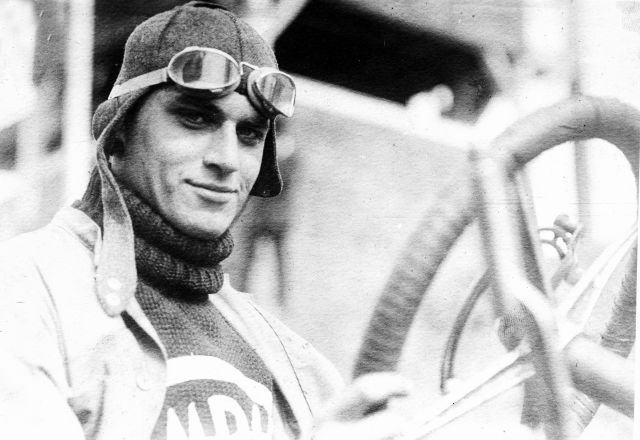
- Beardsley in 1911
- Born: Ralph Edward Beardsley; December 10, 1888 Ansonia, Connecticut, U.S.
- Died: March 18, 1920 (aged 31) Chesapeake Bay, off of Craney Island, Virginia, U.S.

Champ Car career
- 2 races run over 2 years
- First race: 1910 Vanderbilt Cup (Long Island)
- Last race: 1911 Indianapolis 500 (Indianapolis)
Wins	Podiums	Poles
0	0	0

Ralph Edward Beardsley (December 10, 1891 – March 18, 1920) was an American racing driver who participated in the 1911 Indianapolis 500.

== Biography ==
Beardsley was born on December 10, 1888, in Ansonia, Connecticut. He participated in the 1911 Indianapolis 500.

Beardsley drowned in a boating accident on March 18, 1920, near Craney Island, Virginia, in Chesapeake Bay, when his boat capsized in a storm.

== Motorsports career results ==
=== Indianapolis 500 results ===
Year	Car	Start	Qual	Rank	Finish	Laps	Led	Retired
1911	38	34	—	—	20	126	0	Flagged
Totals						126	0	

Starts	1
Poles	0
Front Row	0
Wins	0
Top 5	0
Top 10	0
Retired	0
