= Ernest Delany =

American racing driver (1889–1937)

- Born: Ernest J. Delany; January 5, 1889 Deckerville, Michigan, U.S.
- Died: August 29, 1937 (aged 48) Jackson, Michigan, U.S.

Champ Car career
- 1 race run over 1 year
- First race: 1911 Indianapolis 500 (Indianapolis)
Wins	Podiums	Poles
0	0	0

Ernest J. Delany (often seen as Delaney, January 5, 1889 – August 29, 1937) was an American racing driver.

== Motorsports career results ==
=== Indianapolis 500 results ===
Year	Car	Start	Qual	Rank	Finish	Laps	Led	Retired
1911	27	24	—	—	23	126	0	Flagged
Totals						126	0	

Starts	1
Poles	0
Front Row	0
Wins	0
Top 5	0
Top 10	0
Retired	0
