= Will Jones (racing driver) =

American racing driver (1889–1972)

- Born: William Lewis Jones Jr. January 23, 1889 Milwaukee, Wisconsin, U.S.
- Died: February 4, 1972 (aged 83) St. Augustine, Florida, U.S.

Champ Car career
- 1 race run over 1 year
- First race: 1911 Indianapolis 500 (Indianapolis)
Wins	Podiums	Poles
0	0	0

William Lewis Jones Jr. (January 23, 1889 – February 4, 1972) was an American racing driver who drove in the Indianapolis 500. He was born in Milwaukee, Wisconsin, and died, aged 83, in St. Augustine, Florida.

== Motorsports career results ==
=== Indianapolis 500 results ===
Year	Car	Start	Qual	Rank	Finish	Laps	Led	Retired
1911	9	9	—	19	28	122	0	Steering
Totals						122	0	

Starts	1
Poles	0
Front Row	0
Wins	0
Top 5	0
Top 10	0
Retired	1
