= List of Canadians in Champ Car =

This is a list of Canadians who have raced in American Championship Car Racing.

Driver	Birthplace	Starts	Wins
Ross Bentley	Vancouver, British Columbia	25	0
Claude Bourbonnais	L'Ile-Perrot, Quebec	6	0
William Bourque	West Farnham, Quebec	2	0
John Cannon	Hammersmith, England	16	0
Patrick Carpentier	Lasalle, Quebec	157	5
Zachary Claman DeMelo	Montreal, Quebec	10	0
Ed Crombie	Williams Lake, British Columbia	4	0
Devlin DeFrancesco	Toronto, Ontario	51	0
Doug Didero	Hamilton, Ontario	6	0
John Duff	Jiujiang, China	3	0
George Eaton	Toronto, Ontario	5	0
George Fejer	Budapest, Hungary	5	0
Billy Foster	Victoria, British Columbia	27	0
Scott Goodyear	Toronto, Ontario	136	5
Allen Heath	Saskatoon, Saskatchewan	3	0
Ludwig Heimrath Sr.	Germany	18	0
Ludwig Heimrath Jr.	Scarborough, Ontario	30	0
Pete Henderson	Arran, Ontario	29	1
Amos Hill	Plumas, Manitoba	1	0
Johnny Hill	Plumas, Manitoba	1	0
James Hinchcliffe	Toronto, Ontario	161	6
Cliff Hucul	Grande Prairie, Alberta	24	0
John Jones	Thunder Bay, Ontario	41	0
Dalton Kellett	Toronto, Ontario	41	0
Ed Kostenuk	Victoria, British Columbia	6	0
Frank Lescault	Vercheres, Quebec	1	1
Harry MacDonald	Windsor, Ontario	2	0
Bon MacDougall	Winnipeg, Manitoba	1	0
Bob McLean	Port Pirie, Australia	2	0
Arthur Miller	Teulon, Manitoba	1	0
Greg Moore	New Westminster, British Columbia	72	5
Andrew Ranger	Roxton Pond, Quebec	27	0
Eldon Rasmussen	Standard, Alberta	23	0
Hal Robson	Mount Dennis, Ontario	15	1
Marty Roth	Toronto, Ontario	21	0
Les Scott	Edmonton, Alberta	3	0
Roy Shadbolt	Victoria, British Columbia	1	0
Alex Tagliani	Montreal, Quebec	205	1
Paul Tracy	Scarborough, Ontario	281	31
Gene Trinique	Lavaltrie, Quebec	1	0
W. H. Turner	Toronto, Ontario	3	0
Ira Vail	Montreal, Quebec	46	1
Michael Valiante	New Westminster, British Columbia	2	0
Jacques Villeneuve	St-Jean-sur-Richelieu, Quebec	34	5
Jacques Villeneuve Sr.	St-Jean-sur-Richelieu, Quebec	36	1
Frank Weiss	Cardston, Alberta	8	0
Robert Wickens	Toronto, Ontario	14	0

== See also ==
- List of Canadian NASCAR drivers
