= Charles Basle =

American racing driver (1885–1962)

- Born: Charles Lucien Baslé; January 8, 1885 11th arrondissement of Paris, France
- Died: February 4, 1962 (aged 77) Los Angeles, California, U.S.

Champ Car career
- 9 races run over 4 years
- First race: 1909 Lowell Trophy (Merrimack Valley)
- Last race: 1921 Beverly Hills 250 (Beverly Hills)
| Wins | Podiums | Poles |
|---|---|---|
| 0 | 0 | 0 |

Charles Lucien Basle (born Baslé, January 8, 1885 – February 4, 1962) was a French-American racing driver.

== Life ==
Basle was born in Paris, France. In 1903, at age 18, Basle emigrated to the United States, landing in Boston, Massachusetts. He married Edna (née Temple) in Providence, Rhode Island, before migrating to California. According to his federal naturalization record (available at ) he did not become an American citizen until March 1941.

Basle did most of his racing in the 1900s and early 1910s. He won a 24 Hour race at Brighton Beach in August 1909. Basle made nine starts in AAA sanctioned races, including the 1911 Indianapolis 500. After a ten-year break, Basle made a surprise reappearance at the Los Angeles Speedway board track in 1921. His younger brother, Marcel, died in a racing accident at Chicago in June 1911.

Basle lived in Los Angeles for many years, where he worked in the auto industry. He eventually operated an auto repair business. He is buried in San Gabriel Mission Cemetery in San Gabriel, California.

== Motorsports career results ==
=== Indianapolis 500 results ===
| Year | Car | Start | Qual | Rank | Finish | Laps | Led | Retired |
|---|---|---|---|---|---|---|---|---|
| 1911 | 17 | 15 | — | — | 34 | 46 | 0 | Mechanical |
| Totals | | | | | | 46 | 0 | |

| Starts | 1 |
| Poles | 0 |
| Front Row | 0 |
| Wins | 0 |
| Top 5 | 0 |
| Top 10 | 0 |
| Retired | 1 |
