= Frank Fox (racing driver) =

American racing driver (1877–1931)

- Born: Frank P. Fox; June 10, 1877 Monroeville, Pennsylvania, U.S.
- Died: April 19, 1931 (aged 53) Crown Hill Cemetery and Arboretum Sec 104, Lot 29

Champ Car career
- 5 races run over 2 years
- First race: 1910 Prest-O-Lite Trophy (Indianapolis)
- Last race: 1911 Indianapolis 500 (Indianapolis)
Wins	Podiums	Poles
0	1	0

Frank P. Fox (June 10, 1877 – April 19, 1931) was an American racing driver. After his driving career ended, he turned to horse racing. The Fox Stake harness race is named after him. Fox is buried at Crown Hill Cemetery in Indianapolis.

== Motorsports career results ==
=== Indianapolis 500 results ===
Year	Car	Start	Qual	Rank	Finish	Laps	Led	Retired
1911	6	6	—	—	22	126	0	Flagged
Totals						126	0	

Starts	1
Poles	0
Front Row	0
Wins	0
Top 5	0
Top 10	0
Retired	0
