= Howard Hall (racing driver) =

American racing driver (1885–1940)

- Born: Howard Clinton Hall; February 2, 1885 Toledo, Ohio, U.S.
- Died: July 2, 1940 (aged 55) Fort Wayne, Indiana, U.S.

Champ Car career
- 2 races run over 2 years
- First race: 1909 Portola Festival Race (Portola)
- Last race: 1911 Indianapolis 500 (Indianapolis)
Wins	Podiums	Poles
0	0	0

Howard McFarland Hall (born Howard Clinton Hall, February 2, 1885 – July 2, 1940) was an American racing driver. Hall competed in the inaugural 1911 Indianapolis 500 in a Velie.

== Biography ==
Hall was born on February 2, 1885, in Toledo, Ohio, to Edmund Hall and Jennie McFarland. He was a mechanic for the Chevrolet team. In 1909, Hall competed in the Portola Road Race near San Francisco. Hall also served as a riding mechanic, riding with Bob Burman in the 1910 American Grand Prize.

Hall oversaw the Velie's racing program during the 1910s.

== Later life ==
After racing, Hall returned to Toledo and then moved to Fort Wayne, Indiana. He died on July 2, 1940, at the age of 55.

== Motorsports career results ==
=== Indianapolis 500 results ===
Year	Car	Start	Qual	Rank	Finish	Laps	Led	Retired
1911	41	36	—	—	17	126	0	Flagged
Totals						126	0	

Starts	1
Poles	0
Front Row	0
Wins	0
Top 5	0
Top 10	0
Retired	0
