= Louis Schwitzer =

American engineer (1880–1967)

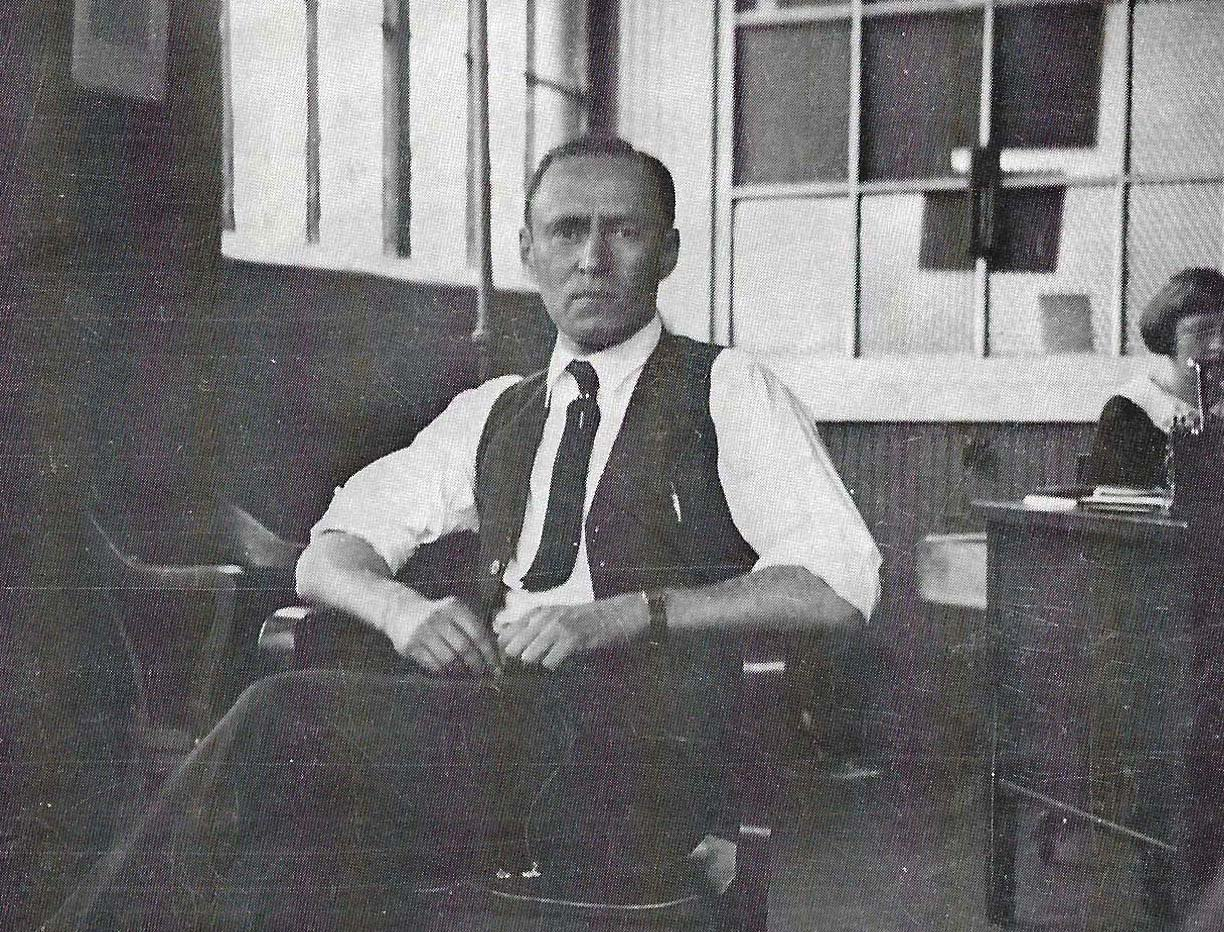
- Schwitzer circa 1910
- Born: Louis Heinrich Schwitzer; February 29, 1880 Bielitz, Silesia, Austria, Austro-Hungarian Empire (current day Bielsko-Biała, Bielsko County, Poland)
- Died: May 9, 1967 (aged 87) Indianapolis, Indiana, U.S.

Champ Car career
- 1 race run over 1 year
- First race: 1910 Wheeler-Schebler Trophy (Indianapolis)
Wins	Podiums	Poles
0	0	0

Louis Henry Schwitzer (February 29, 1880 – May 9, 1967) was an American engineer and early racing driver who was the winner of the first auto race ever held at the Indianapolis Motor Speedway. He later had a distinguished career as an engineer.

== Early life ==
Schwitzer obtained degrees in electrical and mechanical engineering from the Technical University of Darmstadt and the University of Karlsruhe.

== Engineering career ==
After arriving from Austria-Hungary, Schwitzer found work with Holzer-Cabot in Boston, Massachusetts. Schwitzer was influential in designing hydraulics for use in bus transportation. He also pioneered improvements in automotive cooling fans, water pumps and oil pumps, and the turbocharger. Schwitzer made a fortune in business and became a philanthropist. The Student Center at the University of Indianapolis bears his name, as did a women's dormitory at nearby Butler University.

== Racing career ==
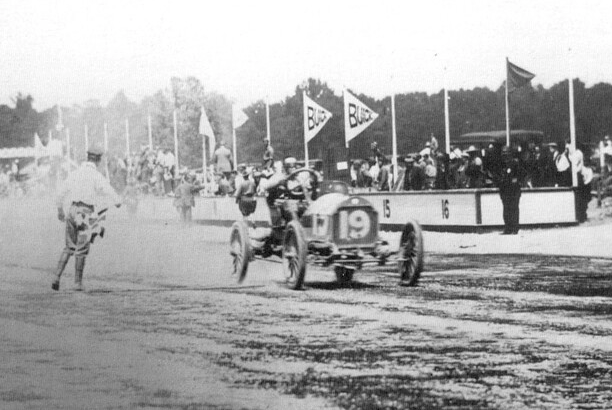
Schwitzer won the first auto race held at the Indianapolis Motor Speedway, a 5-mile, two lap event held on August 19, 1909

Schwitzer also competed in a few early automobile races. As a driver, Schwitzer won the first event held at the Indianapolis Motor Speedway, a five-mile race on August 19, 1909. He is known to have started five races at IMS during 1909 and 1910. He also drove relief, for Harry Cobe, in the first Indianapolis 500. Schwitzer served on the Indianapolis Motor Speedway Technical Committee from 1912 through 1945.

== Legacy ==
In recognition of Schwitzer's contributions to the early developmental history of American motorsports, the Louis Schwitzer Award for design innovation is presented annually after each running of the Indianapolis 500.

In 1970, Schwitzer was inducted into the Automotive Hall of Fame.

Schwitzer is buried at Crown Hill Cemetery in Indianapolis.
