= Cyrus Patschke =

American racing driver (1889–1951)

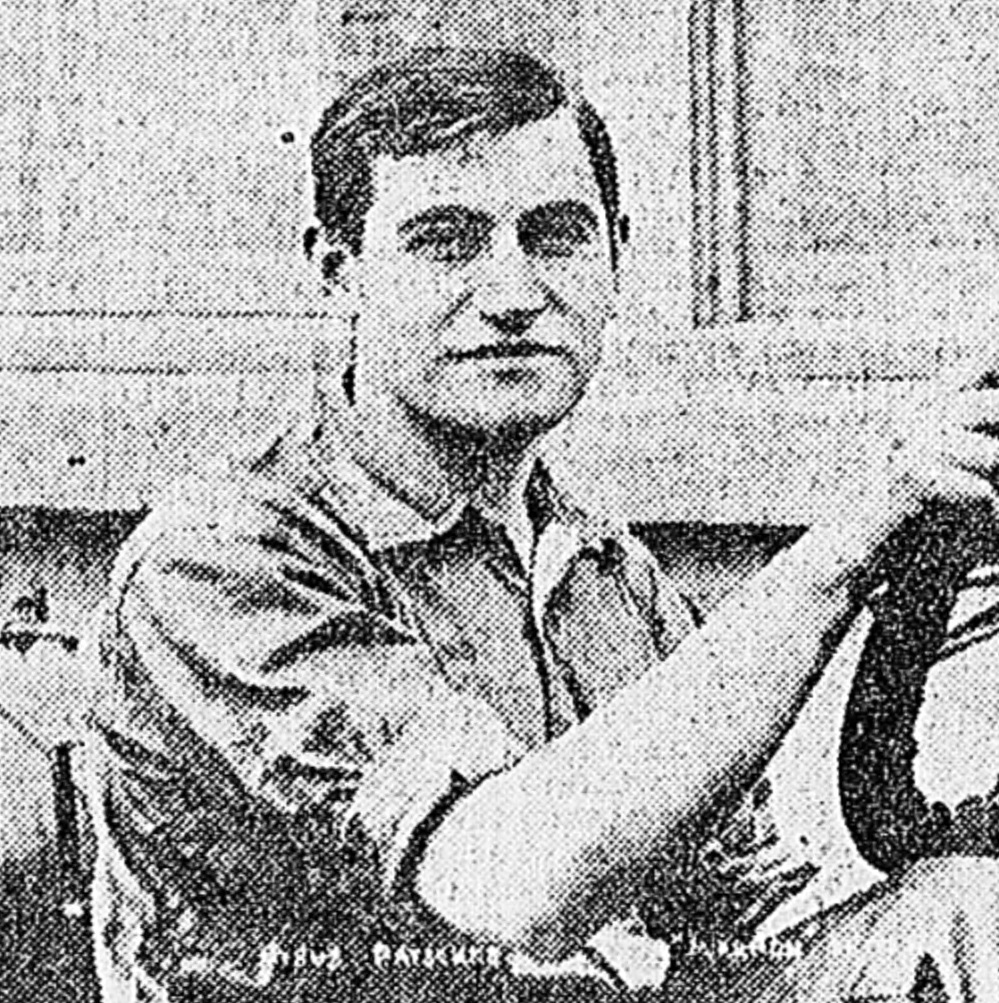
- Patschke, circa November of 1911
- Born: Cyrus Richard Patschke; July 6, 1889 Lebanon, Pennsylvania, U.S.
- Died: May 6, 1951 (aged 61) Lebanon, Pennsylvania, U.S.

Champ Car career
- 4 races run over 2 years
- First race: 1911 Dick Ferris Trophy (Santa Monica)
- Last race: 1914 Sioux City 300 (Sioux City)
Wins	Podiums	Poles
0	2	0

Cyrus Richard Patschke (July 6, 1889 – May 6, 1951) was an American racing driver. He is best known for driving relief for Ray Harroun, during the latter's victory in the inaugural Indianapolis 500.

== Biography ==
Patschke was born July 6, 1889, in Lebanon, Pennsylvania.

== Early career ==
Patschke first came to prominence as a racer driving in 24-hour endurance contests. He participated on teams that set mileage records in 1909 and 1910.

== 1911 Indianapolis 500 ==
In preparing his entry for the first Indianapolis 500 in 1911, Howard Marmon, the owner of the Marmon Motor Car Company, wanted his regular driver, Ray Harroun, to pilot the vehicle. However, Harroun had retired from driving the previous year and had no desire to return to the sport. After numerous conversations, Harroun agreed to drive, provided Marmon could hire the best possible relief driver (after the race Harroun would be quoted as saying "500 miles is too long a race for one man to think of driving"). When Marmon told Harroun that Patschke had offered to accept the job, Harroun reportedly replied "You can get Cy Patschke?"

During the race, Patschke relieved Harroun on lap 70 with the car in fifth place. Due to scoring confusion following an accident, and with numerous cars entering the pits, the exact details of Harroun reentering the car are unknown, but believed to have been between laps 102 and 105. Patschke had the car in either first or second position.

Later in the race, Patshke would also drive relief for Marmon's other entry, driven by Joe Dawson. Harroun would be recorded as the winner of the race, with Dawson's entry scored fifth. Patschke's name does not appear in the official scorecard, and his contributions would largely be forgotten.

== Later career and retirement ==
Patschke achieved a second place and a third-place finish in other events driving for Marmon. He retired from racing in 1915, operating an automobile dealership in his hometown of Lebanon. He and his wife, Millie, had one son Frederick Cyrus and a daughter, Joan.

Patschke died on May 6, 1951.
