= W. H. Turner =

Canadian racing driver (1877–1917)

- Born: William Henry Turner; August 30, 1877 Toronto, Ontario, Canada
- Died: May 11, 1917 (aged 39) Denver, Colorado, U.S.

Champ Car career
- 3 races run over 1 year
- First race: 1911 St. Francis Hotel Trophy (Portola)
- Last race: 1911 Indianapolis 500 (Indianapolis)
Wins	Podiums	Poles
0	0	0

William Henry Turner (August 30, 1877 – May 11, 1917) was a Canadian racing driver.

== Life ==
Turner was born and raised in Toronto. After marriage, while his wife and children remained in Toronto, Turner relocated to Buffalo, New York for work reasons. Although originally sending payments and visiting, eventually Turner ceased all contact with his family. He later lived in Wyoming, acting as a sales officer for the Maxwell Motor Company. He died in Denver after an illness.

== Motorsports career results ==
=== Indianapolis 500 results ===
Year	Car	Start	Qual	Rank	Finish	Laps	Led	Retired
1911	12	12	—	—	8	200	0	Running
Totals						200	0	

Starts	1
Poles	0
Front Row	0
Wins	0
Top 5	0
Top 10	1
Retired	0
