= Bert Dingley =

American racing driver (1885–1966)

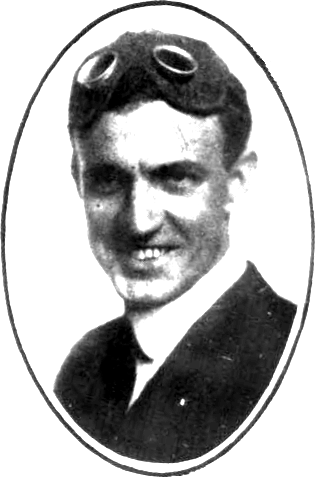
- Portrait from Motor Age, Vol. XXI, No. 22, May 30, 1912
- Born: Albert Francis Dingley; August 21, 1885 Oakdale, California, U.S.
- Died: April 7, 1966 (aged 80) Beech Grove, Indiana, U.S.

Champ Car career
- 17 races run over 5 years
- First race: 1909 Portland Race #1 (Portland)
- Last race: 1914 Montamarathon Trophy (Tacoma)
- First win: 1909 Wemme Cup (Portland)
- Last win: 1911 Panama-Pacific Race (Portola)
Wins	Podiums	Poles
3	10	0

Albert Francis Dingley (August 21, 1885 – April 7, 1966) was an American racing driver.

== Racing career ==
Having started his career on the West Coast by 1904, Dingley appeared in a couple of Vanderbilt Cup races and sustained serious injuries at Tacoma in 1914.

=== 1909 AAA national championship ===
Dingley was selected as the 1909 "driver of the year" by American automotive journal Motor Age. He gained recognition as the 1909 national champion by the AAA Contest Board when championship results were retrospectively calculated in 1927. However, when results were being revisited in 1951 by negationist sportswriter Russ Catlin, who selected "winners" of retroactively awarded 1902 through 1908 championships, Dingley was stripped of the 1909 revisionist championship, which was instead given to George Robertson.

== Death ==
Dingley died in a nursing home in Beech Grove, Indiana on April 7, 1966, aged 80.

== Motorsports career results ==
=== Indianapolis 500 results ===
Year	Car	Start	Qual	Rank	Finish	Laps	Led	Retired
1912	12	10	80.770	14	13	116	0	Rod
Totals						116	0	

Starts	1
Poles	0
Front Row	0
Wins	0
Top 5	0
Top 10	0
Retired	1
