= Billy Knipper =

American racing driver (1882–1968)

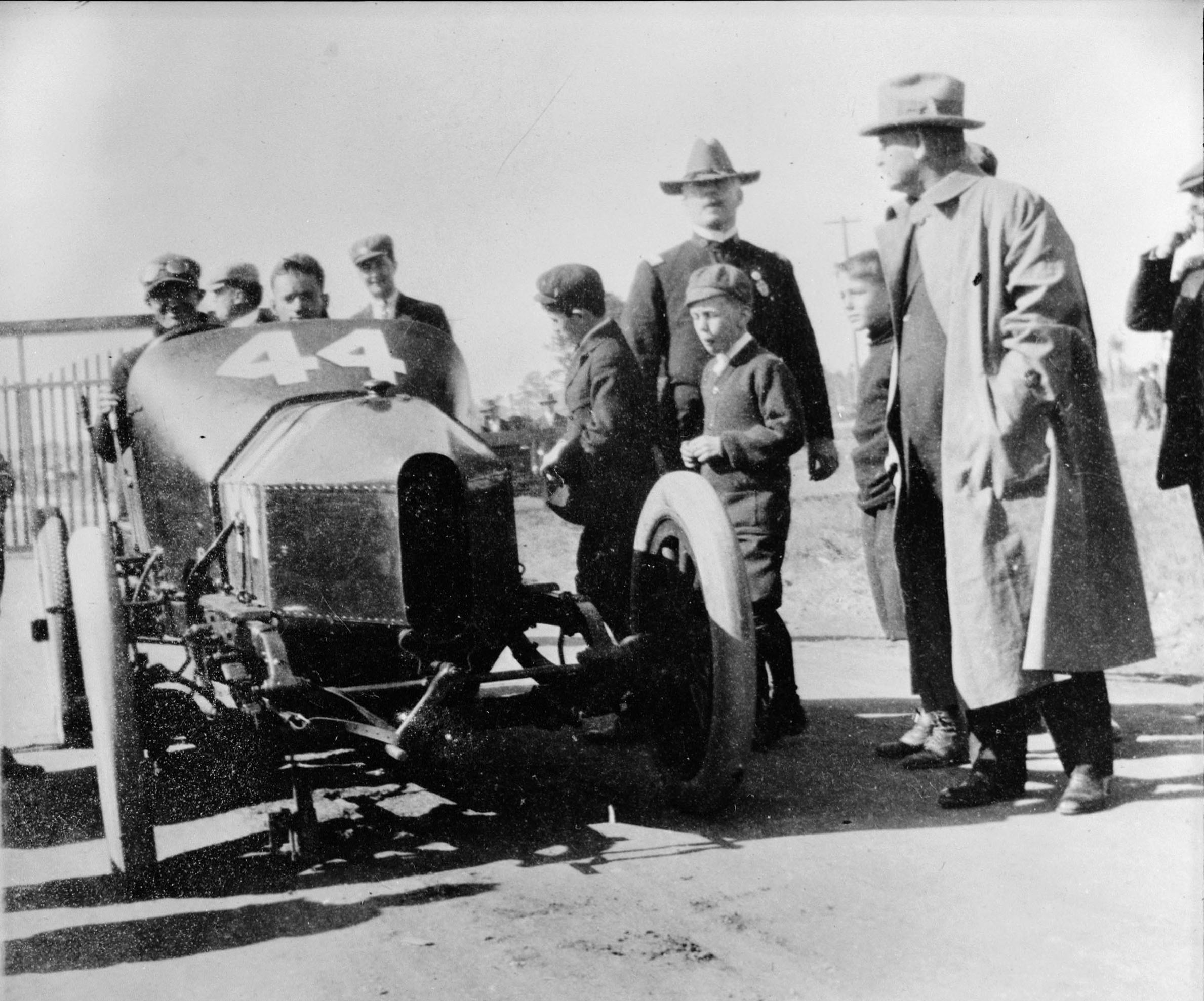
- Knipper in Lancia tipo 55 corsa in Savannah on 18 November, 1910
- Born: William Peter Knipper; August 9, 1882 Rochester, New York, U.S.
- Died: September 7, 1968 (aged 86) Rochester, New York, U.S.

Champ Car career
- 9 races run over 5 years
- First race: 1909 Indiana Trophy (Crown Point)
- Last race: 1914 Sioux City 300 (Sioux City)
- First win: 1909 Merrimack Valley Trophy (Merrimack Valley)
Wins	Podiums	Poles
1	3	0

William Peter Knipper (August 9, 1882 – September 7, 1968) was an American racing driver.

== Biography ==
Knipper was born in Rochester, New York, the son of William Peter and Mary E. Nura Knipper. He married Mae Christine Ottman November 6, 1913, in Rochester.

A hillclimb was held at West Dugway Hill, Penfield, New York, on October 13, 1906. The free-for-all class was won by Knipper (Thomas 60 h.p.) in a time of 51.8 sec.

At the time of his marriage in 1913, Knipper was employed as an engraver, and was an automobile sealership owner in Rochester, New York.

Knipper died on September 7, 1968, in Rochester, New York.

== Motorsports career results ==
=== Indianapolis 500 results ===
Year	Car	Start	Qual	Rank	Finish	Laps	Led	Retired
1911	46	40	—	—	18	126	0	Flagged
1913	10	11	80.260	20	16	125	0	Clutch
1914	31	12	89.570	14	13	200	0	Running
Totals						451	0	

Starts	3
Poles	0
Front Row	0
Wins	0
Top 5	0
Top 10	0
Retired	1
