= Harvey Herrick =

American racing driver (1884–1936)

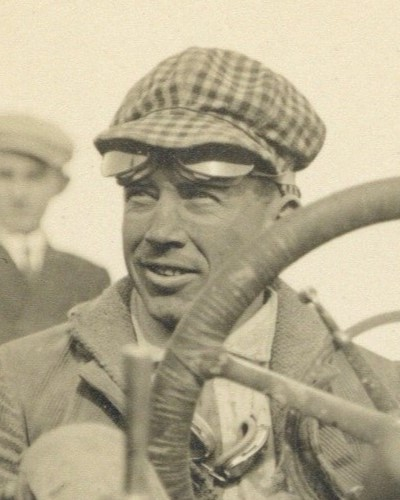
- Herrick in 1911
- Born: Harvey Dick Herrick; June 4, 1884 Phoenix, Arizona Territory, U.S.
- Died: May 30, 1936 (aged 51) Los Angeles, California, U.S.

Champ Car career
- 3 races run over 1 year
- First race: 1911 Tevis Cup (Bakersfield)
- Last race: 1911 Leon Shettler Cup (Santa Monica)
- First win: 1911 Tevis Cup (Bakersfield)
- Last win: 1911 Dick Ferris Trophy (Santa Monica)
Wins	Podiums	Poles
2	2	0

Harvey Dick Herrick (June 4, 1884 – May 30, 1936) was an American racing driver. He was the de facto American National Champion in 1911, as proclaimed by the contemporary journal Motor Age. Herrick competed for the National Motor Vehicle Company.

== Early life ==
Harvey Dick Herrick was born in Phoenix, Arizona Territory. He was the second son of Newell Herrick, a blacksmith, and Anne (née Kellogg). In 1892, Herrick's father died unexpectedly, and Herrick's mother raised her two sons alone. By the year 1900, the family had relocated to Los Angeles, California.

By 1906, Herrick was working as an automobile sales representative.
