= Arthur Greiner =

American racing driver (1884–1917)

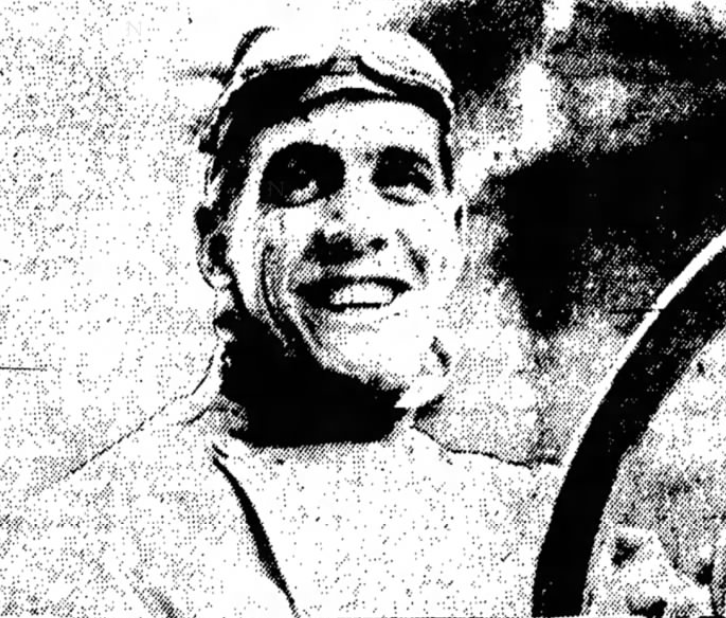
- Born: Arthur William Greiner; April 28, 1884 Chicago, Illinois, U.S.
- Died: May 24, 1917 (aged 33) Milwaukee, Wisconsin, U.S.

Champ Car career
- 4 races run over 3 years
- First race: 1910 Illinois Trophy (Elgin)
- Last race: 1911 Indianapolis 500 (Indianapolis)
Wins	Podiums	Poles
0	1	0

Arthur William Greiner (April 28, 1884 – May 24, 1917) was an American racing driver, and historically the first to finish last in the Indianapolis 500. Greiner crashed on the backstretch after completing twelve laps during the inaugural race. His riding mechanic, Sam Dickson, was killed in the accident

Greiner died in a Milwaukee sanitarium following a nervous breakdown.

== Motorsports career results ==
=== Indianapolis 500 results ===
Year	Car	Start	Qual	Rank	Finish	Laps	Led	Retired
1911	44	38	—	—	40	12	0	Crash BS
Totals						12	0	

Starts	1
Poles	0
Front Row	0
Wins	0
Top 5	0
Top 10	0
Retired	1
