= Merrimack Valley Course =

Street circuit in Lowell, Massachusetts

- Location: Lowell, Massachusetts, USA
- Coordinates: 42°38′25.9″N 71°21′25.4″W
- Opened: 1908
- Closed: 1909
- Length: 17 km (11 mi)
- Turns: 30

The Merrimack Valley Course was a temporary street circuit in Lowell, Massachusetts. The 10.6 mile track hosted its first races in 1908 and was on the 1909 AAA Championship Car schedule. Due to financial losses, racing was discontinued after that season.

== Layout ==
The Merrimack Valley Course was a 10.6 mile-long street circuit that ran through Lowell's Pawtucketville neighborhood and part of Tyngsborough, Massachusetts. 6 miles of the course stretched along Pawtucket Boulevard, which ran along the Merrimack River. The boulevard was originally built for harness racing and contained a four-mile straightaway which was the only straight part of the course. The grandstand was constructed on the straightaway. The remainder of the course, known as the back stretch, was on country roads that, although they dated back to the Colonial era, were in fairly good condition. The back stretch contained a sharp downward slope known as "The Dip". The course contained 30 turns and was described by Motor Age as "one of the strangest yet used in this country" because it "resembled a monster crinkled-up earthworm" at a time when most street circuits were triangle, oval, or rectangle-shaped. The only sharp turns were on both ends of Dunbar Avenue. After exiting Dunbar, the vehicles traveled down Varnum Avenue and Sherburne Avenue before returning to Pawtucket Boulevard. The circuit passed by the Vesper Country Club’s clubhouse, which was used to accommodate race officials and the press. For the 1909 races, the hairpin turn where Al Poole had his accident the previous year was widened by 12 feet, which required cutting down a landmark willow tree. AAA also required "The Dip" to be leveled somewhat. Because the Pawtucket Bridge had been deemed unsafe, patrons coming from Lowell proper could only access the course via a bridge two miles to the east. In 1909, race organizers erected a pontoon bridge in order to accommodate these spectators.

== History ==
=== Creation ===
On July 4, 1907, the Lowell Automobile Club hosted races on a five-mile stretch of Pawtucket Boulevard.

On May 6, 1908, manufacturer John O. Henize announced plans for a 200-mile Fourth of July auto race in Lowell, Massachusetts. Mayor Frederick W. Farnham pledged his support and Butler Ames donated a trophy for the race. Any proceeds from the race would be given to the communities of Lowell and Tyngsborough to defray the cost of road repairs. Ames requested the deployment of Massachusetts Militiamen to guard the course, but Acting Governor Eben Sumner Draper denied the request, finding no legal basis to grant it. Instead, the entire Lowell Police Department was assigned to patrol the course.

Peter A. Fay led a group of Lowell citizens who objected to the use of public streets for racing and sought an injunction to stop the race. On May 31, Barney Oldfield crashed into a tree and was injured during a practice run of the course, which further prejudiced the public against the race. City Solicitor Amos G. Hill gave the legal opinion that the city did not have the right to set aside public roads for racing. Due to the significant opposition, the July 4 race was not held.

=== Butler Ames Cup ===
The organizing committee, however, did not give up on holding a race and was able to get a bill passed in the Massachusetts General Court that would allow the Lowell and Tyngsborough governments to give the Lowell Automobile Club permission to shut down public roads to host the race. As a result, the club was able to host a race on Labor Day 1908.

Louis Strang won the Butler Ames trophy in a time of 4:42:34, over an hour faster than runner-up Harry Grant. William Bourque finished third in a Knox and George Robertson finished fourth in a Fiat. Bob Burman was disqualified for having assistance in changing his radiator and the other two drivers, Frank Lescault and Charles Basle did not finish the race. Al Poole broke his collarbone in an accident during Saturday’s practice session and was not able to compete in the race.

Although the inaugural race drew an estimated 100,000 spectators, the Lowell Automotive Club suffered a heavy financial loss.

=== 1909 Carnival of Speed ===
On April 7, 1909, Henize announced that for a $10,000 guarantee, Lowell could take Chicago’s place on the 1909 AAA Championship Car schedule. On June 29, 1909 Henize and the AAA Contest Board settled on details for a Labor Day race. The City of Lowell put up the $10,000 guarantee and the Lowell Automobile Club was responsible for all other costs, including funding for the construction of the grandstands, treatment of the roadbed, and the erection of fences and wire mesh.

On August 31, 1909, Joe Matson, who was practicing on the course, struck and killed Arthur Otis, a Varnum Avenue resident who was crossing the street on his way to work at a mill.

The three-day racing festival featured a three-class road race on Monday, speed trials on Tuesday, and a 315-mile race on Wednesday. The 12 lap Merrimack Valley Trophy Race was won by Billy Knipper in a Chalmers. Louis Chevrolet won the 15 lap Yorick Club Trophy Race in a Buick. Another Buick, this one driven by Bob Burman, won the 20 lap Vesper Club Trophy Race. All three races were run on the course at the same time. Barney Oldfield won the speed trials in Mercedes-Benz.

The 318-mile Lowell Trophy race was described by Motor Age as "one of the greatest of its kind ever run in America." Herbert Lytle took the lead on lap eight, but was forced to retire three laps later, giving the lead back to George Robertson. Ralph DePalma, who was in third place, pushed hard and looked like he could challenge Robertson, however he was forced to retire after 12 laps. On Lap 28, Harry Grant took the lead from Robertson, but was forced to retire before the next lap was over. Robertson won with a time of 5:52:01.

A few days after the races ended, the Merrimack Valley Course hosted a marathon, which was won by Hans Holmer of Quebec, and a hot-air balloon demonstration by Charles Jasper Glidden.

The final day of the carnival saw the circuit host motorcycle races. Jake Desrochiers won the race for professional drivers and Fred Huyck won the speed trials.

=== Cancellation ===
Although the races drew large crowds, the 9,000 seat grandstand was never more than two-thirds full and the Lowell Automobile Club was unable to cover its expenses. On February 13, 1910, The New York Times reported that the Lowell race would be abandoned.
