= Joe Matson =

American racing driver (1881–1937)

- Matson, circa 1912
- Born: Joseph Mathew Matson; March 6, 1881 Brighton, Massachusetts, U.S.
- Died: January 4, 1937 (aged 55) Winthrop, Massachusetts, U.S.

Champ Car career
- 7 races run over 4 years
- First race: 1909 Indiana Trophy (Crown Point)
- Last race: 1912 Indianapolis 500 (Indianapolis)
- First win: 1909 Indiana Trophy (Crown Point)
Wins	Podiums	Poles
1	1	0

Joseph Mathew Matson (March 6, 1881 – January 4, 1937) was an American racing driver from Brighton, Massachusetts (now a neighborhood of Boston) who raced in the second Indianapolis 500.

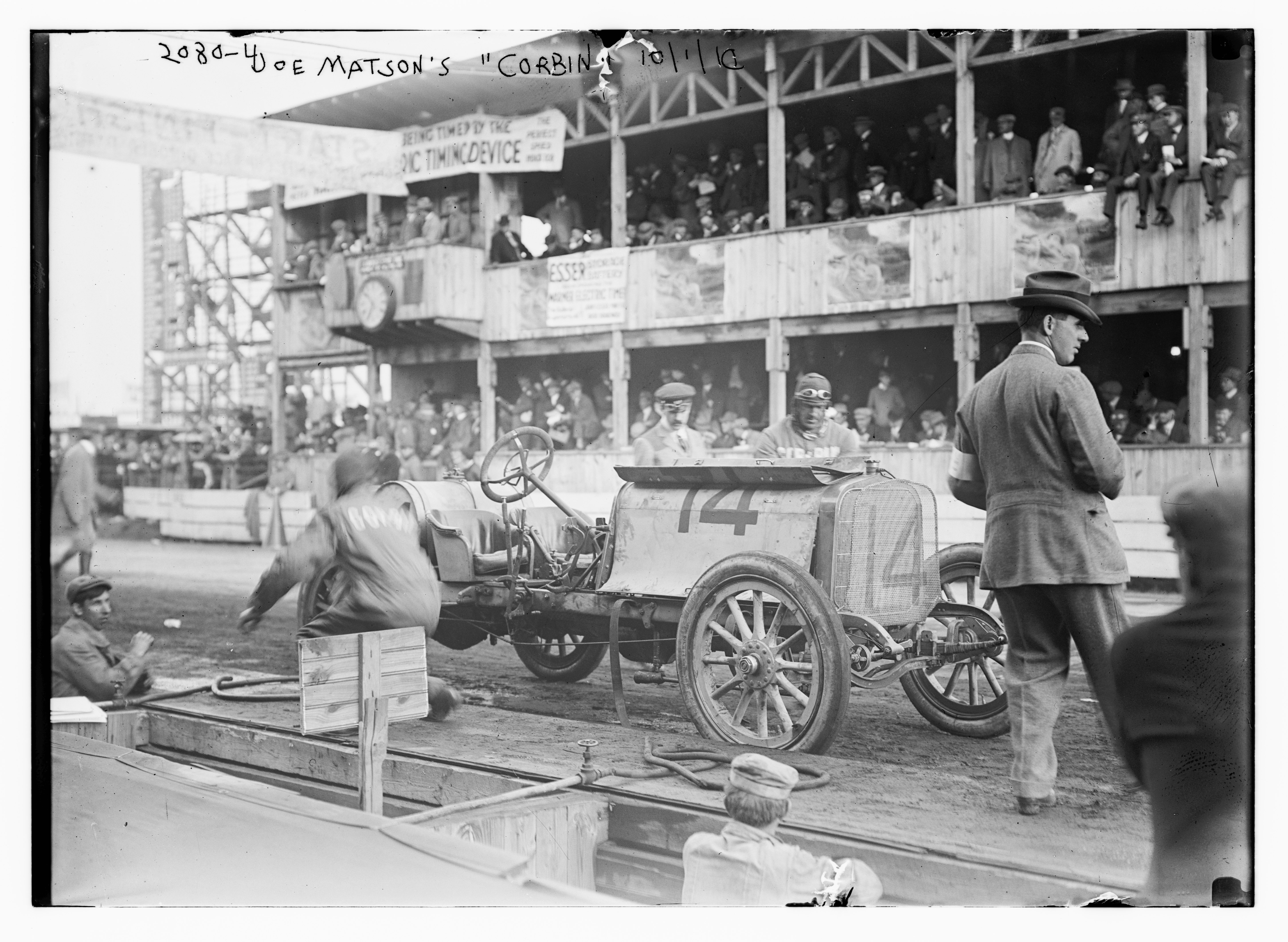

== Motorsports career results ==
=== Indianapolis 500 results ===
Year	Car	Start	Qual	Rank	Finish	Laps	Led	Retired
1912	25	21	79.900	17	14	110	0	Crankshaft
Totals						110	0	

Starts	1
Poles	0
Front Row	0
Wins	0
Top 5	0
Top 10	0
Retired	1
