= Sam Dickson =

American race car mechanic (1887–1911)

Samuel Parker Dickson (May 21, 1887 in Chicago – May 30, 1911) was a race car riding mechanic, and the first person to be killed in the Indianapolis 500.

He was the son of writer Maxwell E. Dickson and Martha E. Dickson.

Dickson was buried at Rosehill Cemetery.

== Indianapolis 500 ==
In the inaugural race, Dickson was the riding mechanic for Arthur Greiner, who was making his only 500 appearance. On lap twelve, one of the front wheels came off of the American Simplex car Greiner was driving, causing Greiner to lose control and both men to be thrown from the car. Dickson flew into a fence twenty feet from the car. Reports state that Dickson was killed instantly, although the crowd evidently swarmed around the body, requiring the state militia who were acting as security at the event to use their guns as clubs to clear a path for the attending doctors.
