= Herbert Lytle =

American racing driver (1874–1932)

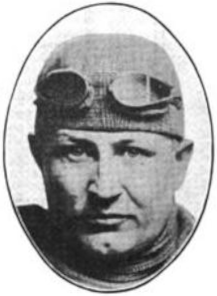
- Born: Herbert Hartland Lytle; July 9, 1874 Malone, New York, U.S.
- Died: March 4, 1932 (aged 57) Warsaw, Indiana, U.S.

Champ Car career
- 9 races run over 4 years
- Best finish: 8th (1905)
- First race: 1905 Glenville Race (Cleveland)
- Last race: 1911 Indianapolis 500 (Indianapolis)
- First win: 1910 50-mile Race (Atlanta)
Wins	Podiums	Poles
1	4	0

Herbert Hartland Lytle (July 9, 1874 – March 4, 1932) was an American racing driver.

== Biography ==
Lytle was born in Malone, New York on July 9, 1874. He began racing automobiles circa 1900, and first teamed-up with James Bates, who became his riding mechanic. He competed in multiple racing venues and won a 50-mile race at the Atlanta Motordorome, which was a two-mile dirt race course.

Lytle was the only American driver to finish the Gordon Bennett Cup races in France in 1905.

Lytle died in Warsaw, Indiana on March 4, 1932. His wife Josephine Della J. Leer Lytle died the following day, at the age of 36. They both died of pneumonia. A dual funeral service was conducted on March 7, 1932. He was previously married to Gertrude Fannie Harbord Lytle, who predeceased him on May 23, 1926.

== Motorsports career results ==
=== Indianapolis 500 results ===
Year	Car	Start	Qual	Rank	Finish	Laps	Led	Retired
1911	35	31	—	—	32	82	0	Crash in pits
Totals						82	0	

Starts	1
Poles	0
Front Row	0
Wins	0
Top 5	0
Top 10	0
Retired	1
