= Harry Grant (racing driver) =

American racing driver (1877–1915)

- Grant, circa 1910
- Born: Harold Fletcher Grant; July 10, 1877 Cambridge, Massachusetts, U.S.
- Died: October 7, 1915 (aged 38) Coney Island, New York, U.S.

Championship titles
- Major victories Vanderbilt Cup (1909, 1910)

Champ Car career
- 23 races run over 6 years
- First race: 1909 Lowell Trophy (Merrimack Valley)
- Last race: 1915 Providence 100 (Narragansett Park)
- First win: 1909 Vanderbilt Cup (Long Island)
- Last win: 1910 Vanderbilt Cup (Long Island)
Wins	Podiums	Poles
2	4	0

Harold Fletcher Grant (July 10, 1877 – October 7, 1915) was an American racing driver. He was the first two-time victor of the Vanderbilt Cup, winning in 1909 and 1910.

== Biography ==
Grant was born in Cambridge, Massachusetts, on July 10, 1877. His father was a mining engineer who was killed in a mining accident in Colorado.

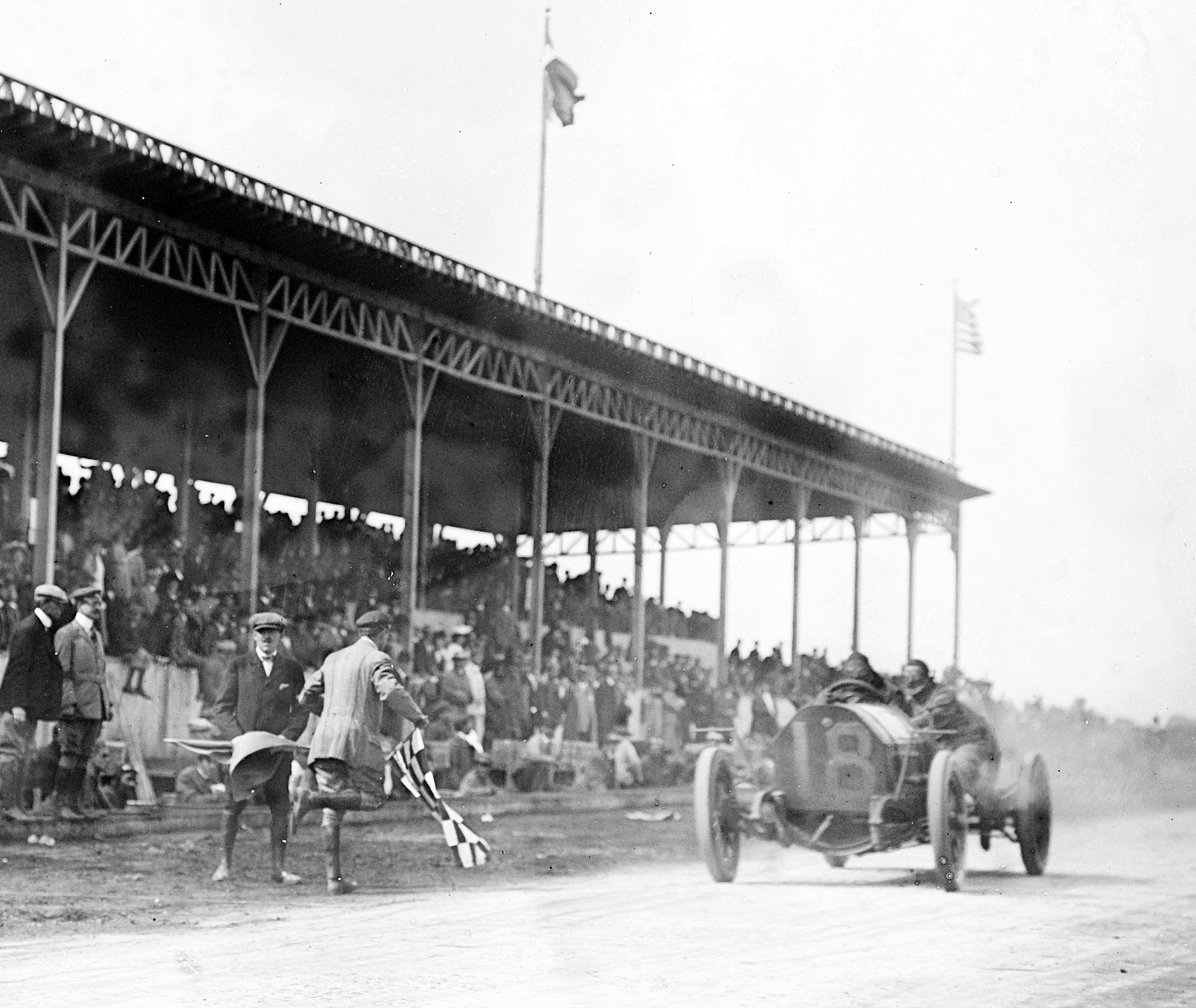
Grant winning the 1910 Vanderbilt Cup

Driving an American Locomotive Company automobile, Grant won the Vanderbilt Cup on Long Island Motor Parkway in 1909 and 1910. He then competed in the Indianapolis 500 four times between 1911 and 1915. He had his best showing in 1914, finishing in seventh place.

On the second lap of practice for the Astor Cup at Sheepshead Bay Speedway on September 28, 1915, his car caught fire in the banked turns of the speedway. With his car and himself on fire, he went over 90 miles per hour (140 km/h) until getting out of the turn, traveling 450 feet (140 m) before coming to a stop. Grant suffered heavy burns and taken by another car to Coney Island Hospital. He had shown signs of recovering but he died of his burns at Coney Island Hospital on October 7, 1915.

== Motorsports career results ==
=== Indianapolis 500 results ===
Year	Car	Start	Qual	Rank	Finish	Laps	Led	Retired
1911	19	17	—	—	33	51	0	Bearings
1913	26	6	75.960	25	24	14	0	Gas tank
1914	27	26	86.460	29	7	200	0	Running
1915	14	10	89.290	10	12	184	0	Loose Mud Apron
Totals						449	0	

Starts	4
Poles	0
Front Row	0
Wins	0
Top 5	0
Top 10	1
Retired	3
