= Inter-State Automobile Company =

Defunct American motor vehicle manufacturer

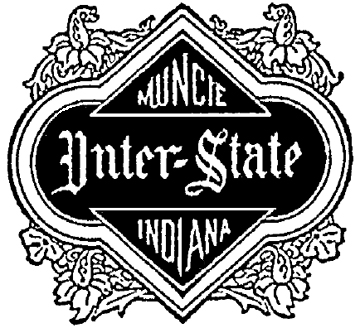
- Industry: Automotive
- Founded: 1909; 117 years ago
- Founder: Thomas F. Hart
- Defunct: 1919; 107 years ago
- Fate: Sold plant to General Motors
- Headquarters: Muncie, Indiana, United States
- Key people: Thomas F. Hart, Frank C. Ball
- Products: Vehicles; Automotive parts
- Production output: 8,179 (1909-1918)

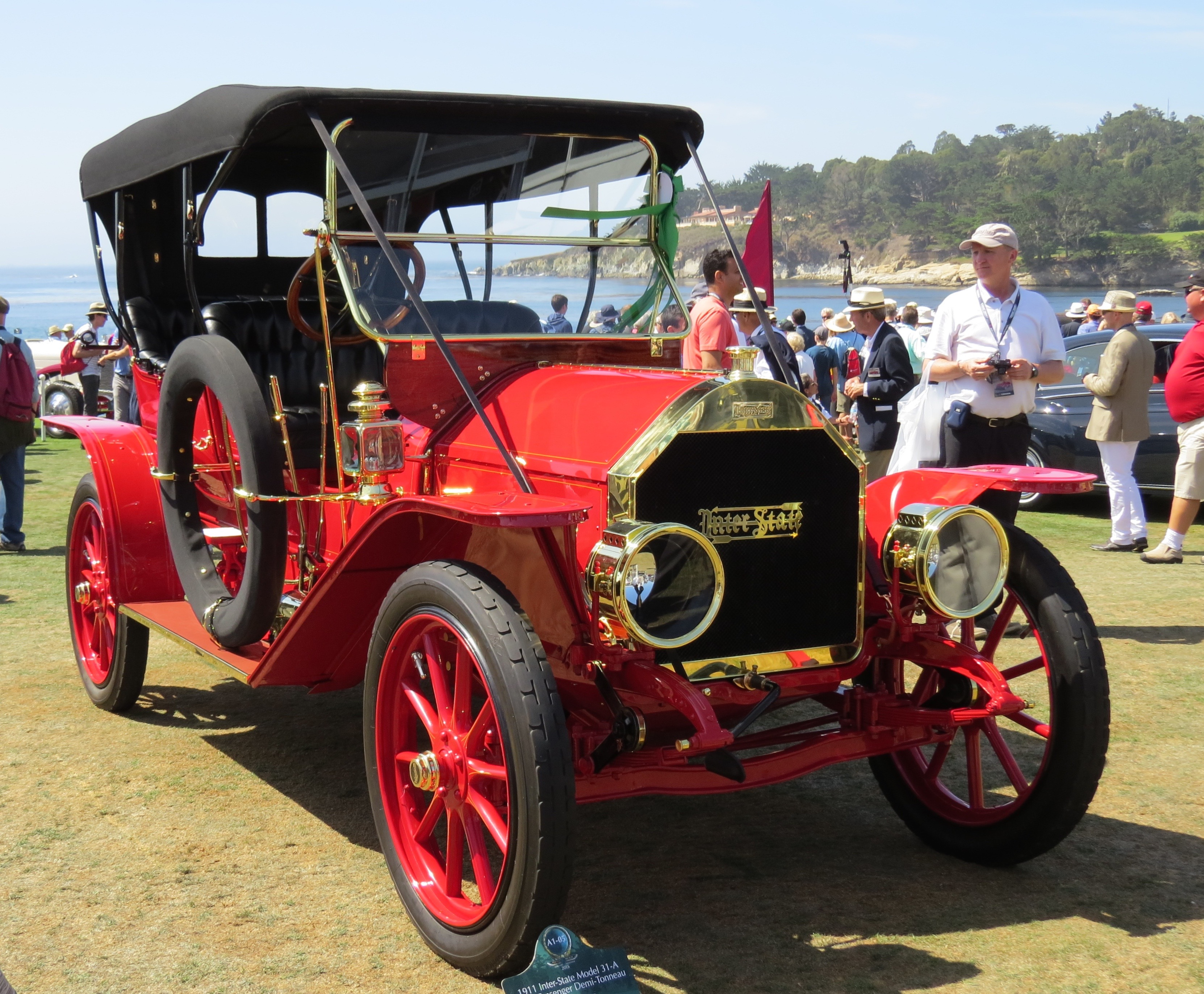
1911 Inter-State Model 31-A Demi-Touring

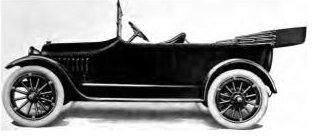
1916 Inter-State Touring Car

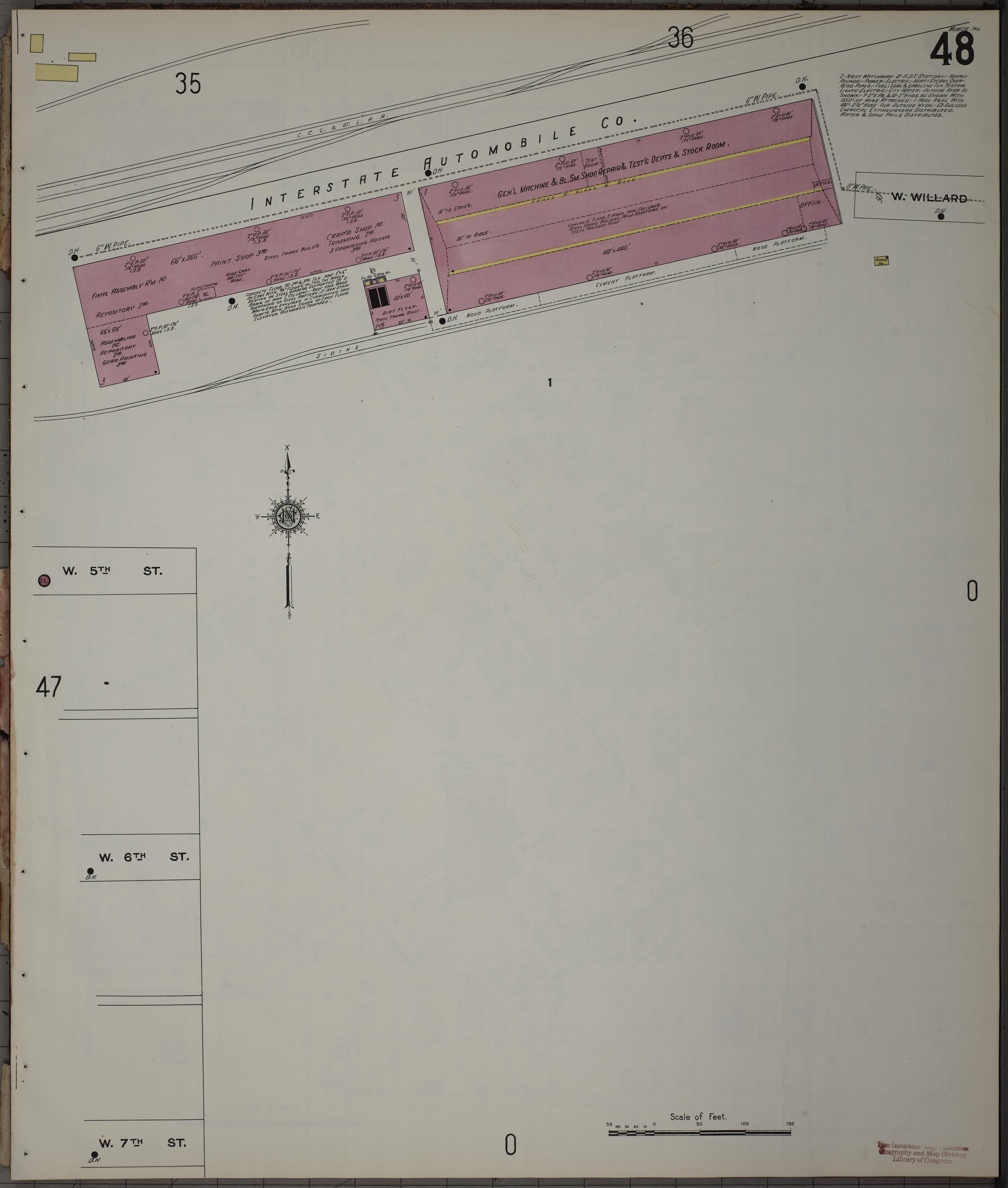
Inter-State Automobile Company Plant (1910)

The Inter-State was a Brass Era car built in Muncie, Indiana, by Inter-State Automobile Company from 1909 to 1919.

== History ==
=== Company name ===
Thomas F. Hart announced in October 1908 the winning name of his new company, chosen via a contest. The Inter-State Automobile Company set up shop at 142 Willard Street. Ads stated "we could get more for this car." Originally, all Inter-States were mid-market, both in size and price, with four-cylinder engines. In 1913, 6-cylinder engines were added.

Receivership followed in the fall of 1913. Thomas Hart cited "internal dissention and his inability to secure working capital because of disagreement among stockholders." In February 1914, Frank C. Ball (one of the original Inter-State investors) bought the Inter-State factory and real estate. This resulted in a renaming of the parent company to the Inter-State Motor Company.

=== General Motors ===
In 1915, a new Beaver 4-cylinder low-priced car was released. By May 1918, automobile production was suspended in favor of war work. In late February 1919, F. C. Ball announced he would be resuming passenger car production, but by March of the same year, Ball sold the Inter-State factory to General Motors for them to produce their new Sheridan.

== Overview of production figures ==
Year	Production	Model
1909	323	
1910	627	
1911	839	Model 31 A; Model 34
1912	1.012	
1913	614	
1914	117	
1915	1.123	
1916	1.238	
1917	1.413	
1918	876	
Sum	8.182	

== Advertisements ==
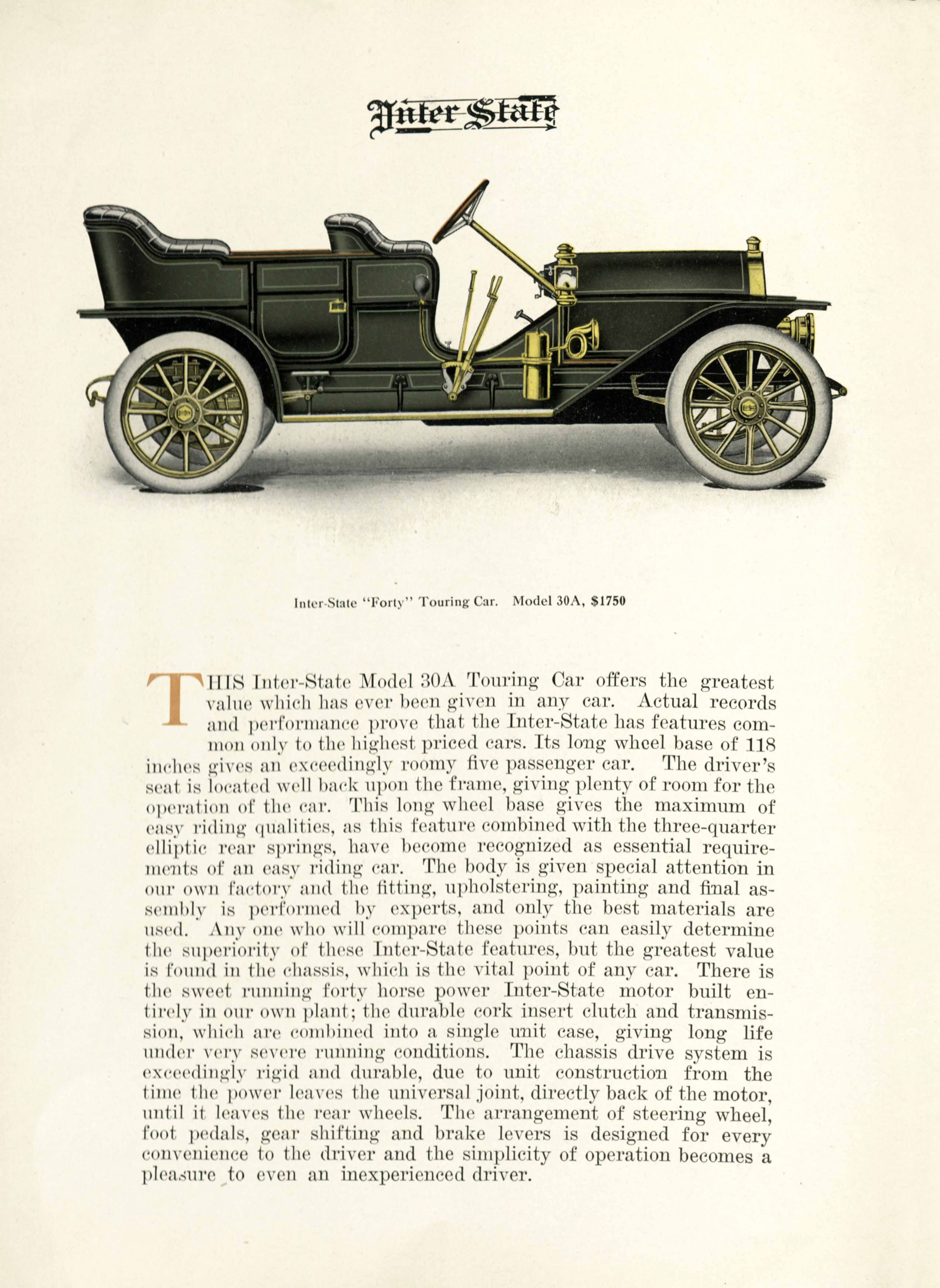
1911 Inter-State Forty Touring Car Model 39A from brochure

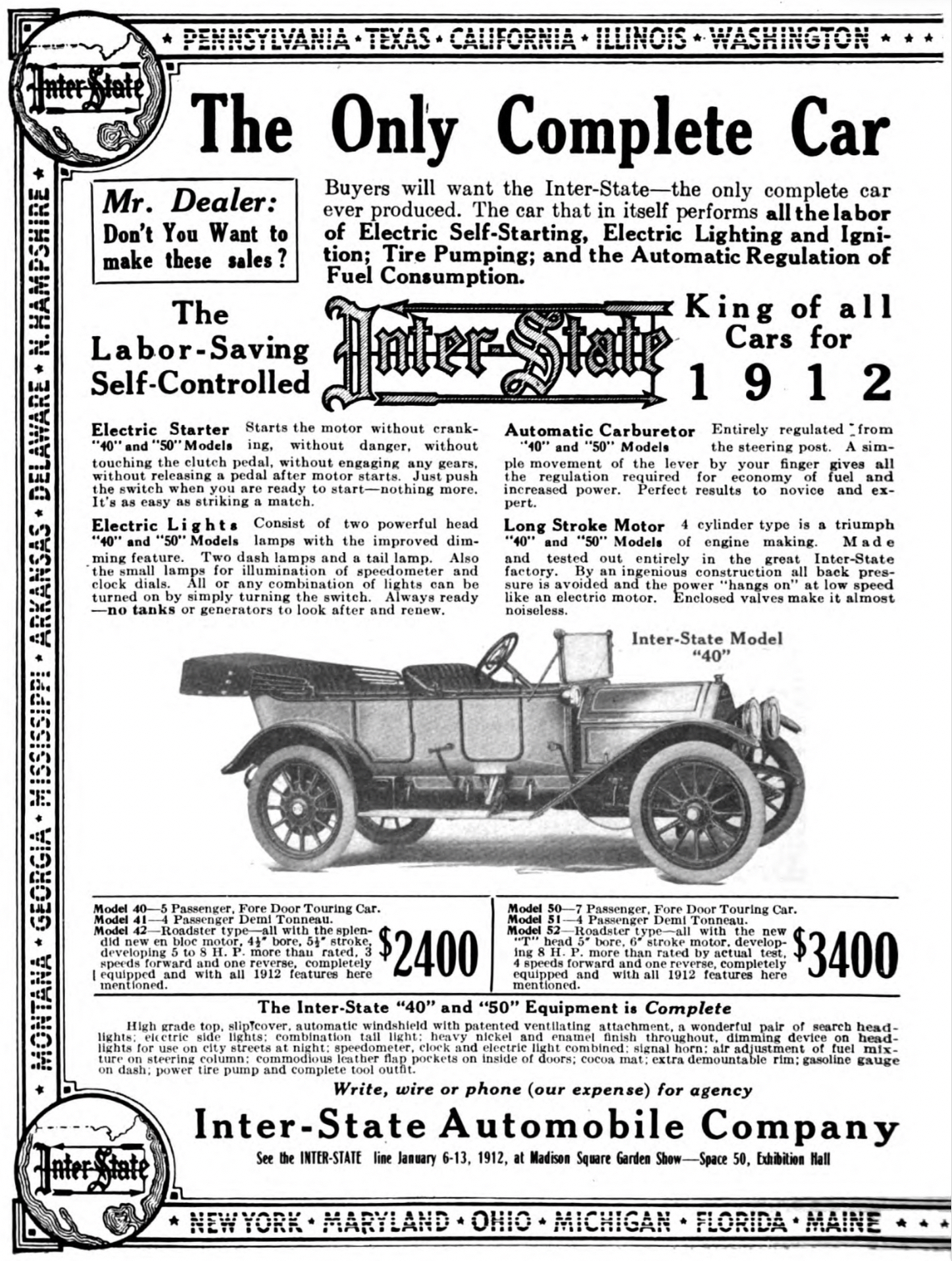
Inter-State advertisement (1912)

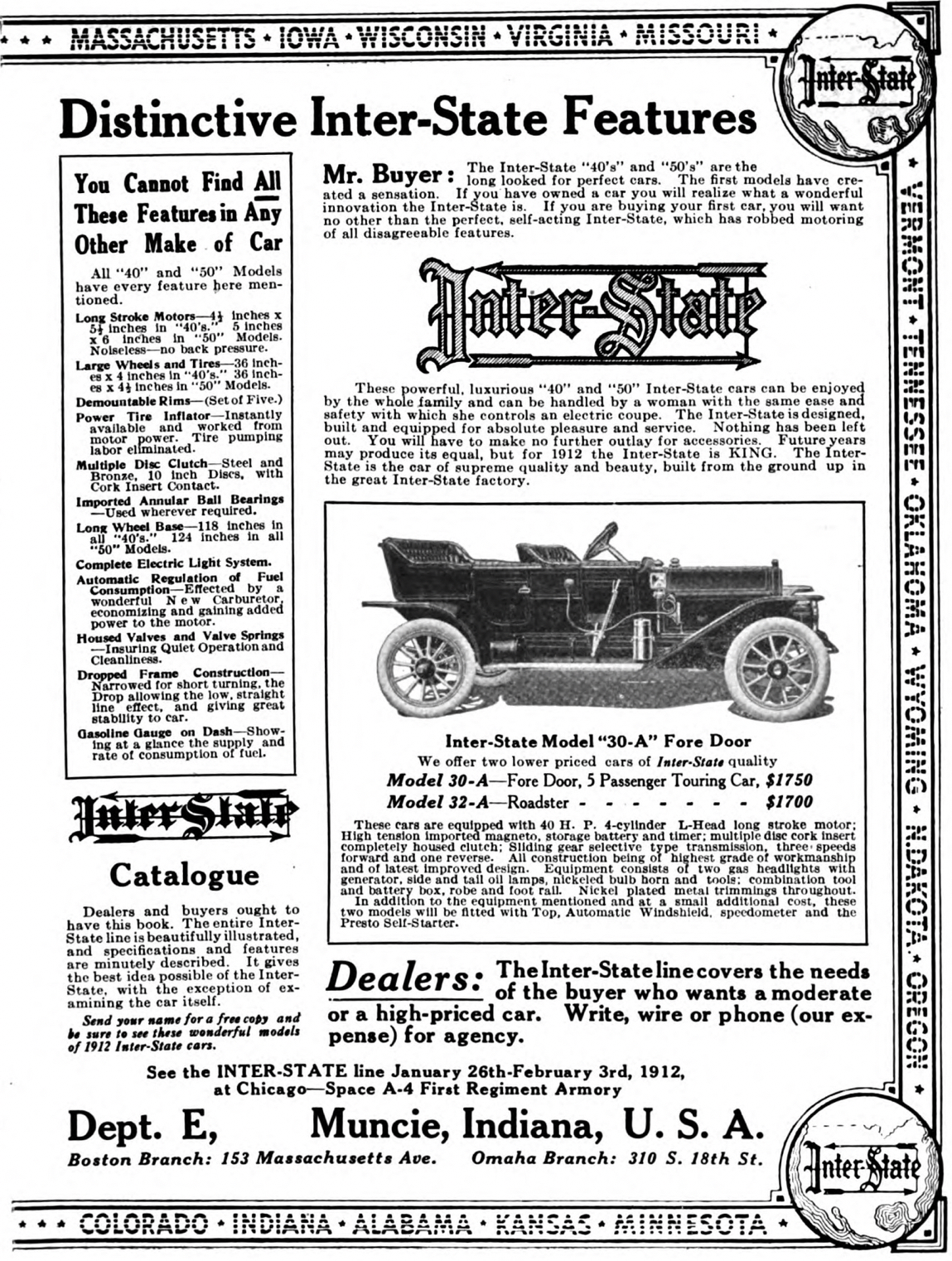
Inter-State advertisement (1912)

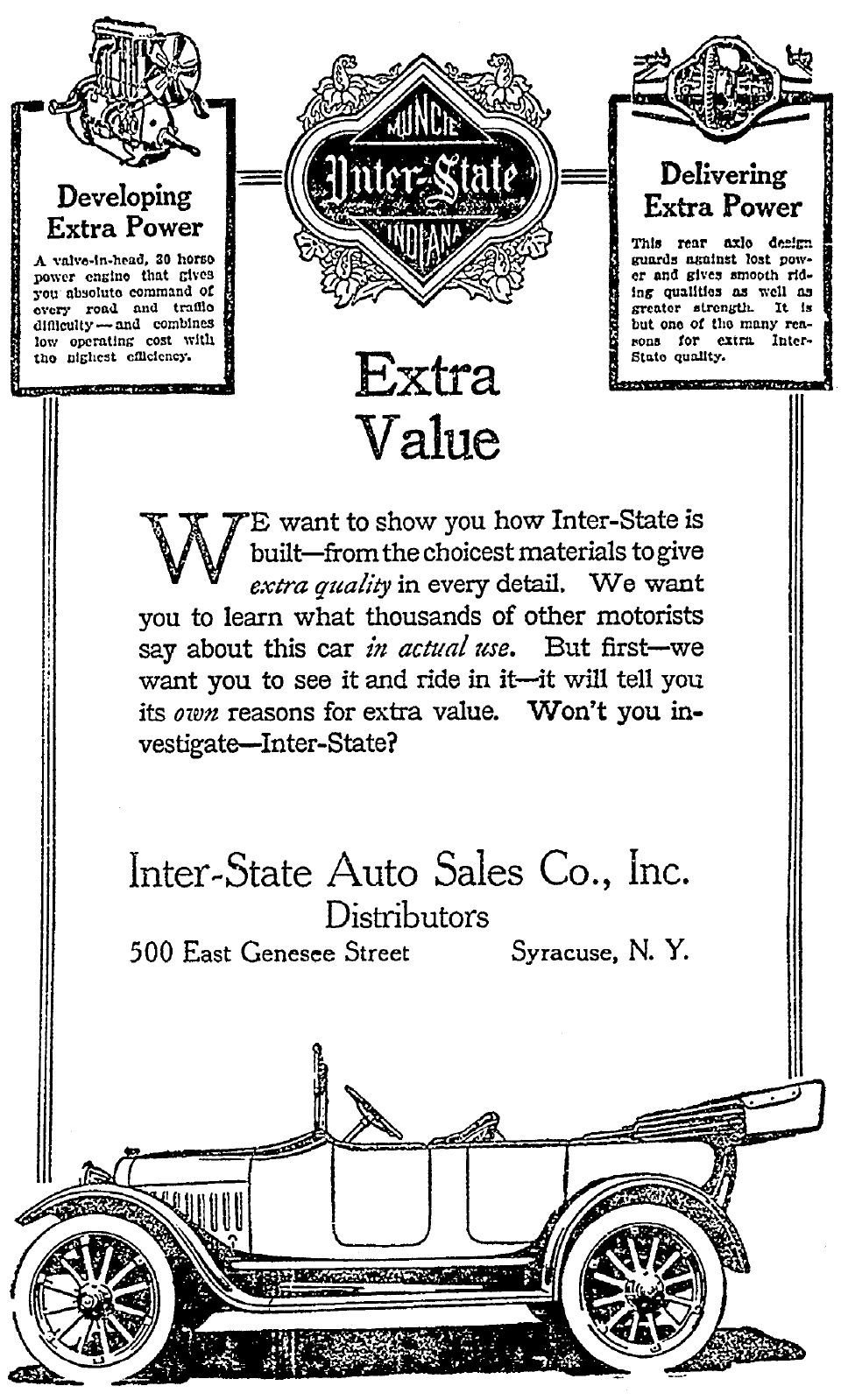
1916 Inter-State advertisement

== See also ==
- Interstate Motor Cars at ConceptCarz
