= American Simplex =

Defunct American motor vehicle manufacturer

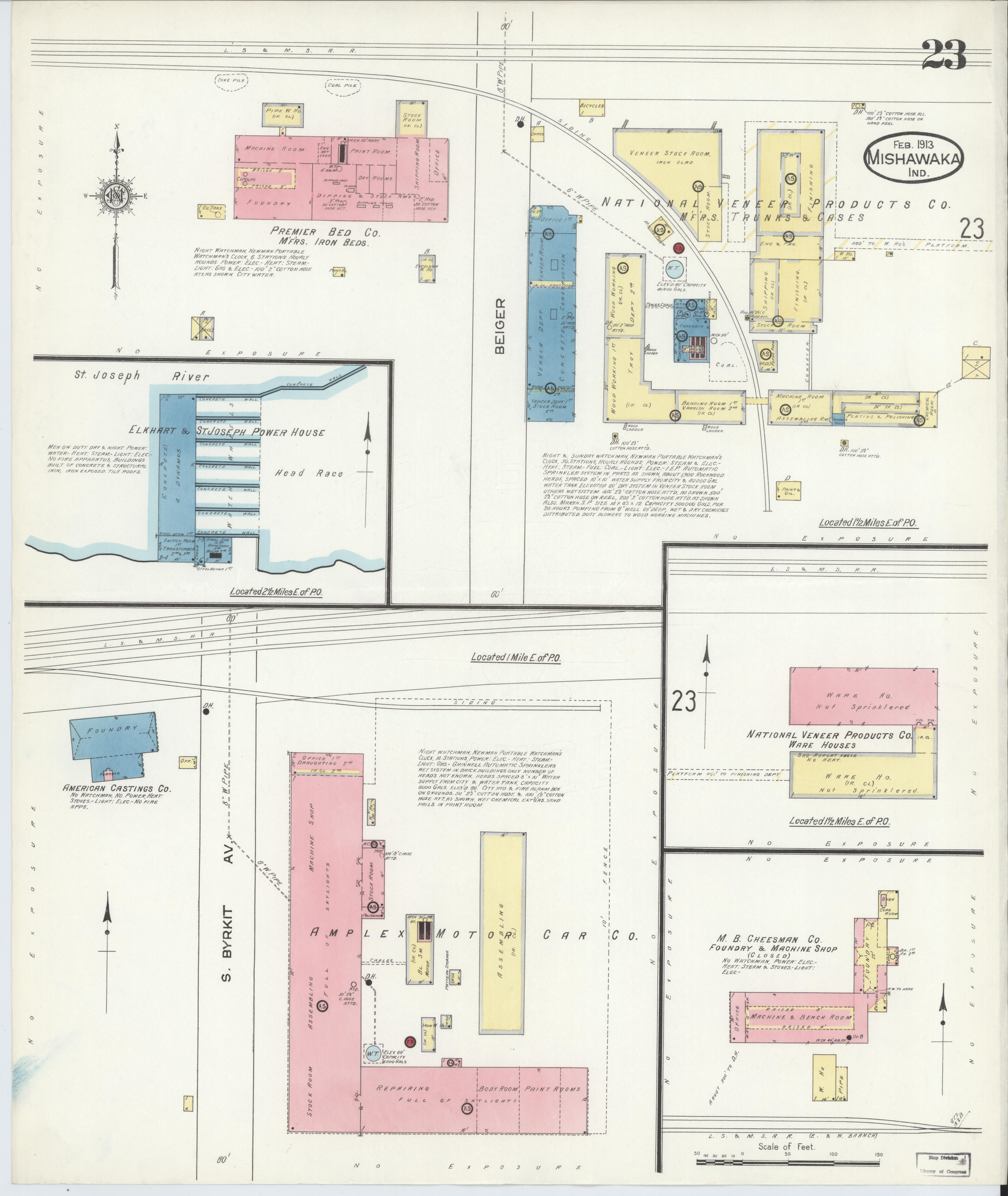
Amplex Motor Car Co. Plant (1913)

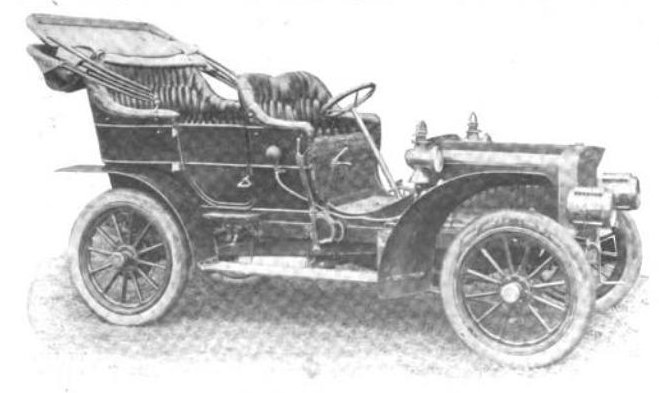
1906 American Simplex Touring Car

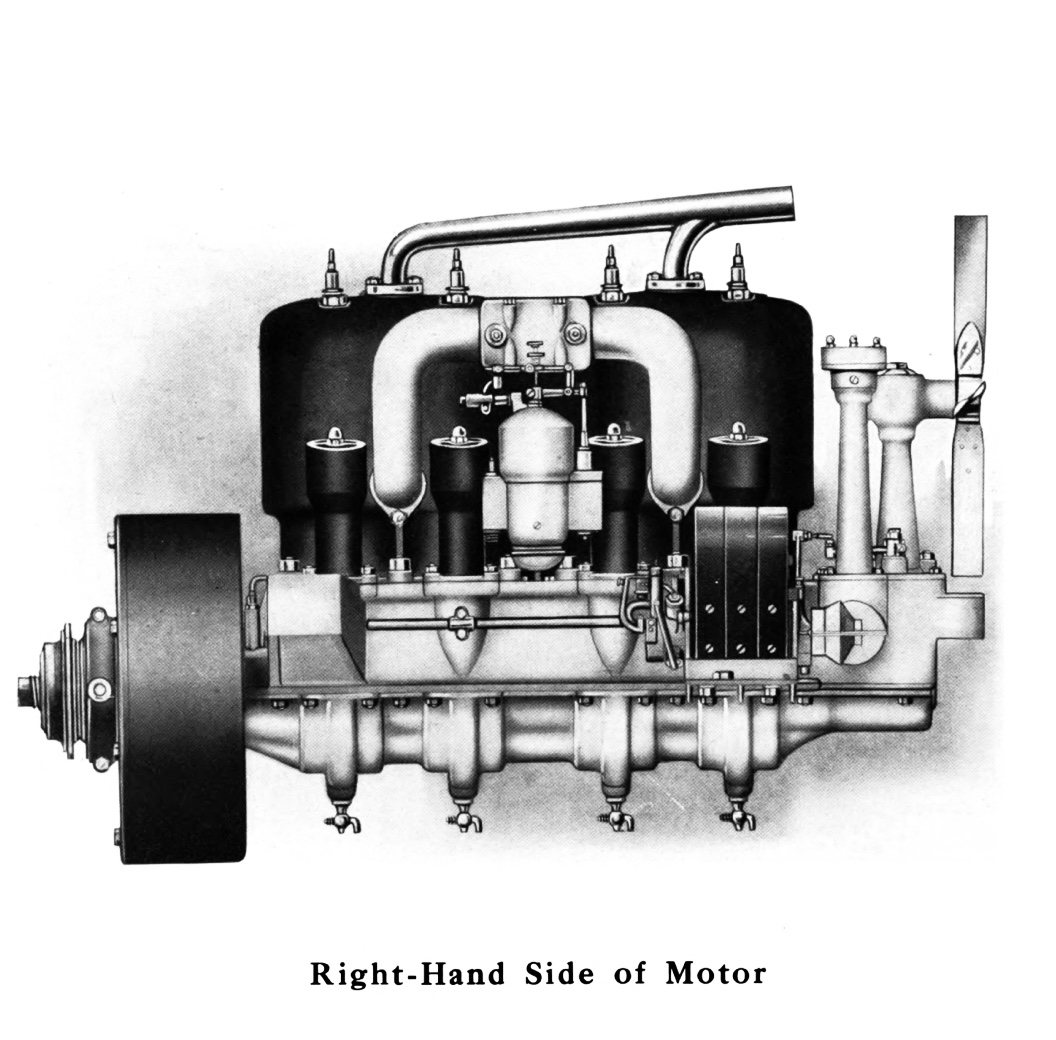
American Simplex 30-50 Hp Motor (1910).

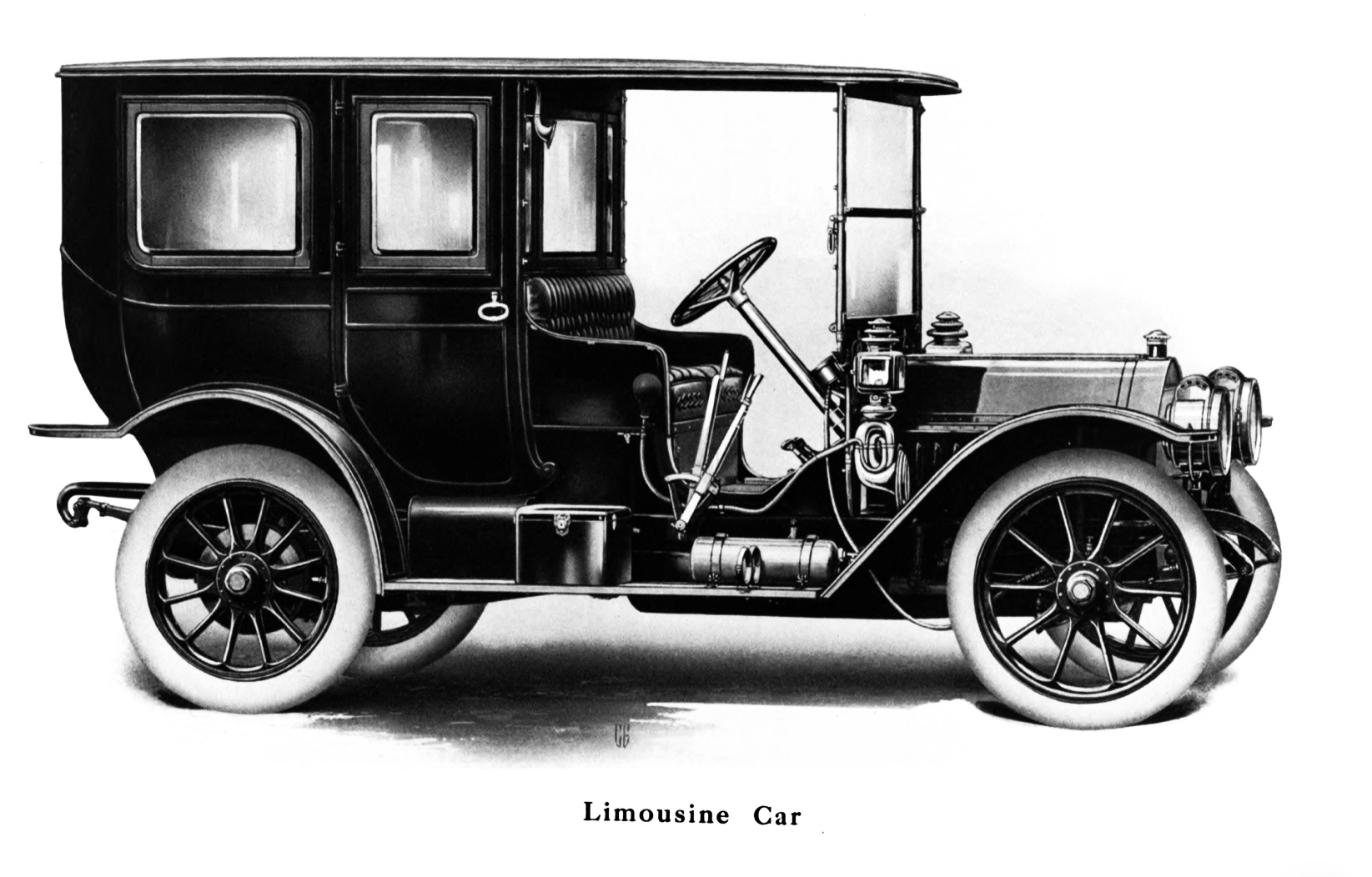
American Simplex 30/50 Hp Limousine Car (1910).

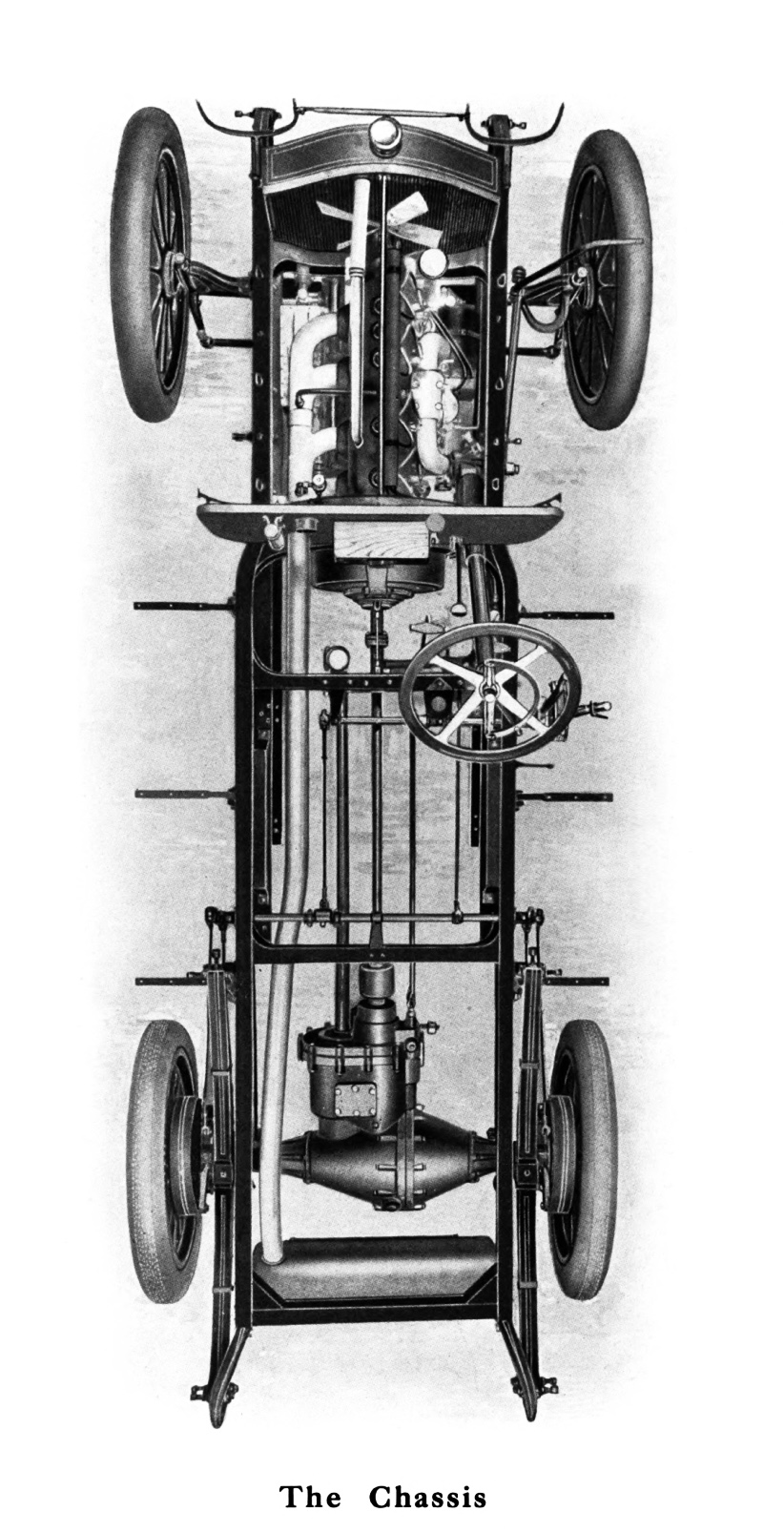
American Simplex 30/50 Hp Chassis (1910).

The American Simplex was an American automobile manufactured in Mishawaka, Indiana, from 1906 to 1915 by the Simplex Motor Car Company; the company shortened its product's name to Amplex in 1910 to avoid confusion with the better-known, New York-based Simplex car, made by the Simplex Automobile Company. This change also coincided with a reorganization of the company. Originally the company manufactured a two-stroke four-cylinder 50hp at 900 rpm from 6435 cc with 127 mm bore and 127 mm, later upsized to 6.8 liters and still rated at 50 hp. The top speed was 97 km/h (60 Miles per Hour). The wheelbase was 117 inches = 2972 mm. The gasoline tank held 20 gallons = 76 liters. In 1910, three open-roof models and two enclosed models were offered, costing up to $5,400; the newly introduced 30/50 hp Toy Tonneau, a long, sleek four-door touring car, sold for $4,300. The Amplex's most distinctive feature was its valveless motor, which the company claimed would offer more continuous pulling power and greater reliability. The 1910 models also offered self-starting, a feature that would not be available from major competitors, such as Cadillac, for another year or two.

They were expensive cars, a limousine being offered at as much as $5,600. Yet the firm kept using the two-stroke engine after it had become obsolete; a four-stroke was offered unsuccessfully in 1913. Gillette Motor Co took over the Amplex manufacturing facilities in 1916, but refused to manufacture conventional engine-valving, persisting with a rotary sleeve valve engine.
