= 1909 AAA Championship Car season =

Auto racing season

- AAA National Championship Trail

Season
- Races: 24
- Start date: June 12
- End date: November 6

Awards
- National champion: none declared

The 1909 AAA Championship Car season consisted of 24 races, beginning in Portland, Oregon on June 12 and concluding with a point-to-point race from Los Angeles, California to Phoenix, Arizona on November 6. There were three events sanctioned by the Automobile Club of America in Lowell, Massachusetts. AAA did not award points towards a National Championship during the 1909 season, and did not declare a National Champion.

== Schedule and results ==
Date	Race name Distance (miles)	Track	Location	Type	Notes	Pole position	Winning driver
June 12	Portland Race 1 (43.8)	Portland Road Race Course	Portland, Oregon	14.6 mile road course	Stock class, costing $1600 or under		Howard Covey
June 12	Portland Race 2 (43.8)	Portland Road Race Course	Portland, Oregon	14.6 mile road course	Limited to stock chassis of less than $3000		Charlie Arnold
June 12	Wemme Cup Race (102.2)	Portland Road Race Course	Portland, Oregon	14.6 mile road course	Free-For-All class.		Bert Dingley
June 18	Indiana Trophy Race (232.74)	Crown Point Road Race Circuit	Crown Point, Indiana	23.27 mile road course	Limited to stock chassis of maximum of 300 ci		Joe Matson
June 19	Cobe Trophy Race (395.65)	Crown Point Road Race Circuit	Crown Point, Indiana	23.27 mile road course	Limited to stock chassis of over 300 ci		Louis Chevrolet
July 5	Denver Trophy Race (290)	Brighton Road Race Course	Denver, Colorado	14.5 mile road course	Limited to stock chassis, Open engine		Eaton McMillan
July 10	Dick Ferris Trophy Race (202.42)	Santa Monica Road Race Course	Santa Monica, California	8.417 mile road course	Limited to stock chassis, light cars	Harris Hanshue	Harris Hanshue
July 10	Leon Shettler Trophy Race (202.42)	Santa Monica Road Race Course	Santa Monica, California	8.417 mile road course	Limited to stock chassis, heavy cars		Bert Dingley
August 19	Prest-O-Lite Trophy Race (250)	Indianapolis Motor Speedway	Indianapolis, Indiana	2.5 mile dirt oval	Stock chassis, 301–450 ci; William Bourque and his riding mechanic Harry Holcomb fatally injured		Bob Burman
August 20	G & J Trophy Race (100)	Indianapolis Motor Speedway	Indianapolis, Indiana	2.5 mile dirt oval	Stock chassis.		Lewis Strang
August 21	Wheeler-Schebler Trophy Race* (245)	Indianapolis Motor Speedway	Indianapolis, Indiana	2.5 mile dirt oval	Limited to stock chassis; Charles Merz broke through the outer fence, crashed into a crowd, and rolled over; his mechanician Claude Kellum was thrown out and died along with two spectators, Howard Jolliff and James West; others were injured		Leigh Lynch
September 6	Vesper Club Trophy Race** (212)	Merrimack Valley Course	Lowell, Massachusetts	10.6 mile road course	Limited to stock chassis, 301–450 ci	Lee Lorimer	Bob Burman
September 6	Yorick Club Trophy Race** (159)	Merrimack Valley Course	Lowell, Massachusetts	10.6 mile road course	Limited to stock chassis, 231–300 ci,	John Coffey	Louis Chevrolet
September 6	Merrimack Valley Trophy Race** (127.2)	Merrimack Valley Course	Lowell, Massachusetts	10.6 mile road course	Limited to stock chassis, 161–230 ci; Arthur Otis, a passer-by, who had entered the foggy race track, fatally struck by Joe Matson's car in practice	Joseph Grinnon	Billy Knipper
September 8	Lowell Trophy Race** (318)	Merrimack Valley Course	Lowell, Massachusetts	10.6 mile road course	Limited to stock chassis, 451–600 ci		George Robertson
September 29	Long Island Stock Car Derby A*** (227.5)	Riverhead Road Race Course	Riverhead, New York	22.75 mile road course	$4001 and over; James Bates, riding mechanic for Herbert Lytle, fatally injured		Ralph DePalma
September 29	Long Island Stock Car Derby Class B*** (182)	Riverhead Road Race Course	Riverhead, New York	22.75 mile road course	$3001–4000		Frank Lescault
September 29	Long Island Stock Car Derby Class C*** (136.5)	Riverhead Road Race Course	Riverhead, New York	22.75 mile road course	$2001–3000		William Sharp
September 29	Long Island Stock Car Derby Class D*** (113.75)	Riverhead Road Race Course	Riverhead, New York	22.75 mile road course	$1251–2000		Louis Chevrolet
September 29	Long Island Stock Car Derby Class E*** (91)	Riverhead Road Race Course	Riverhead, New York	22.75 mile road course	$851–1250		Arthur See
October 9	Founder's Week Trophy Race (202.5)	Fairmount Park	Philadelphia, Pennsylvania	8 mile road course	Stock Chassis		George Robertson
October 23	Portola Festival Race (258.16)	Portola Road Race Circuit	San Leandro, California	21.18 mile road course	A tire which had flown off Howard Hall's car knocked down a spectator, Peter McKiterick, who later succumbed to his injuries.		Jack Fleming
October 30	William K. Vanderbilt Cup (278)	Long Island Motor Parkway	Long Island, New York	12.64 mile road course	Limited to stock chassis, 301–600 ci	Lewis Strang	Harry Grant
November 6	Cactus Derby (480)	Los Angeles to Phoenix	California to Phoenix	Point to Point	Limited to stock chassis		Joe Nikrent; Louis Nikrent

* Race halted at 235 miles due to track breaking up. AAA report states that race was halted at 245 miles.

** Event sanctioned by Automobile Club of America, 301–450, 231–300 & 161–230 run simultaneously.

*** All classes run simultaneously.

== Unofficial, retroactive, and revisionist champions ==
The contemporary de facto National Champion as polled by the American automobile journal Motor Age, was Bert Dingley. Dingley was named the champion by Chris G. Sinsabaugh, an editor at Motor Age, based upon merit and on track performance.

In 1927, the AAA Contest Board retroactively applied the 1920 points table to the 1909 through 1915 and 1917 through 1919 seasons, scoring Dingley as champion. In 1951, well-published sportswriter Russ Catlin decided to revise these retroactive standings. Catlin attempted to strip Dingley of the title, awarding it instead to George Robertson. In the 1980s, it was recognized by historians that these retroactive championship revisions should not be considered official.

== See also ==
American Championship car racing

== General references ==
- http://www.champcarstats.com/year/1909.htm accessed September 16, 2010
- accessed September 16, 2010
- https://web.archive.org/web/20111226011449/http://www.motorsport.com/stats/champ/byyear.asp?Y=1909 accessed September 16, 2010
