= 1911 AAA Championship Car season =

Auto racing season

- AAA National Championship Trail

Season
- Races: 21
- Start date: February 22
- End date: November 30

Awards
- National champion: none declared
- Indianapolis 500 winner: (United States) Ray Harroun

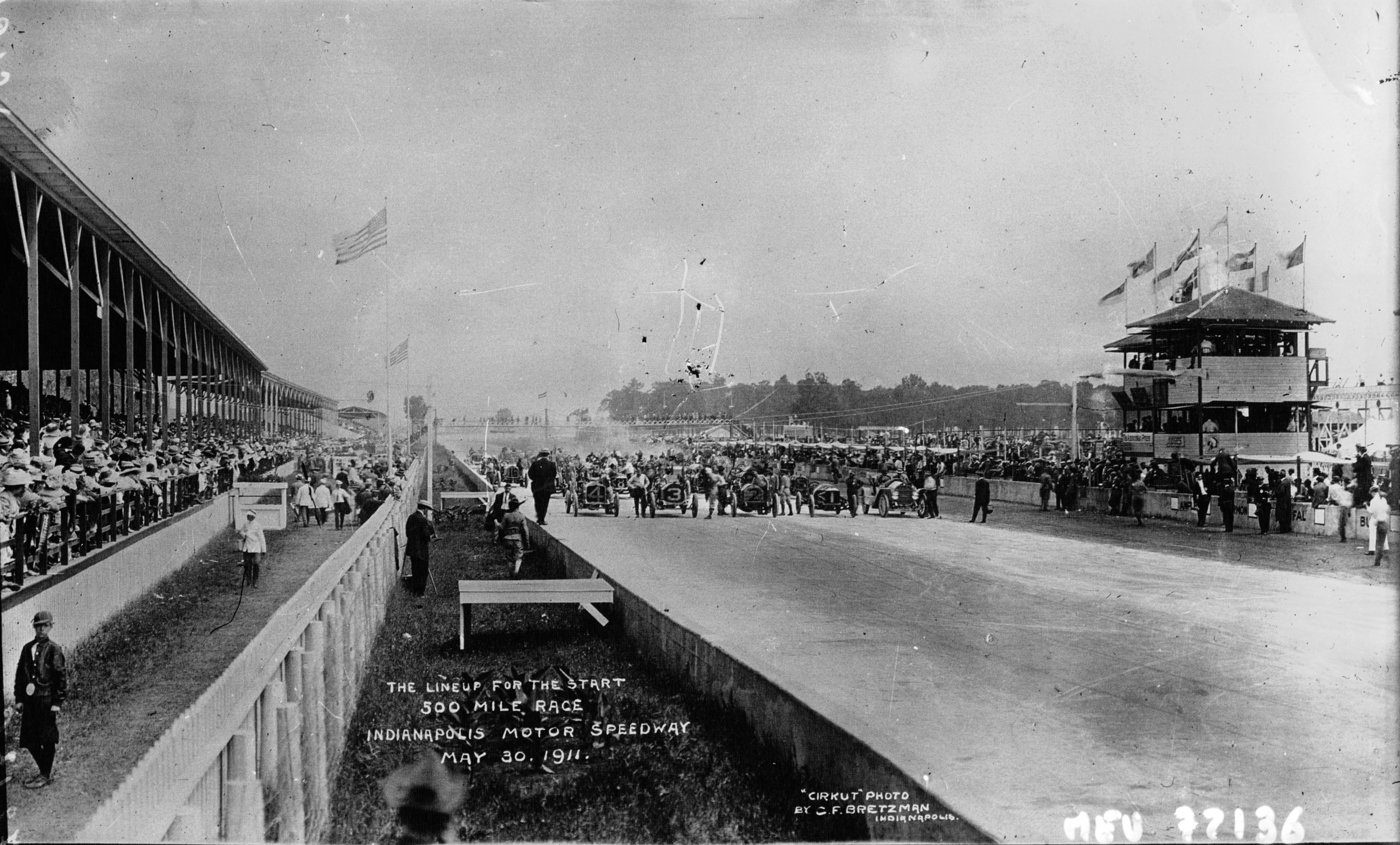
Starting line-up at the Indianapolis Motor Speedway, May 30, 1911

The 1911 AAA Championship Car season consisted of 21 races, beginning in Oakland, California on February 22 and concluding in Savannah, Georgia on November 30. AAA did not award points towards a National Championship during the 1911 season, and did not declare a National Champion. Ray Harroun was the winner of the inaugural Indianapolis 500.

The de facto National Champion as polled by the American automobile journal Motor Age, was Harvey Herrick. Points were not awarded by the AAA Contest Board during the 1911 season. Herrick was named the champion by Chris G. Sinsabaugh, an editor at Motor Age, based upon merit and on track performance. A points table was created retroactively in 1927, naming Ralph Mulford as champion. At a later point, it was recognized by historians that these championship results should be considered unofficial.

== Schedule and results ==
Date	Race Name Distance (miles)	Track	Location	Type	Notes	Pole position	Winning driver
February 22	Oakland Trophy (98)	Portola Road Race Course	Oakland, California	10.923-mile road course	Open to cars under 300 cu in displacement.		Charles Bigelow
February 22	St. Francis Hotel Trophy Race (153)	Portola Road Race Course	Oakland, California	10.923-mile road course	Open to cars 301–600 cu in displacement		Charles Merz
February 22	Panama-Pacific Race (164)	Portola Road Race Course	Oakland, California	10.923-mile road course	Free-for-all, Stopped after 15 of 19 laps for darkness	Jack Fleming	Bert Dingley
March 28	Jacksonville Race (100)	Pablo Beach Course	Jacksonville Beach, Florida	5 mile beach oval	600 cu in or less and 2300 pounds minimum weight.		Louis Disbrow
May 30	International 500 Mile Sweepstakes	Indianapolis Motor Speedway	Speedway, Indiana	2.5 mile brick oval	Qualifications based upon demonstrated 75 mph main stretch speed, 40-car field; Sam Dickson, riding mechanic for Arthur Greiner, fatally injured	Lewis Strang	Ray Harroun
July 4	Tevis Cup Race (145)	Bakersfield Road Race Course	Bakersfield, California	11.15 Mile Road Course			Harvey Herrick
August 25	Kane County Trophy Race* (169)	Elgin Road Race Course	Elgin, Illinois	8.47 Mile Road Course	Entrants limited to cars 231–300 in^{3}; Ralph Ireland fatally injured in practice		Hughie Hughes
August 25	Illinois Trophy Race* (203)	Elgin Road Race Course	Elgin, Illinois	8.47 Mile Road Course	Entrants limited to cars 301 to 450 in^{3}		Don Herr
August 26	Elgin National Trophy Race (305)	Elgin Road Race Course	Elgin, Illinois	8.47 Mile Road Course	<600 ci, Grandstand collapse on lap 2, restarted 35 minutes later; Dave Buck and his riding mechanic Sam Jacobs fatally injured		Len Zengel
September 9	Hamilton County Trophy Race* (150)	Cincinnati Road Race Course	Cincinnati, Ohio	7.9 Mile Road Course	Stock chassis, 300 cu in and under.		John Jenkins
September 9	Cincinnati Trophy Race* (200)	Cincinnati Road Race Course	Cincinnati, Ohio	7.9 Mile Road Course	Free-for-all class, 600 ci and under		Eddie Hearne
October 9	Philadelphia Race 1* (200)	Fairmount Park	Philadelphia, Pennsylvania	8.1 Mile Road Course	limited to cars with 600–750 ci		Erwin Bergdoll
October 9	Philadelphia Race 2* (200)	Fairmount Park	Philadelphia, Pennsylvania	8.1 Mile Road Course	limited to cars with 451–600 ci		Ralph Mulford
October 9	Philadelphia Race 3* (200)	Fairmount Park	Philadelphia, Pennsylvania	8.1 Mile Road Course	limited to cars with 301–450 ci		Louis Disbrow
October 9	Philadelphia Race 4* (200)	Fairmount Park	Philadelphia, Pennsylvania	8.1 Mile Road Course	limited to cars with 231–300 ci		Hughie Hughes
October 14	Chanslor & Lyon Trophy Race (100)	Santa Monica Road Race Course	Santa Monica, California	8.417 Mile Road Course	Stock chassis, 230 cu in.	Charles Soules	Louis Nikrent
October 14	Jepsen Trophy Race (150)	Santa Monica Road Race Course	Santa Monica, California	8.417 Mile Road Course	231–300 ci, Run Concurrently with 301–450 ci		Bruce Keen
October 14	Leon Shettler Cup Race (150)	Santa Monica Road Race Course	Santa Monica, California	8.417 Mile Road Course	301–450 ci, Run Concurrently with 231–300 ci	Bert Dingley	Charles Merz
October 14	Dick Ferris Trophy Race (200)	Santa Monica Road Race Course	Santa Monica, California	8.417 Mile Road Course	Free-For-All	Howdy Wilcox	Harvey Herrick
November 27	William K. Vanderbilt Cup (290)	Savannah-Effingham Raceway	Savannah, Georgia	17.1-mile road course	Jay McNay and his riding mechanic Henry Maxwell fatally injured in practice	Harry Grant	Ralph Mulford
November 30	American Grand Prize (410)	Savannah-Effingham Raceway	Savannah, Georgia	17.1-mile road course	ACA sanction		David Bruce-Brown

* Events on same date were run simultaneously.

== Leading National Championship standings ==
The points paying system for the 1909–1915 and 1917–1919 season were retroactively applied in 1927 and revised in 1951 using the points system from 1920.

#	Driver	Sponsor	Points
1	Ralph Mulford	Lozier	1520
2	Charles Merz	National	1080
3	David Bruce-Brown	Fiat	1070
4	Ray Harroun	Marmon	1000
5	Hughie Hughes	Mercer	870

== General references ==
- 1911 AAA National Championship Trail accessed 9/24/10
- Winners 1909-1919 accessed 9/24/10
- accessed 9/24/10
