= Crane-Simplex =

Defunct American motor vehicle manufacturer

Crane-Simplex Company
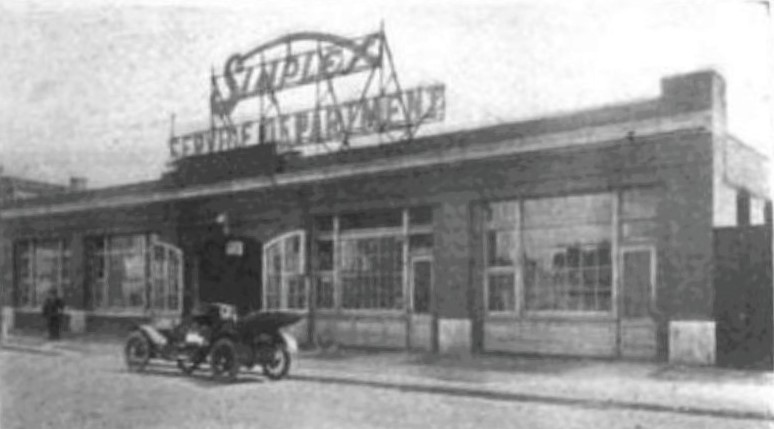
- Simplex Service building in Queens, New York. Crane-Simplex factory was here in 1922. A portion of the building is extant at Vernon Blvd and 12th Street.
- Formerly: Simplex Automobile Company
- Industry: Automotive
- Founded: 1922; 104 years ago
- Founder: Henry M. Crane
- Defunct: 1923; 103 years ago
- Fate: Discontinued
- Headquarters: Long Island City, New York, United States
- Key people: Henry M. Crane
- Products: Automobiles
- Production output: very few (1922-1923)
- Brands: Crane-Simplex

Crane-Simplex was the common name of the Simplex Crane Model 5 luxury automobile, produced by the Simplex Automobile Company in New Brunswick, New Jersey, from 1915 to 1918.

Crane-Simplex Company was formed in 1922 in Long Island City, New York, by Henry M. Crane to resume production of the luxury car.

== Crane-Simplex Company ==
Wright-Martin sold the Simplex Automobile Company assets to Mercer Motors Company controlled by Emlen S. Hare in 1920. In July 1921 Hare's Motors announced it would be dissolved and the separate units would reorganize as individual companies. Simplex which was still not producing cars, reverted to Mercer ownership. By July 1922, a reorganization of Mercer Motors and reversal of its arrangements with Hare Motors was finally completed.

Organized on September 20, 1922, Henry M. Crane announced the Crane-Simplex Company with the Long Island City, Queens, New York plant and assets being purchased from Mercer Motors, Inc., "with plans to revive his masterpiece" Capitalized at $500,000, company offices were located at the United States Realty Building at 115 Broadway, with L. R. Ayers as President. John B. Bawden, Jr., formerly with Mercer was vice-president and general manager. Harvey B. Clark and Frederick H. Brand, formerly with Simplex were treasurer and assistant treasurer, respectively.

Crane-Simplex had controlling interest of Jephson-Scott Body Company which was the successor of the J. M. Qumby & Company. Plans for 100 automobile chassis production per year were announced. Crane-Simplex stated bodies could be fitted from the Jephson-Scott factory in East Orange, NJ, although that was not required.

In 1922 Jordan Motor Car Company listed the Jordan Touring Model MX with Crane Simplex running gear. Although Crane-Simplex was still listed as a company in 1926, no chassis manufacturing is recorded after 1923.

In July 1922 Henry M. Crane became a consulting engineer and technical assistant to Alfred P. Sloan of General Motors.

== Simplex Crane Model 5 ==
Simple Crane Model 5 Crane-Simplex
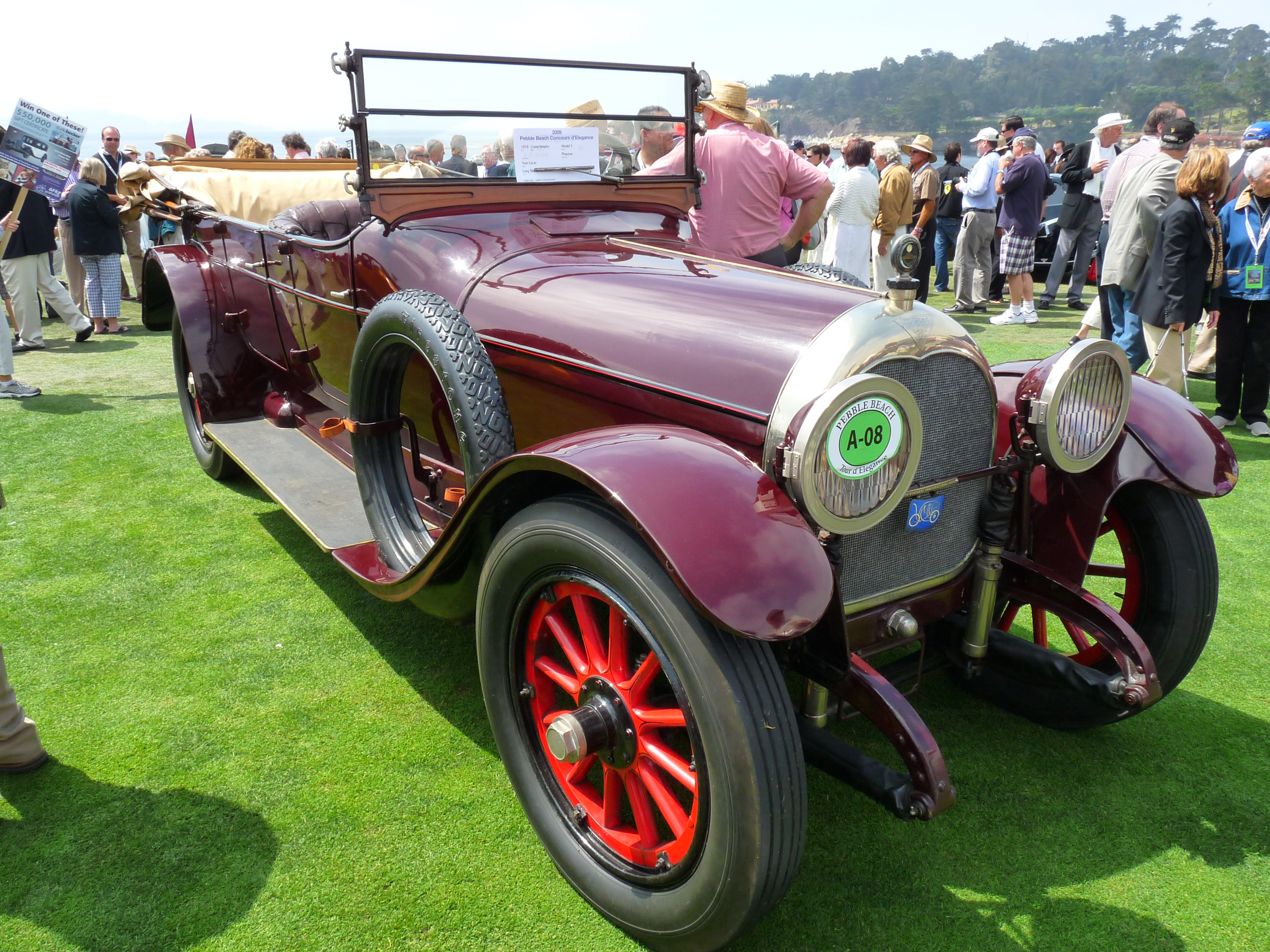
- 1916 Simplex Crane Model 5 Phaeton coachwork by Frederick R. Wood & Sons

Overview
- Type: Passenger car
- Manufacturer: Simplex Automobile Company
- Also called: Crane-Simplex
- Production: 1915-1918
- Assembly: New Brunswick, New Jersey
- Designer: Henry M. Crane

Body and chassis
- Class: Luxury car

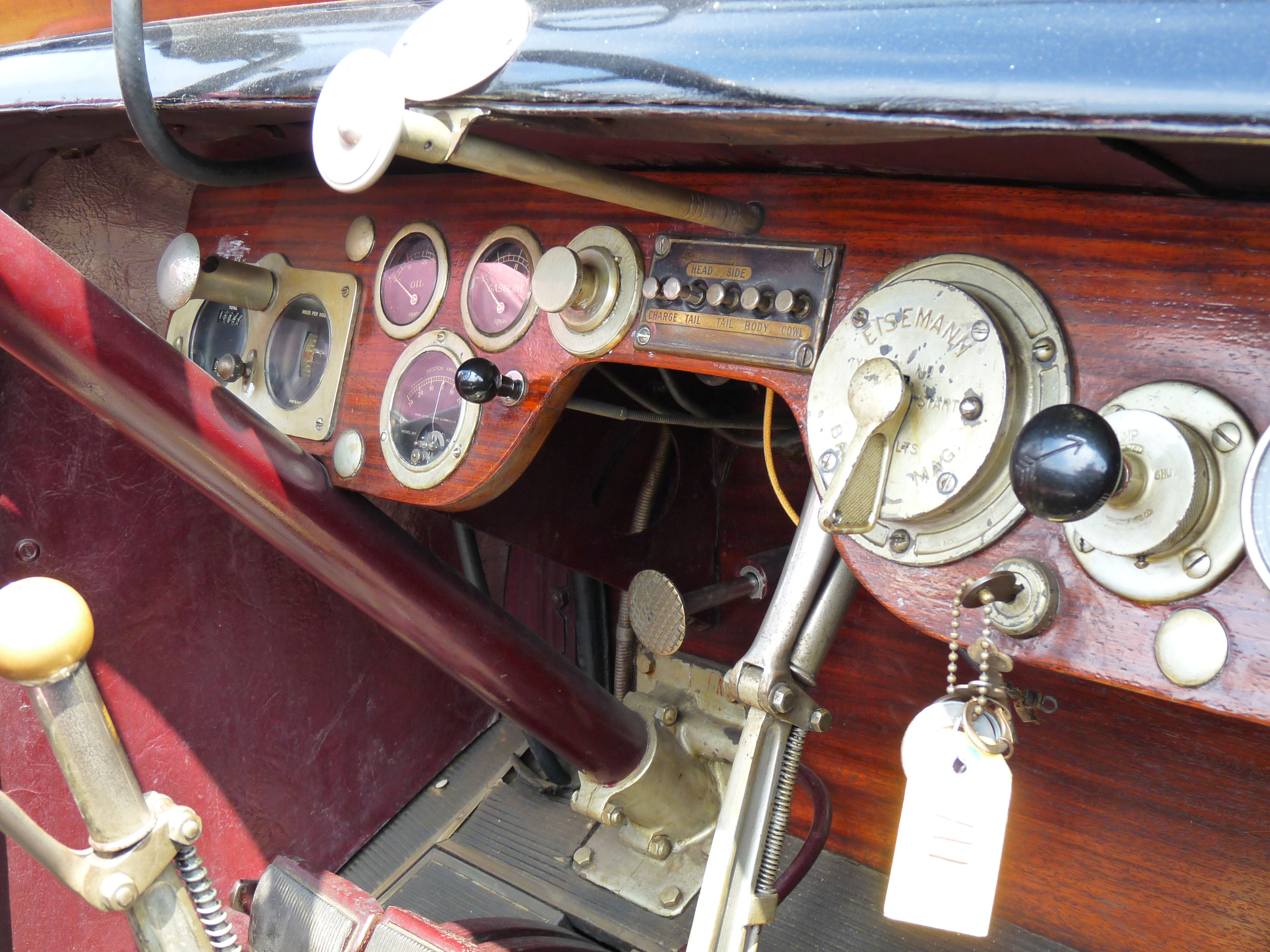
Interior - Dashboard Simplex Crane Model 5

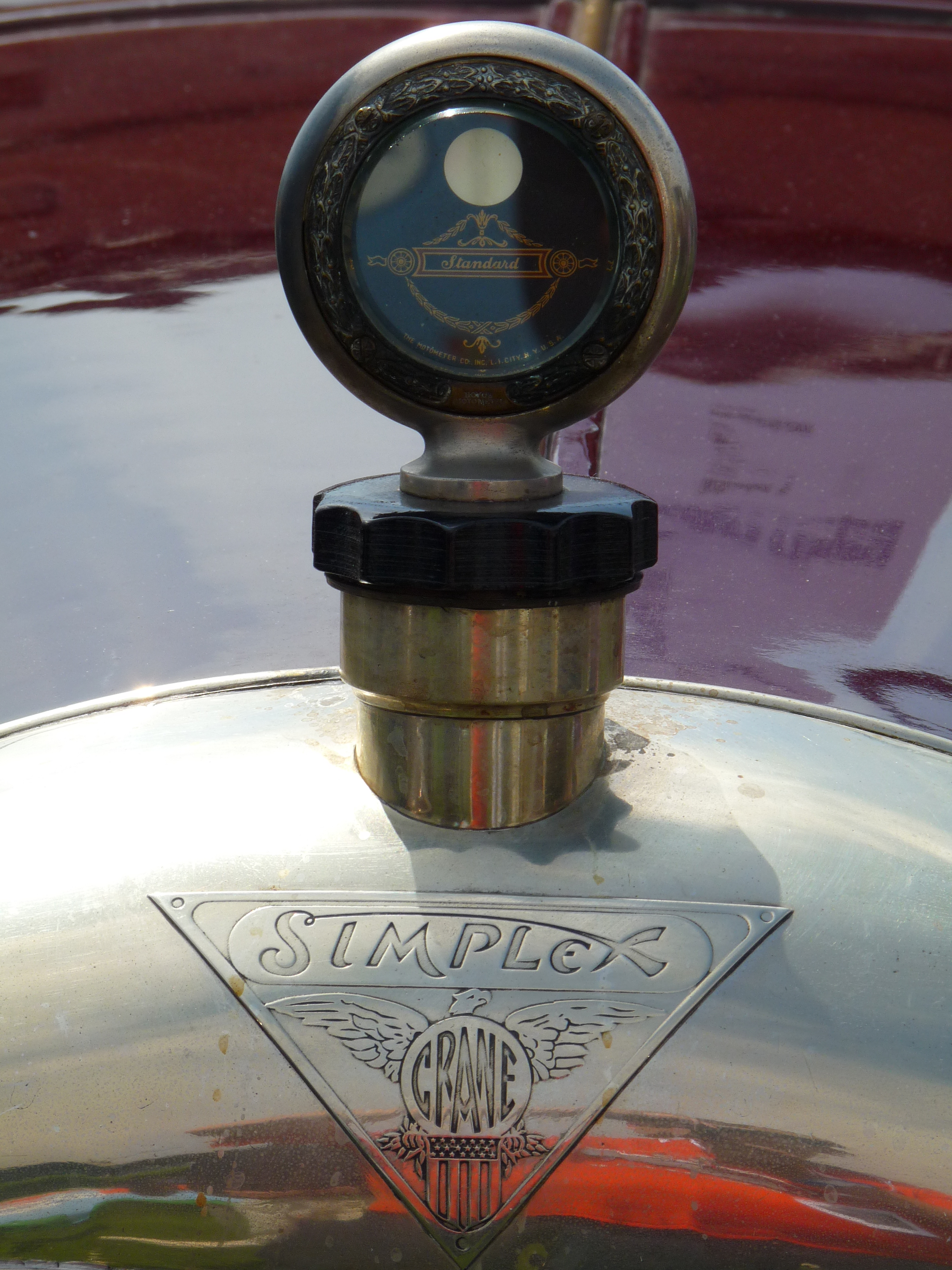
1916 Crane-Simplex Model 5.

The Crane Motor Company of Bayonne, New Jersey built automobiles from 1912 to 1915. The Crane Model 3 was a six-cylinder car offered only as a chassis. The chassis was priced at $8,000 (equivalent to $260,606 in 2025), the highest priced American chassis on the market. Crane favored Brewster & Company as a coachbuilder and most Crane automobiles were bodied by that firm. Only about 20 Crane Model 3s were made in 1912 and 1913. By 1914, a Model 4 was produced by Crane. It differed in having the six cylinders cast in two blocks of three instead of three pairs.

In late 1914, the Simplex Automobile Company of New Brunswick, New Jersey bought Crane Motor Car Company to acquire his engineering advances. The Crane factory in Bayonne was sold to the Car Lighting & Power Company in August 1915. Simplex was the maker of "one of the finest and most exclusive luxury cars built in the USA before World War I." Crane became vice president and engineer for Simplex.

The Crane Model 4, became the Simplex Crane Model 5. From the beginning of the announcement of the Simplex purchase of Crane, The Automobile magazine referred to the new car as Crane-Simplex, only mentioning later in the September 1915 article that it was the Crane model of Simplex The article describes the new six cylinder shaft driven car with 100-hp at 2000-rpm. In the August 1916 Automobile Topics magazine 2- page article, the new cars was described as the "Model 5 Simplex-Crane -- or plain Simplex". Although never official, the Simplex Crane Model 5 would often be referred to as the Crane-Simplex.

Crane created a new car called the Crane Model 46 H.P. Six-Cylinder Simplex or the Simplex-Crane Model 5, which was similar to his Crane Model 4, but on a longer wheelbase. The Model 5 was "fitted with a six-cylinder motor of 563 cubic inches piston displacement, developing a maximum of 110 h.p. The cylinders are of the L-head type and are cast in blocks of three, with the value springs fully enclosed." This 5,300-pound car was fast—reaching up to 65 or 68 miles per hour. Owners also expected a smooth ride and effortless performance. This was achieved with a new design for springs that reduced lateral shock when a wheel went into a pothole or if the driver took a curve at a high speed. At the time, a newspaper reported, "The six-cylinder power plant on which the Crane-Simplex Company has established its reputation for mechanical excellence, is the result of H. M. Crane's engineering genius."

Between 1915 and 1916, Crane designed and oversaw the fabrication of Crane-Simplex automobiles at the New Brunswick factory. Production was limited to 300 cars per year, the maximum output of the company's 800 employees who worked in three shifts, day and night. Each engine went through the equivalent of 1,000 miles of road travel on a belt test that took 36 hours, as well as a block test of 48 hours. The engines were tested for speed on the Vanderbilt track in Long Island. Other road tests included driving on bumpy surfaces, in sand, and in the mountains. In total, each engine was tested for the equivalent of 5,000 miles of travel before going to the customer. "The car had to be right or Mr. Crane would not send it out," according to Walter B. Reynolds who was chief of the final road testing department for Simplex-Crane.

Each Crane-Simplex was custom-built and high-priced for its era; the chassis was introduced at $5,000 (equivalent to $159,128 in 2025) in 1915, increased to $6,000 in 1917, and to $7,000 (equivalent to $175,909 in 2025) in 1918. The Model 5 chassis included a complete dashboard with instrumentation, front fenders, trimmed running boards, Goodrich Silvertown cord tires, an electric horn, headlamps, a reel-mounted trouble lamp, taillamp, a jack, and tools. Based on the company's catalog, customers could choose between a limousine, landaulette-limousine, touring landaulette, and enclosed bodied coach to add to their chassis. However, the seven-passenger touring model by Brewster & Company coachworks was the only body that went into regular production. Other coachbuilders for Crane-Simplex customers include A. T. Demarest and Co., Healey & Co., and Holbrook Co. Adding a coach to the chassis cost $1,500 for the seven-passenger touring body or $2,000 for a custom coach.

In 1916, one of the company's executives noted, "We make the highest price car in the world." However, it did have a market; as Horseless Age magazine wrote in its review of the Simplex-Crane Model 5, "There are always people who want only the very best and are willing to pay a good price for what to the ordinary purchaser may seem minor advantages." John D. Rockefeller purchased two Simplex-Crane Model 5 cars, decked with summer and winter bodies. Other owners of a Crane-Simplex automobile included Alfred Atmore Pope, Theodate Pope Riddle, John D. Rockefeller, Jr., Herbert L. Satterlee, and Frederick William Vanderbilt. In 1936, Satterlee invited Crane to drive his Simplex-Crane Model 5 as its odometer turned to 300,000 miles.

In October 1915, the Wright Company of Garwood, New Jersey entered into an agreement to purchase Crane-Simplex. Car production at New Brunswick ceased in October 1917 as Wright began making airplane engines for World War I. In all, 467 Simplex Crane Model 5s were produced.

In January 1920, the Mercer Motor Company of Trenton, NJ, under the control of Emlen S. Hare, absorbed the assets of the Simplex Automobile Company. Automobile equipment was relocated to the Vernon Avenue building in Queens which had been used as a service department. In February 1920 Hare's Motors, Incorporated was organized to take over the assets of Locomobile, Mercer, and Simplex. In July 1921, Hare's motors announced it would be dissolved and the separate units would reorganize as individual companies. Simplex, which was still not producing cars, reverted to Mercer ownership. By July 1922, a reorganization of Mercer Motors and reversal of its arrangements with Hare Motors was finally completed.

== Simplex Crane Model 5 Gallery ==
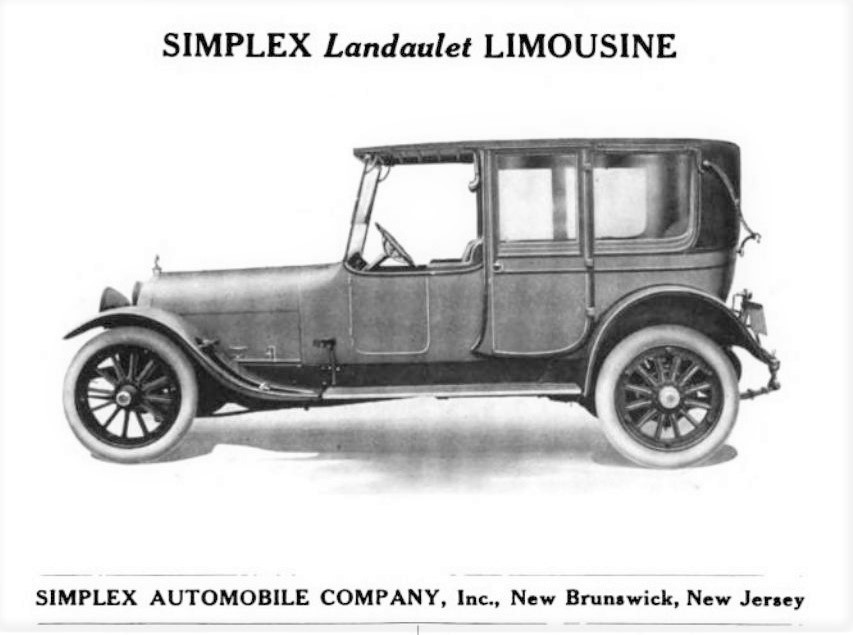
1916 Simplex Crane Model 5 - Landaulet Limousine

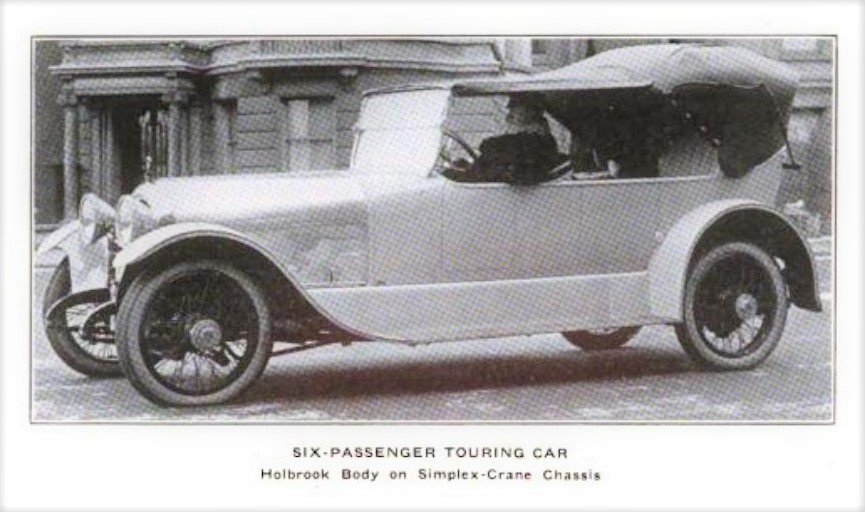
1917 Simplex Crane Model 5 - Holbrook Touring body

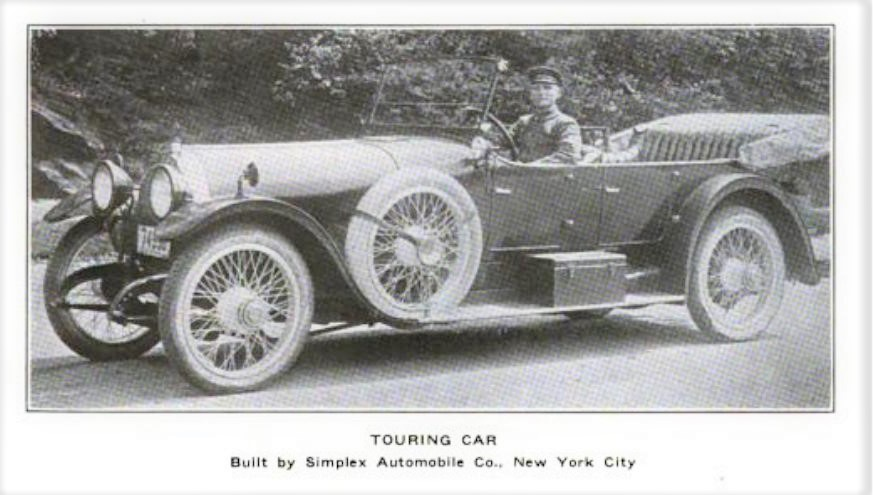
1917 Simplex Crane Model 5 - Simplex Touring body

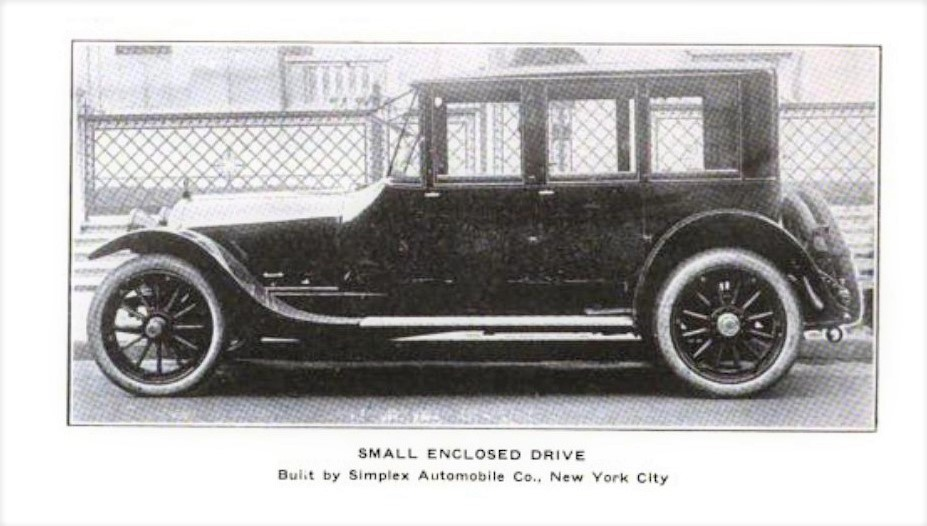
1917 Simplex Crane Model 5 - Simplex Enclosed Drive body

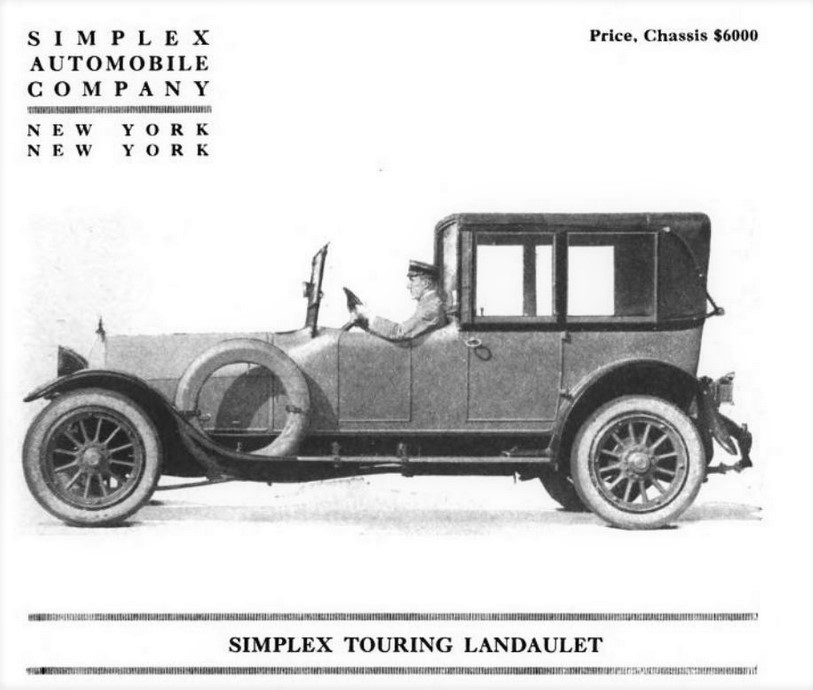
1917 Simplex Crane Model 5 - Stone Landaulet body

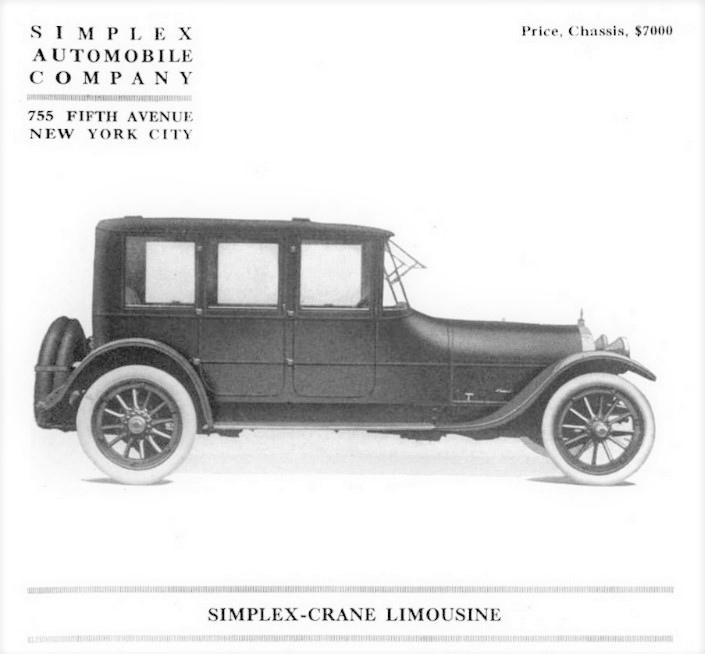
1918 Simplex Crane Model 5 - Simplex Limousine body. This image was used again for the 1921 Handbook of Automobiles.

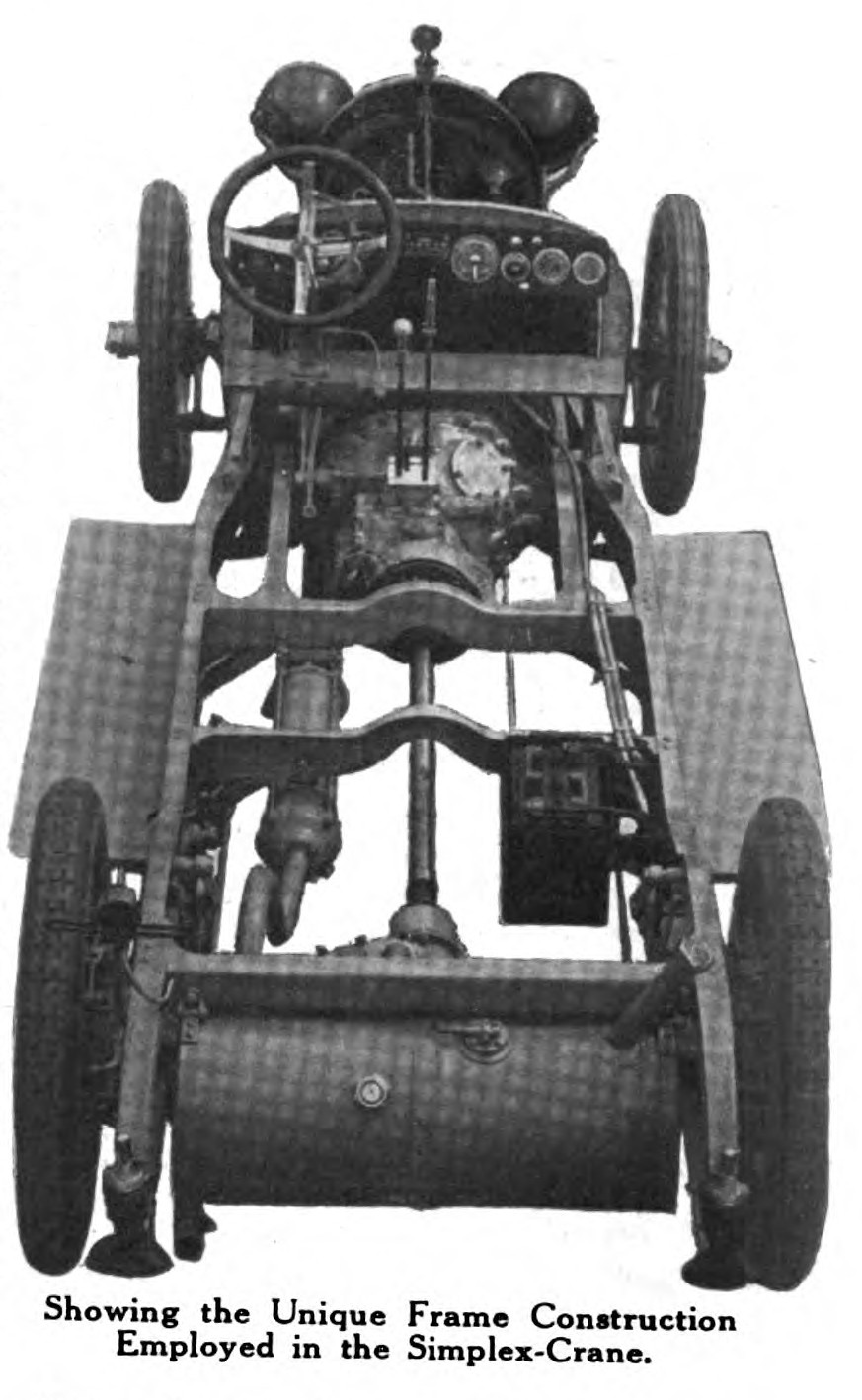
Simplex-Crane chassis, 1915

== Crane-Simplex - Simplex Crane Model 5 advertisements ==
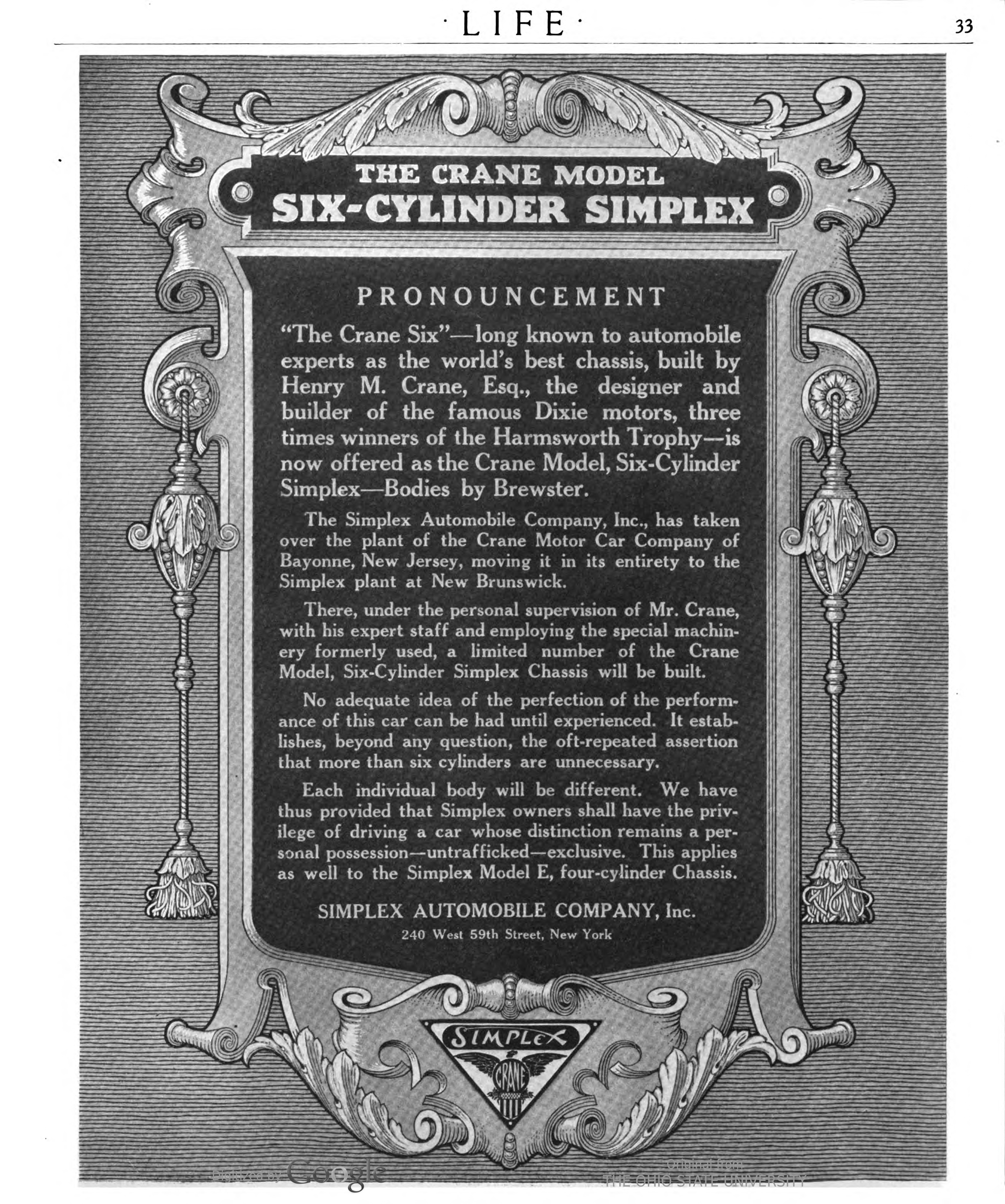
1915 Crane Model Six-Cylinder Simplex advertisement in Life

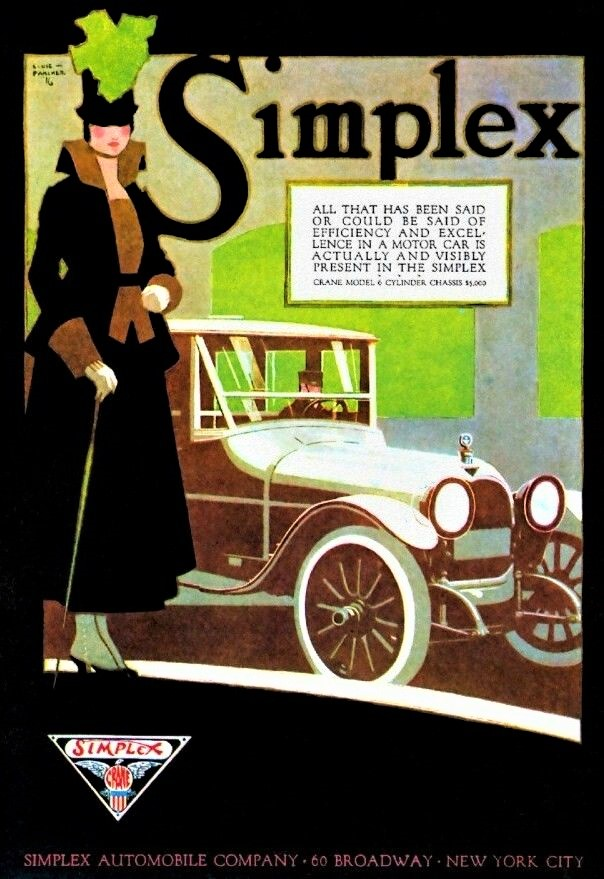
1915 Simplex Crane Model advertisement in Life

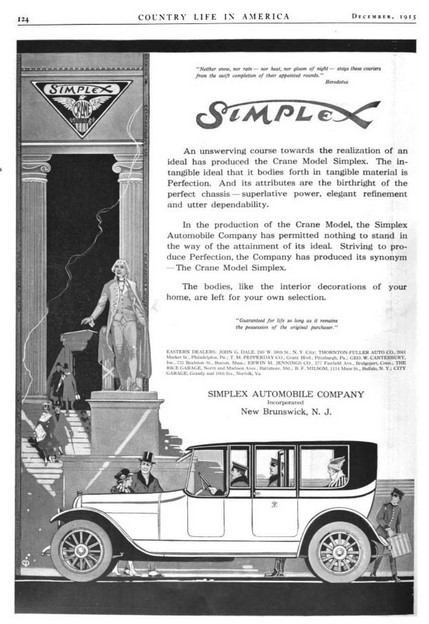
1915 Simplex Crane Model advertisement in Country Life

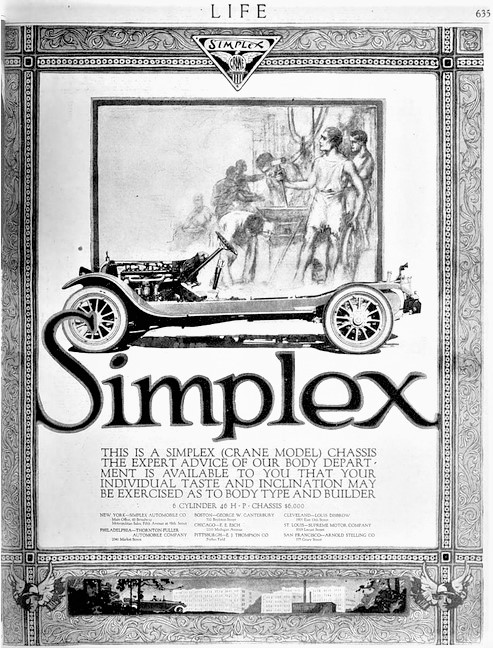
1916 Simplex (Crane Model) advertisement in Life

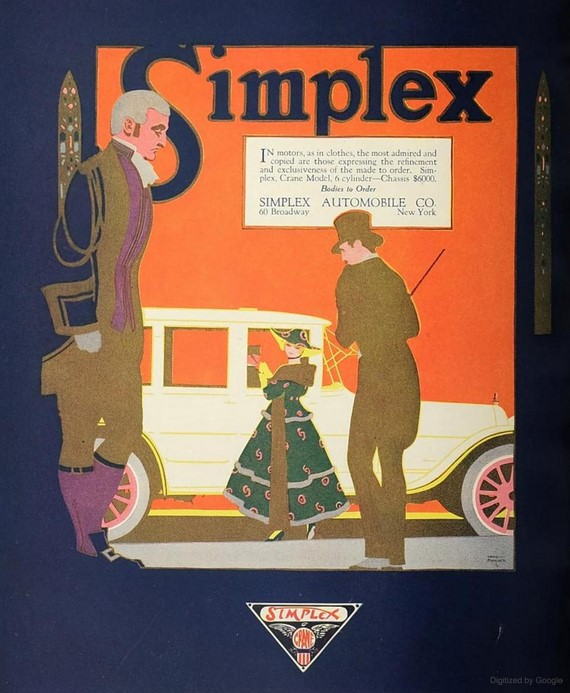
1916 Simplex Crane Model advertisement in Life Christmas edition

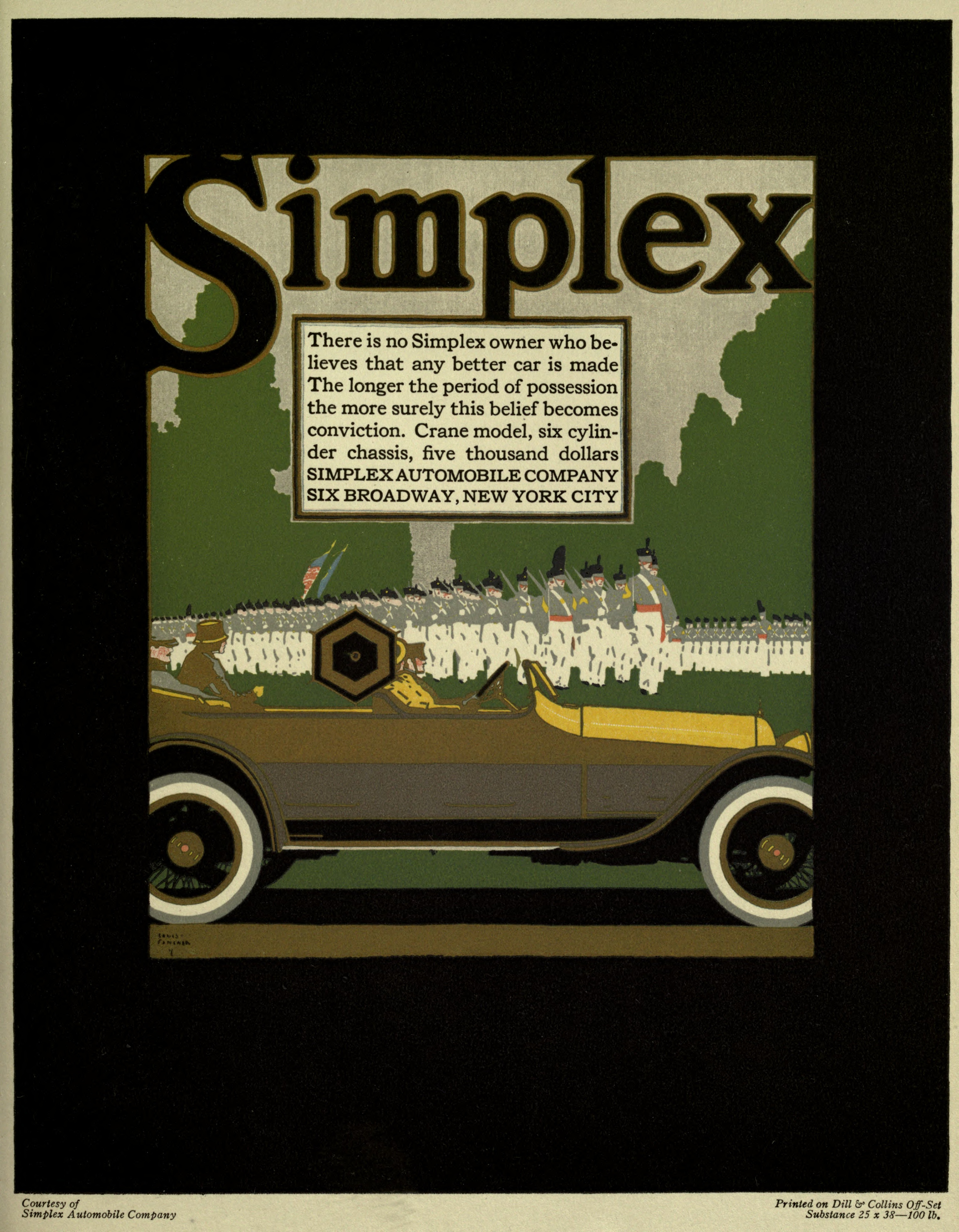
1917 Simplex Crane Model poster by Louis Fancher

== Notable cars ==
- 1915 Roadster - believed to be the only Simplex roadster ever made, with 110 horsepower (82 kW)
- 1915 Sport Berline Brewster - personal car of Henry Crane and built for 1915 New York Auto Show, sold new for $13,800
- 1916 Model 5 Holbrook Skiff - built for 1916 New York Auto Show with yacht-inspired design, (including doors in the middle rather than beside passengers and a propeller in back) soon purchased at the San Francisco Auto Show, now owned by Jay Leno
- 1918 Crane-Simplex - owned by John D. Rockefeller, had two Brewster bodies, for summer and winter seasons, now one of the last surviving Rockefeller family cars
- 1918 Model 5 Prince of Wales Limousine, coachwork by Brooks-Ostruk - built for Frederick W. Vanderbilt, now owned by Vanderbilt Mansion National Historic Site.
