= Brewster & Co. =

Defunct American motor vehicle body manufacturer

Coordinates: 40.7505°N 73.9389°W

Brewster & Company
- Industry: Coachbuilding
- Founded: 1810 in New Haven, Connecticut
- Founder: James Brewster
- Defunct: August 17, 1937
- Headquarters: New York, New York, United States

Brewster & Company was an American custom carriage and motorcar coachbuilder. James Brewster established the company in 1810 which operated for approximately 130 years. Brewster got its start in New Haven, Connecticut, and quickly gained a reputation for producing the best carriages in the country. In 1827, he set his shop at 52 Broad Street in New York City.

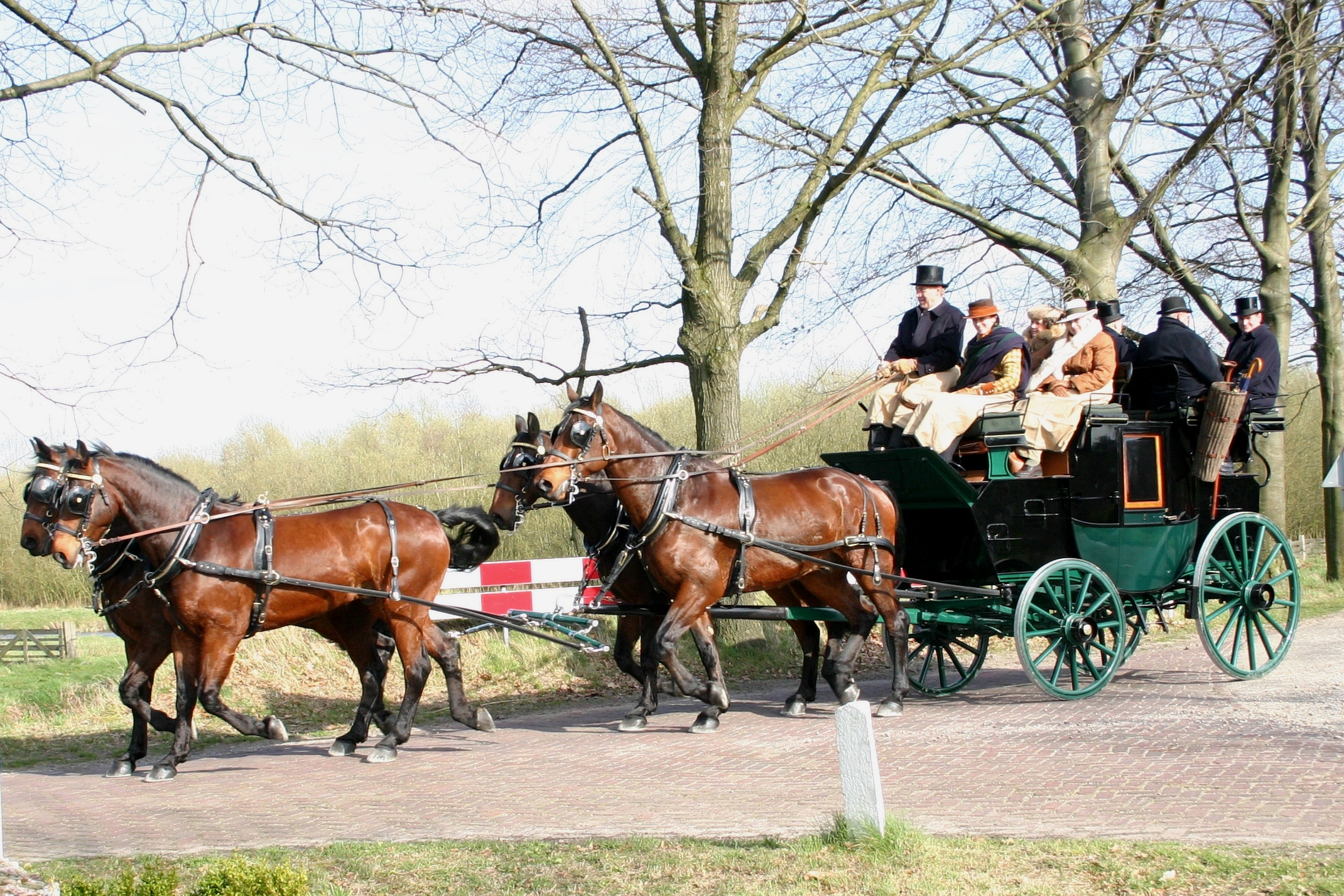
1887 Park Drag in The Netherlands

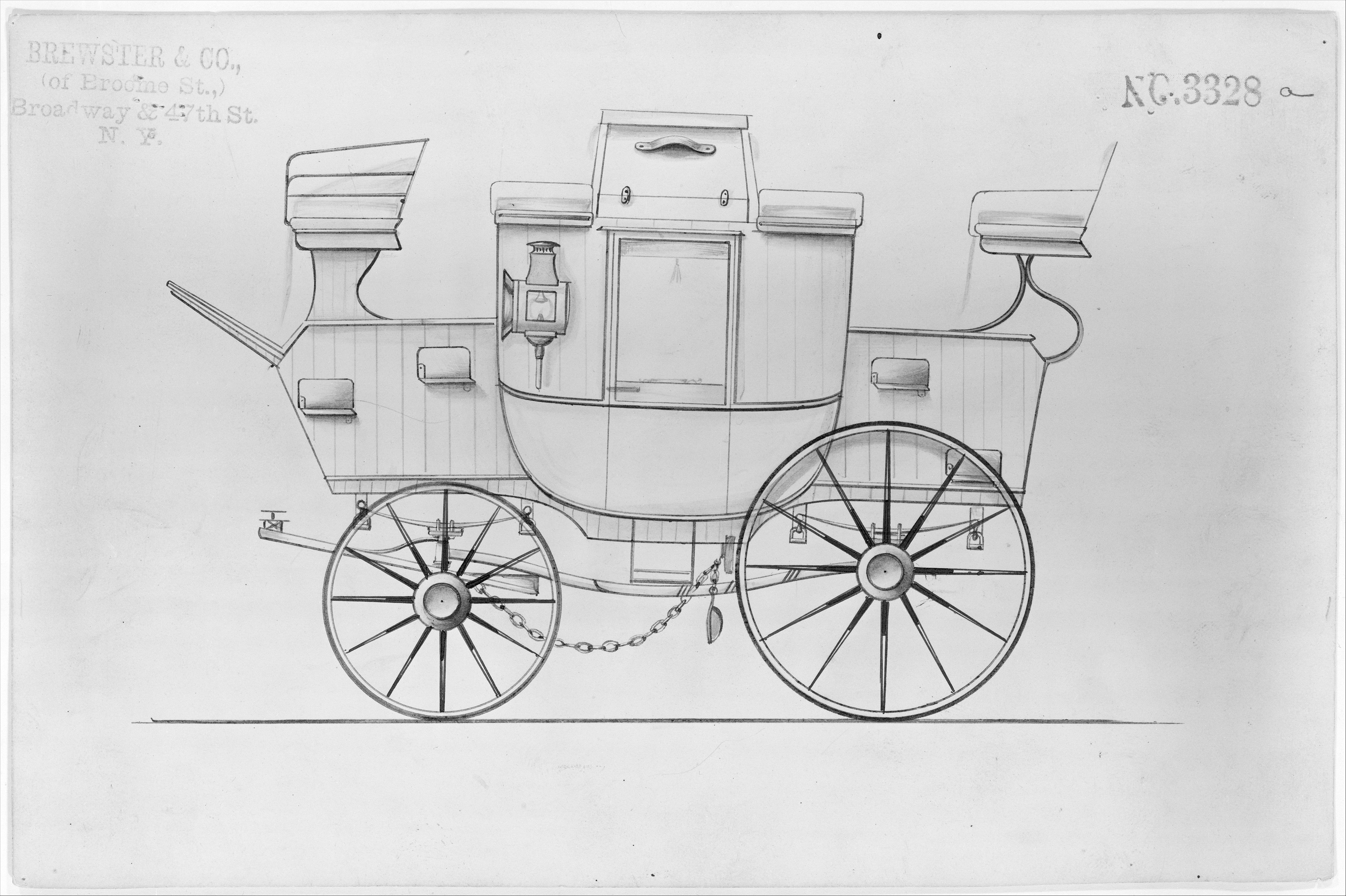
A Brewster design for a Park Drag

The earliest known automotive bodywork done by Brewster was on an electric vehicle in 1896, followed by a Delaunay-Belleville chassis with a gasoline engine in 1905. They eventually constructed bodywork on a variety of chassis, winning a special partnership with Rolls-Royce America Inc. in Springfield, Massachusetts

Brewster built a series of elegant and pricey cars at their Long Island City facility between 1915 and 1925. In 1929, the Great Depression started, and sales of high-end vehicles decreased. In 1934–35, they built and sold luxury bodies on 135 Ford V8 chassis, but bankruptcy proceedings began in mid-1935 and the last of Brewster's assets were sold by auction in 1937.

== Carriage building ==
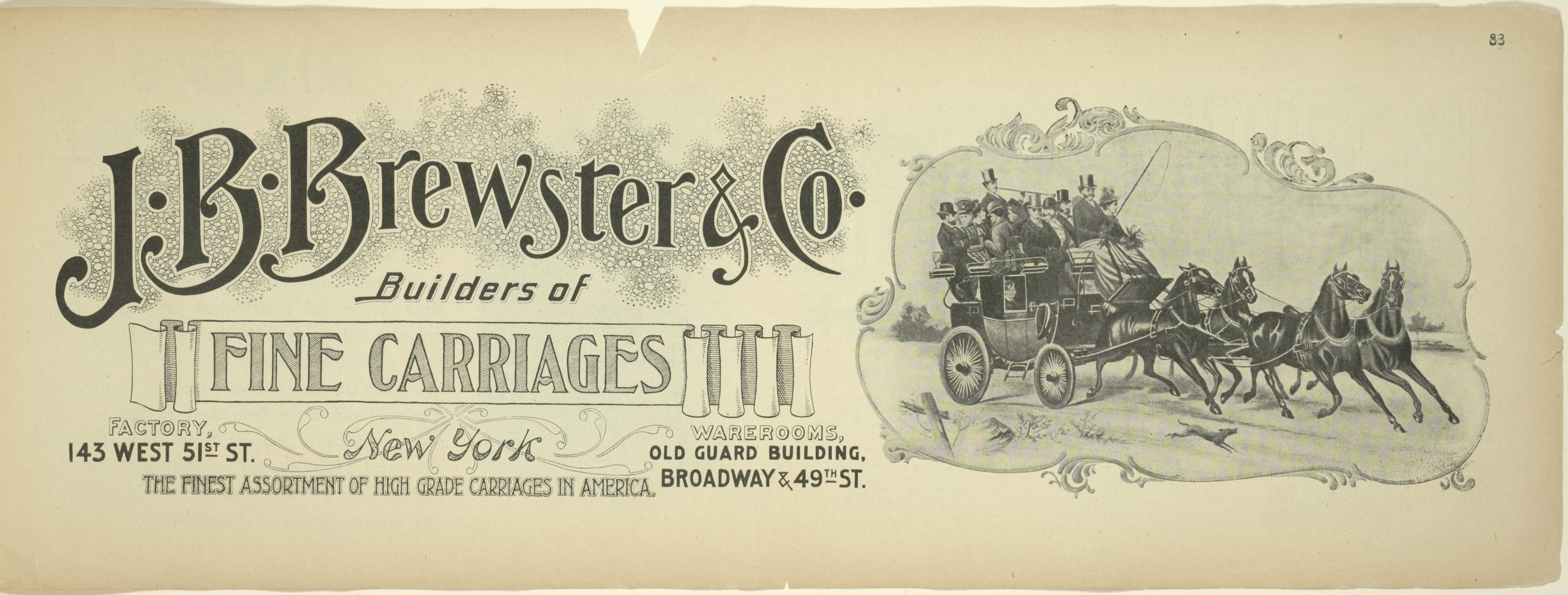
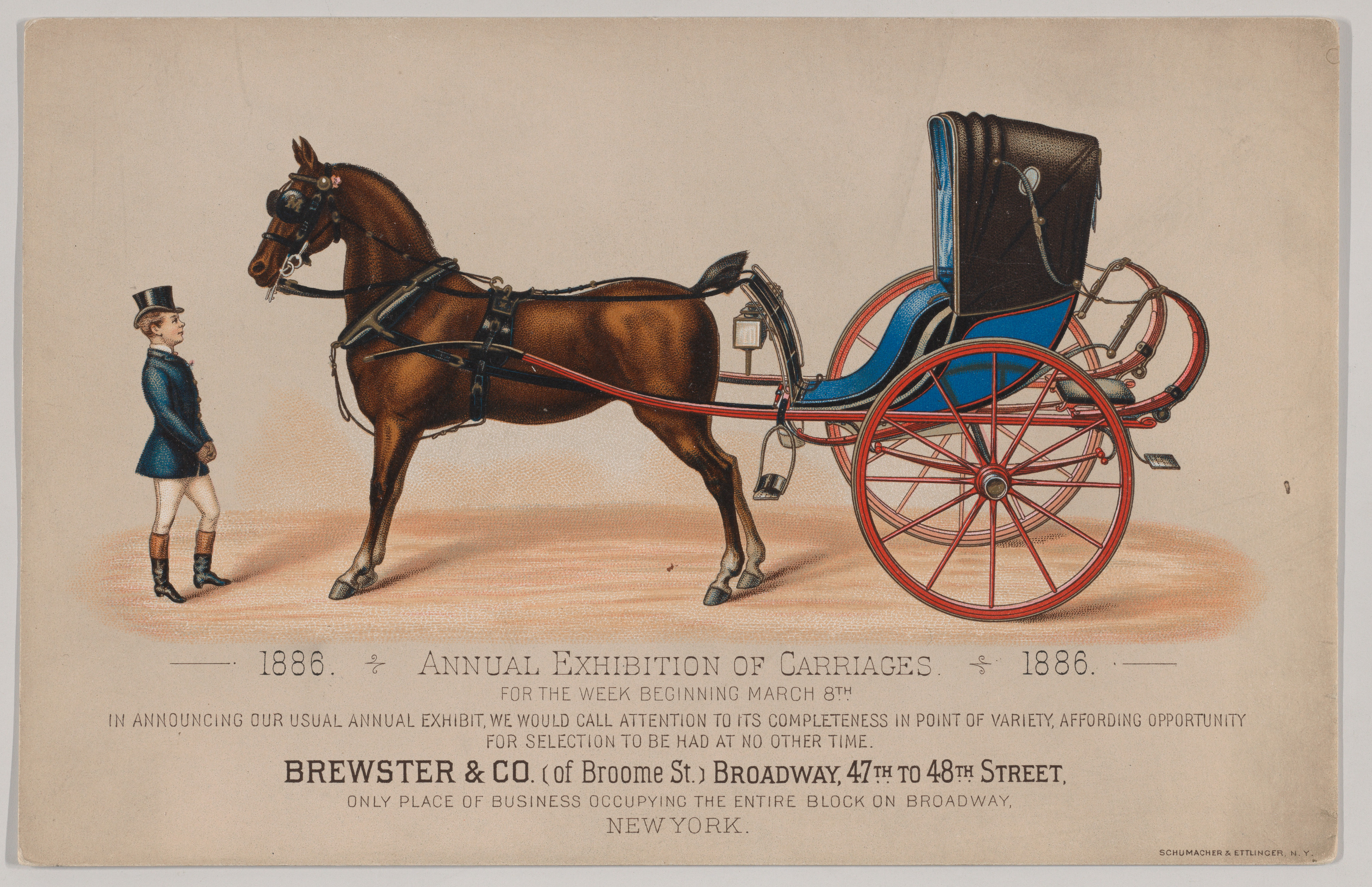
Brewster & Co advertisements from the 1800s

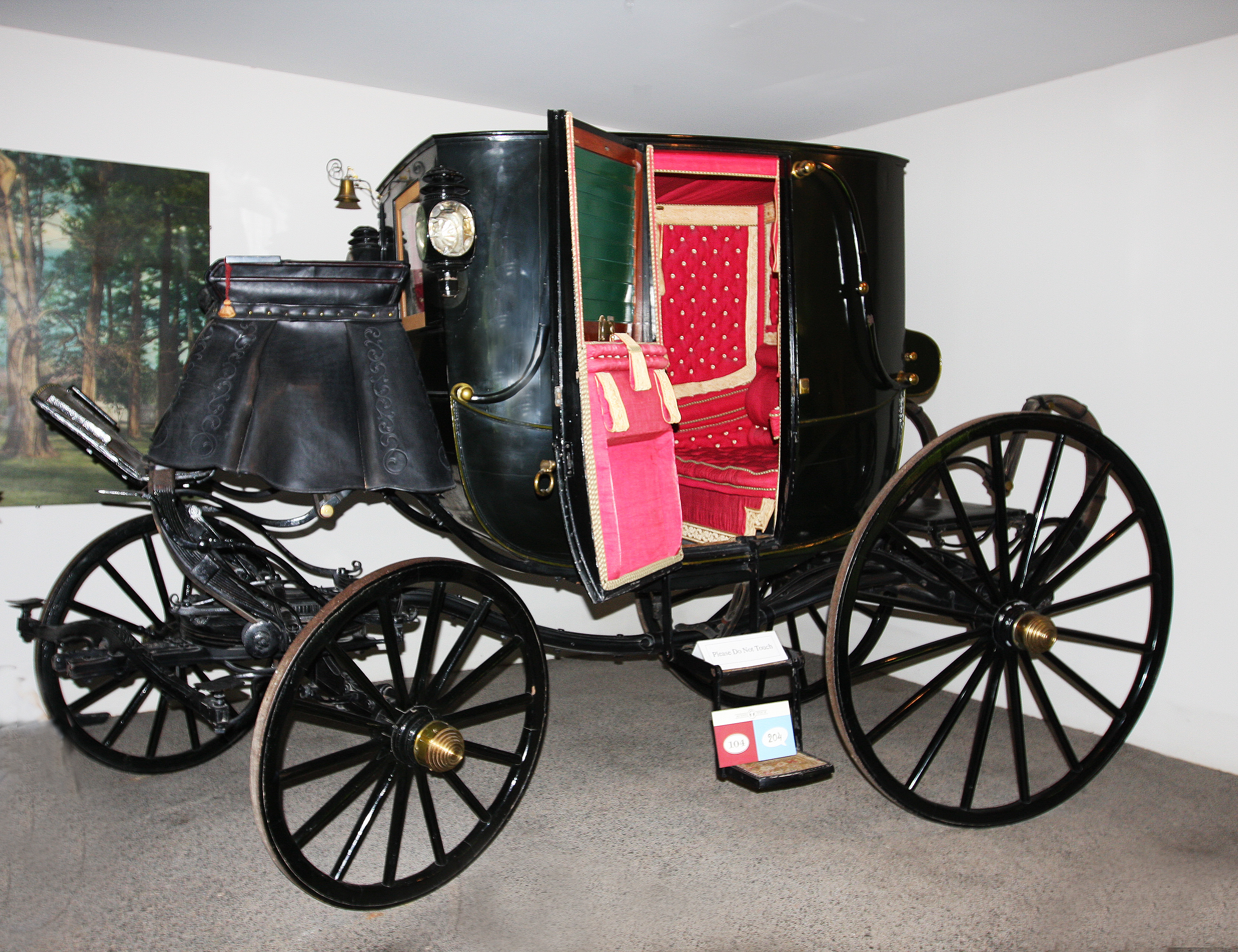
1831 Brewster-made Landau

James Brewster (b.1788–d. 1866) of Connecticut apprenticed as a mechanic with carriage builder Colonel Charles Chapman from 1804–1809. He then worked as a journeyman for John Cook and married Cook's niece. Around the War of 1812, lightweight four-wheeled vehicles were introduced and Brewster made hundreds of 'Brewster Wagons'. In 1821 he purchased his employer's New Haven business, and his reputation as a carriage builder spread to the larger cities of eastern coastal US with exports to Cuba and South America.

In 1827, Brewster opened shop in New York City and purchased a local factory, travelling back and forth between New York and New Haven. Unable to keep up with the demand for his carriages, Brewster started purchasing vehicles from J. Cook & Sons as well as opened a new factory, which burned down in 1836. After the Panic of 1837 financial crisis, James Brewster sold his Connecticut and New York businesses to his business partners.

In 1838, he returned to the carriage business, and over the next few decades the Brewster name was involved in numerous carriage building companies with his sons James Benjamin and Henry, grandsons, and various partners in both New Haven and New York. His grandson William Brewster adopted the slogan, "Carriage Builder for the American Gentleman". Some of the many Brewster company names of the coachbuilding era include James Brewster & Son/Sons/Co., James B. Brewster & Co., J.B. Brewster & Co., Brewster & Collis, Brewster & Lawrence, and Brewster & Baldwin.

The Brewsters won many awards for their coachbuilding including the gold medal for best exhibit at the 1878 International Exposition in Paris and the Chevalier of the Legion of Honor presented by the president of France. More honors were received at the 1893 Columbian Exposition in Chicago.

Ignoring the emergent automobile industry, the firm's carriage trade failed in the early 1900s—their lawyers stating "the failure of the firm was due to the firm's inability to collect accounts, inability to dispose of high-grade carriages and vehicles in the current market without great sacrifice, and a gradual falling off of business due to the competition of the automobile industry."

Brewster & Company made a staggering variety of vehicles ranging from tiny children’s pony carts to massive road coaches built to hold up to 20 adults. Their vehicles were used in practically every state of the Union and many were shipped to the Caribbean and South America. A number of their gorgeous creations are still in existence. The New-York Historical Society owns a massive Brewster Pioneer road coach that was used on the 5th Ave to Tarrytown run in the late 1800s. Brewster carriages can also be seen in the Melville Carriage House at the Museums at Stony Brook in Long Island, New York, the Shelburne Museum, in Shelburne, Vermont and at the Henry Ford Museum in Dearborn, Michigan.

— Mark Theobald

== Automobile bodies ==
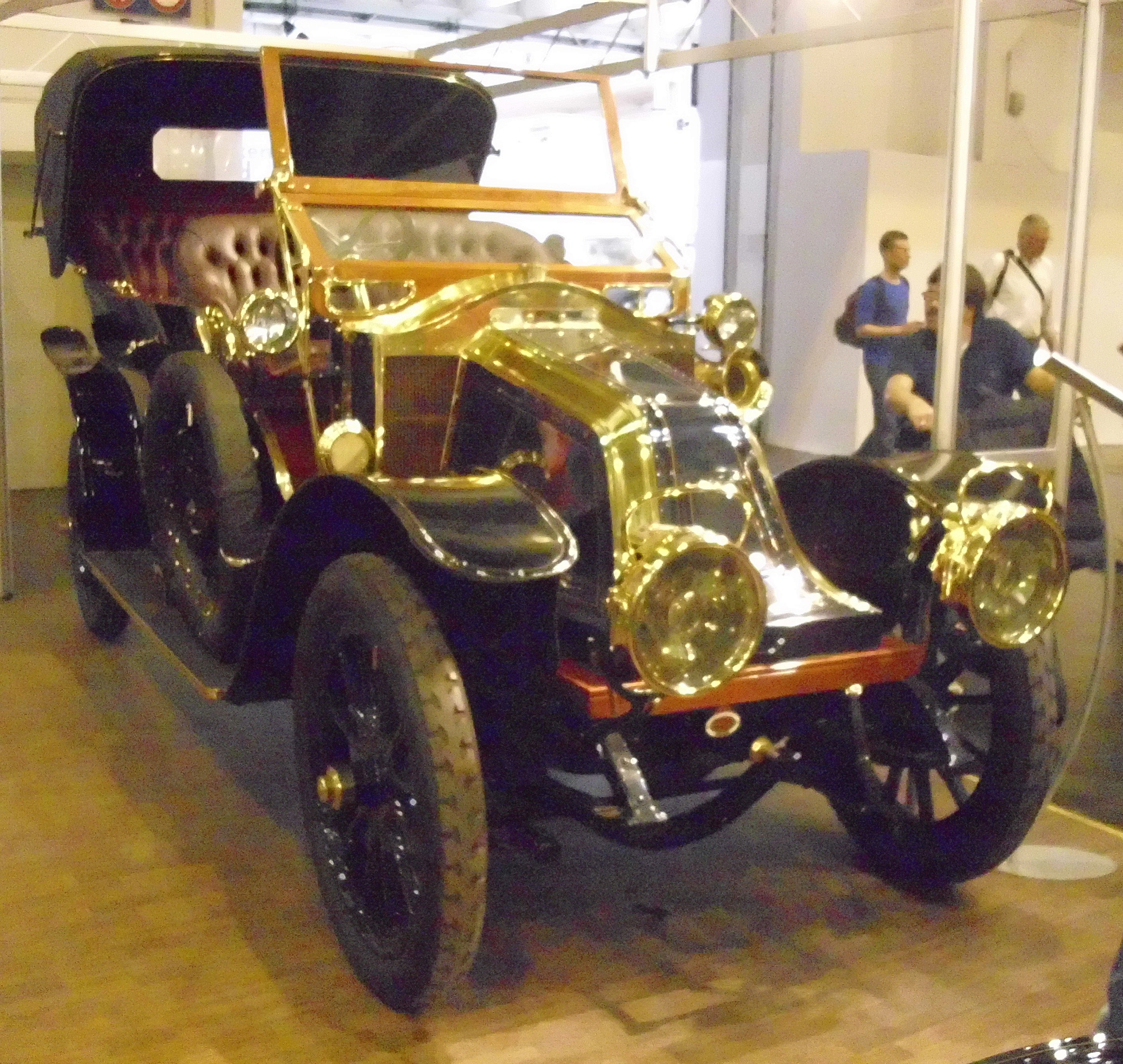
1909 double-phaeton on a Renault Type V-1 chassis

In 1905, Brewster became importers for Delaunay-Belleville, one of many desirable French brands of the time. This was their first venture into automobile body building, beginning their history of providing coachwork for prestigious autos. In 1914, most Brewster coachwork sales were on Delaunay-Bellevilles and other French makes. In 1914 Brewster was carefully selected to be sales agents for Rolls-Royce Limited and they became the main body suppliers for Rolls-Royce in the US.

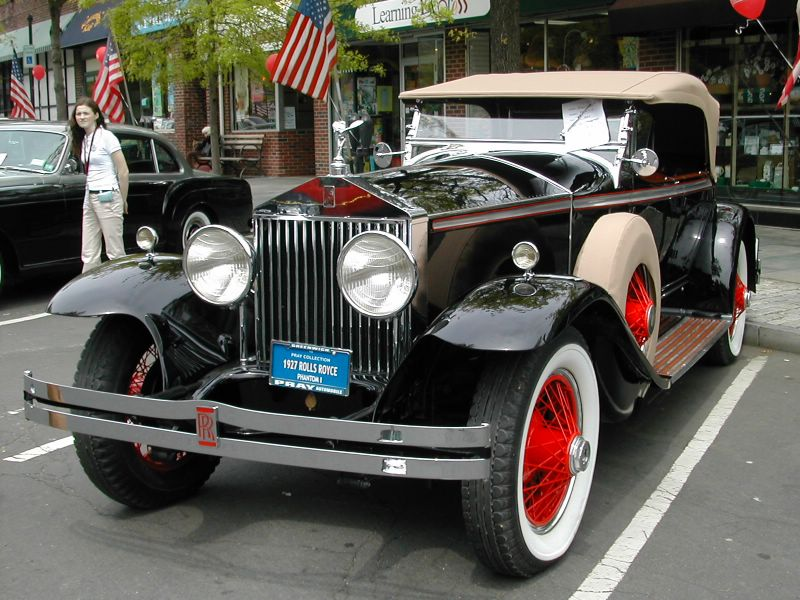
1927 Ascot Sport Phaeton on a Springfield Rolls-Royce Phantom I chassis

By 1925, Brewster's car had few sales, trading with Europe had resumed, and Rolls-Royce America Inc was expanding and gaining bargaining power against Brewster. Executives from Rolls-Royce of America and Brewster met and decided on the purchase of Brewster & Co. and their debt. Brewster had chassis fitted with temporary seats and protection and driven from Rolls-Royce's Massachusetts plant to the Brewster Building in Long Island City, New York for bodies. The Rolls-Royce showrooms offered 28 standardized body styles so as to deliver cars to customers quicker and for a lower price. Customers could purchase models directly from the showroom as well. Brewster gave English city names to the coachwork choices manufactured in America, to include the Derby Touring Sedan, the York Roadster, the Huntington Limousine, the Avon Sedan, Newmarket Convertible Sedan, and the French city of Trouville Town Car.

After Rolls-Royce America Inc. folded, from 1931 to 1934 Rolls-Royce Phantom II chassis were shipped directly from Britain to Brewster's large facility in Long Island City.

== Brewster bodied automobiles ==
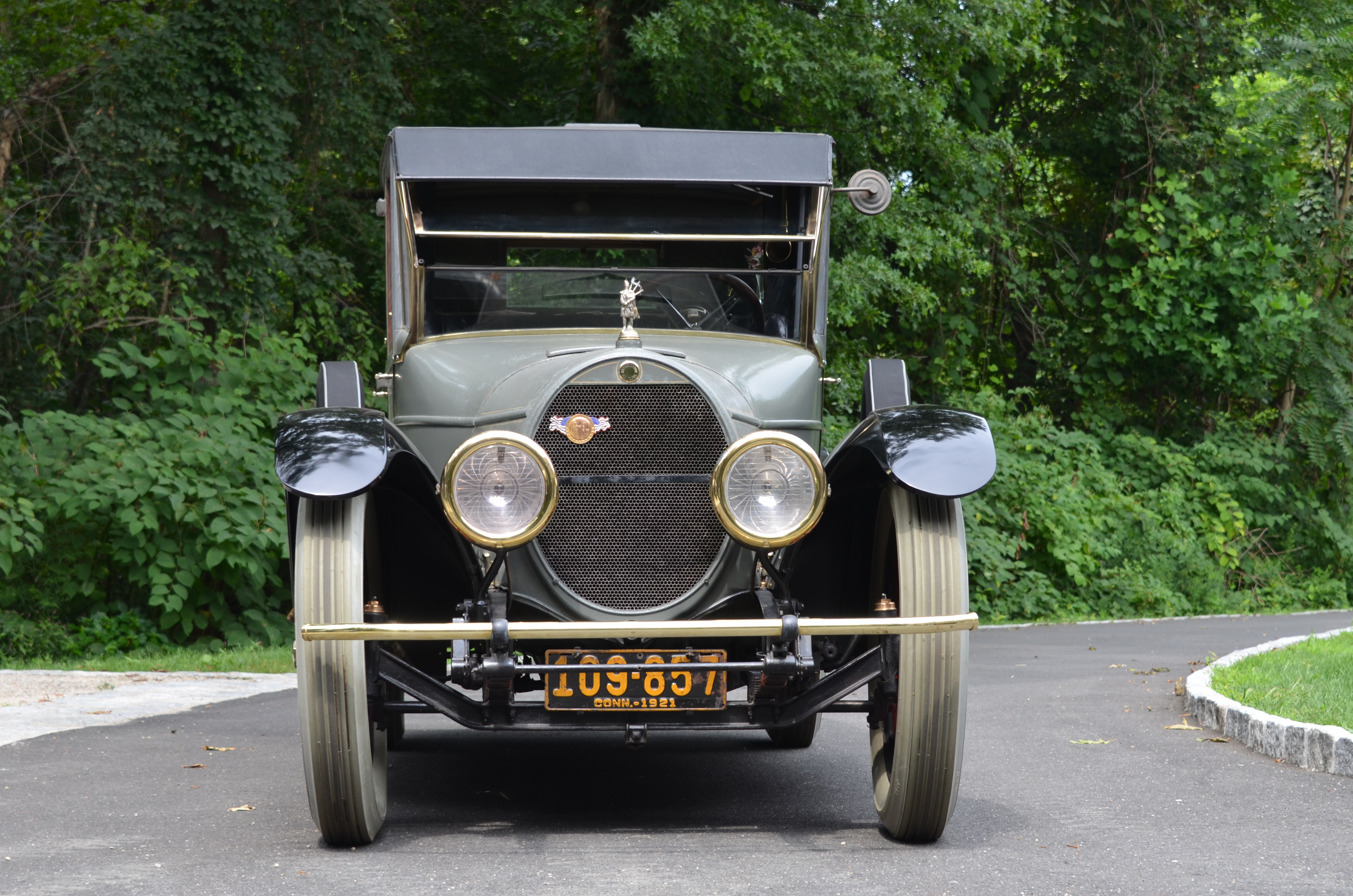
Brewster produced a unique two-piece folding windshield

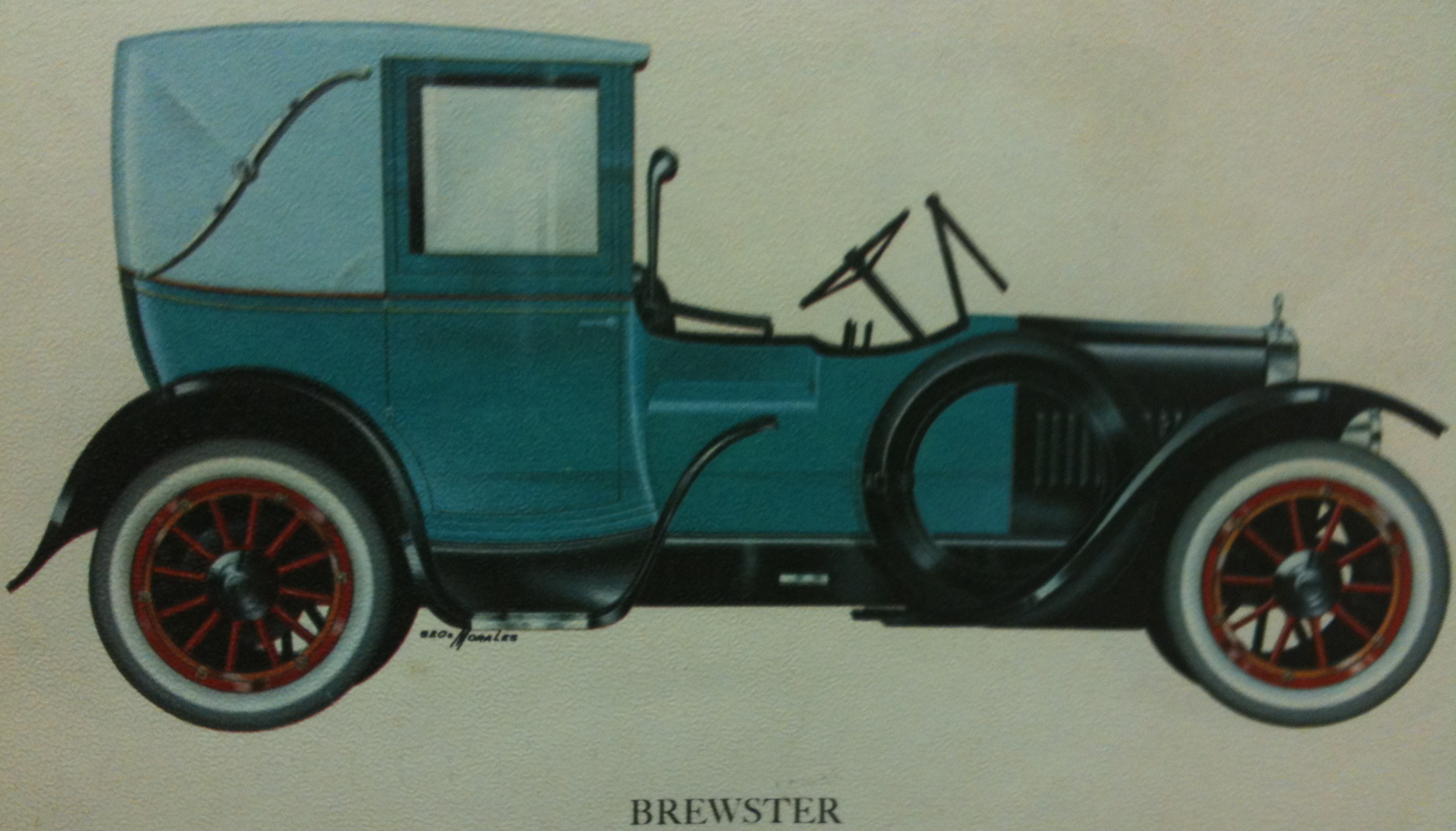
1920 Brewster Town Car

Most bodywork were ordered to fit the imported chassis of the customers. Supplies were in danger once Europe entered the war in the summer of 1914. Following the 1915 shipwreck of the British liner Lusitania, Brewster started producing its own automobiles, a practice it kept up until 1925. They cost as much as "a Packard Twin Six limousine plus a fleet of five Model T Ford roadsters," while being smaller than their typical chassis for traversing Manhattan's streets. Brewster's personal cars had oval radiators and gleaming patent leather fenders, making them easy to identify. They were frequently equipped with Brewster's distinctive two-piece folding windscreen and were propelled by four-cylinder Knight engines with sleeve valves.

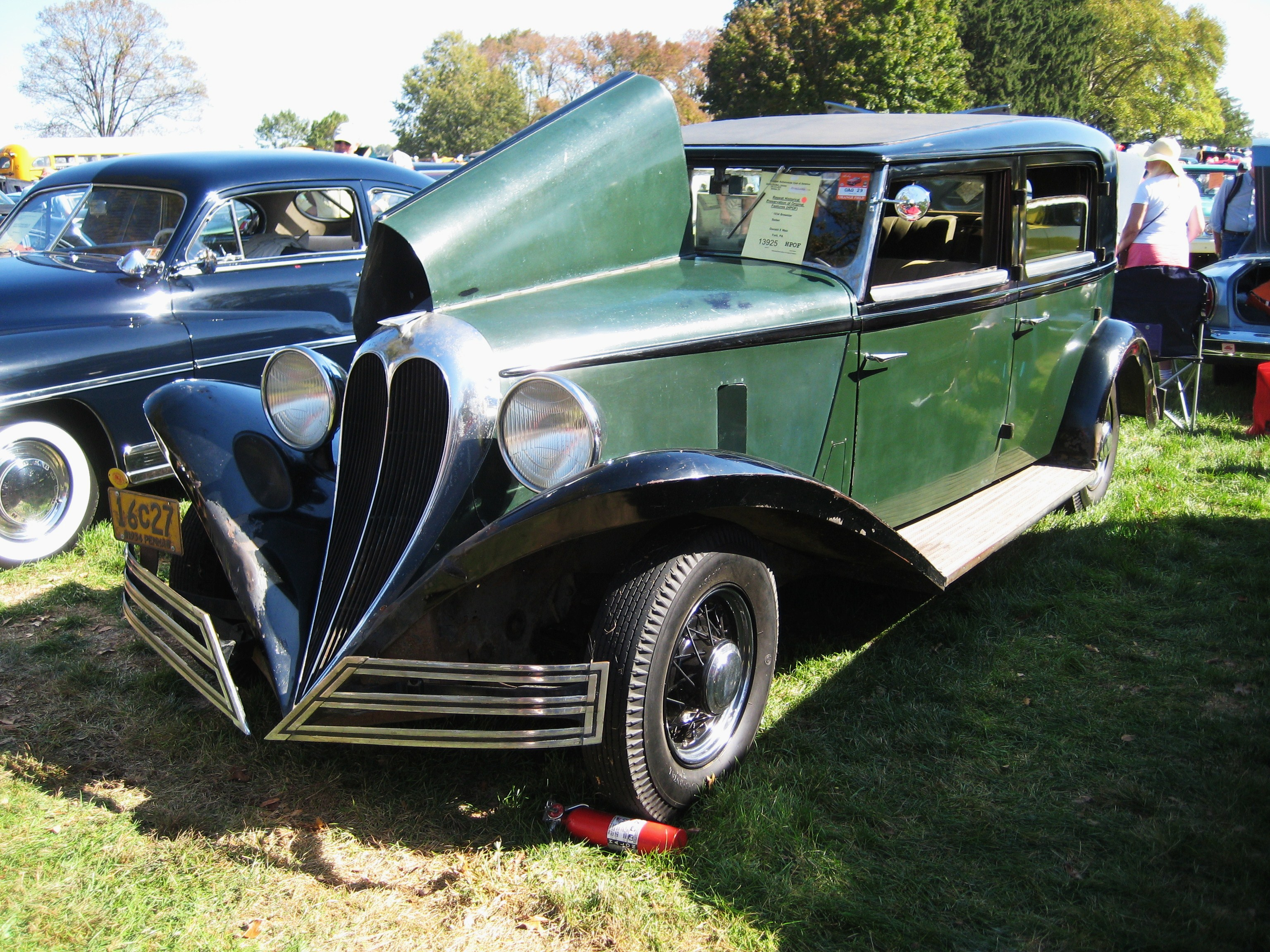
1934 Brewster V8

When the Great Depression first began, there was strong sentiment against the wealthy and their archetypal Brewster-bodied Rolls-Royces and Brewster's bodies were not selling well. In 1934 sales chief J.S. Inskip, who had taken control of operations in the hope of saving Brewster, bought 135 Ford V8 roadster chassis for model year 1934 and designed a body for them easily identified by its swoopy fenders and a heart-shaped grille. Stylish and sold for US$3,500 ($84,235 in 2025 dollars), it was a hit at the 1934 New York Auto Show. The bodies were worth more than the chassis. These cars were branded Brewster and sold at Rolls-Royce showrooms. Inskip marketed the cars to New York celebrities (see § Notable owners), with whom it became popular. Rolls-Royce Limited under English management strongly objected to coachwork being installed on Ford chassis, which led to Rolls-Royce of America, Inc. changing their name to Springfield Manufacturing Corporation and renegotiating its contract with the British firm to continue importing British-made products into America. The Lincoln K series chassis installed with a V12 for 1934 did list the Brewster Non Collapsible Cabriolet with a 145" wheelbase but the coachwork choice did not continue for 1935.

Ford Brewster's initiative was originally profitable, but soon Brewster started to lose money, and the company's bondholders and directors asked that it be shut down. Dallas E. Winslow bought the company that was the subject of bankruptcy proceedings in July 1935.

== Liquidation ==
The last of Brewster's possessions were auctioned off in public on August 18, 1937. Under the leadership of previous sales director John Inskip, the Rolls-Royce dealership and body shop operated on the same location as before. During World War II, the Brewster Aeronautical Corporation remained in business.

== Fame ==
In 1956, Colonel Paul Downing penned the following for American Heritage Magazine: "It is unlikely, though, that America truly cemented its position in the world of genuinely stylish carriages prior to the company of Brewster & Company of Broome Street taking the initiative. The adage that a new design lacked value unless Brewster proved it became common knowledge in the industry."

Queens' Brewster & Co. building

- Brewster maintained track of each customer's family crest and color. The Vanderbilts' was a shade of maroon, the Astors' was a shade of blue, J. P. Morgan's was a shade of dark green. New clients occasionally found it challenging to select a body color because of these exclusive choices.
- Brewster created a top-secret oil-based finish that required far less upkeep than the varnishes of the day. Other businesses attempted to copy it but failed.
- After conducting extensive investigation, Brewster created a windscreen with a four-pane design in response to drivers' complaints about blinding street lights at night. Because it wasn't patented, the "Brewster windshield" was widely imitated by body shops and production cars.
- Brewster also produces the hulls for speedboats.
- Children's pony carts and buses that can accommodate 20 or more passengers were also manufactured by Brewster.

Alumni

- Brewster was the birthplace of many engineers and designers in the automotive industry. James Way initially worked at Brewster before becoming the designer and engineer of Pierce-cast-aluminum Arrow's bodies from 1904 to 1920. Edsel Ford, a Brewster native, convinced Henry Crecelius Sr., the head of Lincoln's coachbuilding section, to join the company. Brewster hired Raymond Dietrich as a draftsman before being fired for secret designing for other makes. Harry Lonschein founded Rollston after starting out at Brewster.

Notable owners

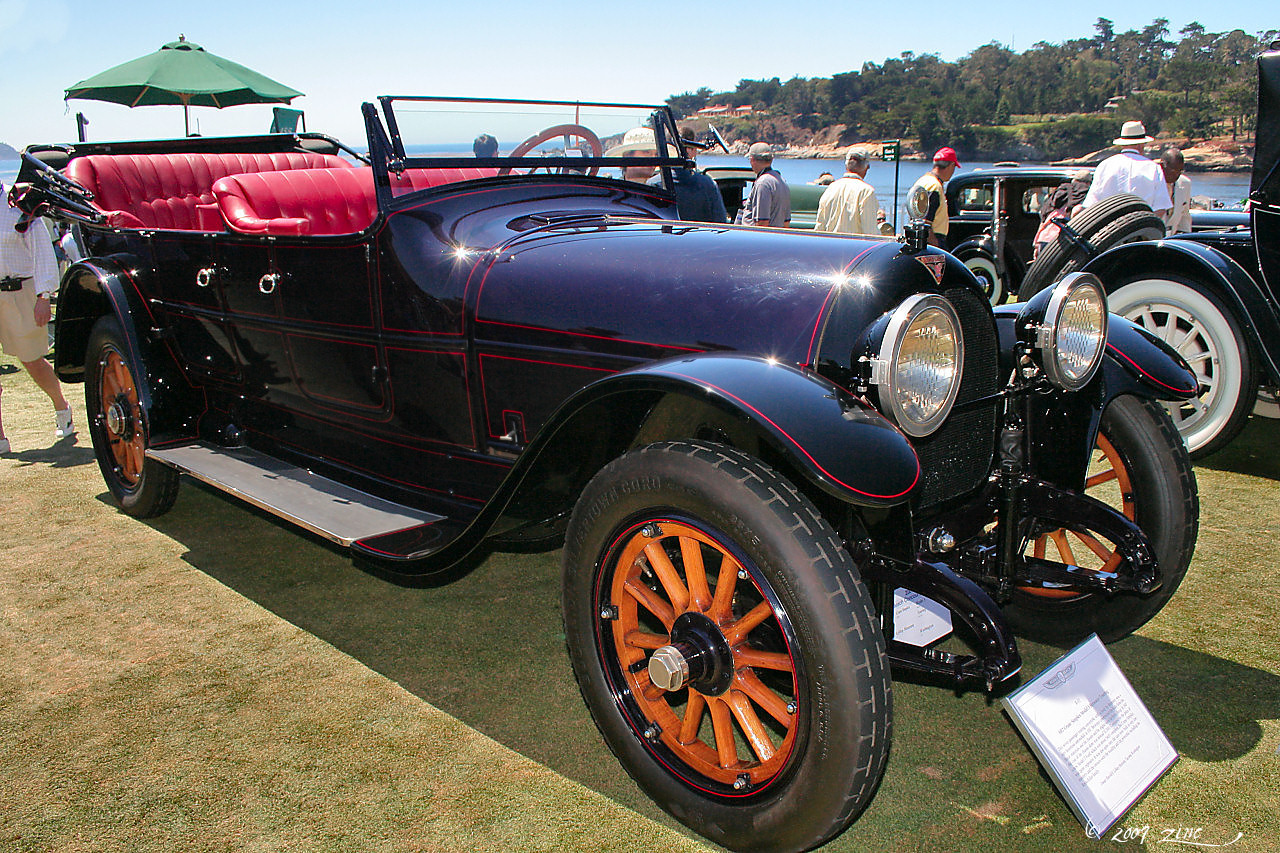
1917 Simplex Crane Model 5 Brewster-bodied Touring Car

- Louis Comfort Tiffany - Brewster's second gasoline auto chassis, a Panhard et Levassor
- John D. Rockefeller Sr. - His Crane-Simplex had two Brewster bodies, for summer and winter.
- John D. Rockefeller Jr.
- Frank Winfield Woolworth
- Vincent Astor

Brewster V8 owners

- Edsel Ford - Purchased the first Brewster-bodied Ford V8 available
- Al Jolson
- Cole Porter
- Lily Pons
- Gertrude Lawrence
- Fred Waring
- Victor Moore

=== Edsel Ford ===
The 1935 Ford grill was used to create 15 of the vehicles using a Ford V8 chassis. The first delivered example was purchased by Edsel Ford. A 1934 Brewster Town Cabriolet DeVille (chassis number 18-802233; engine number 49493; Brewster build number 9002), a "one off" custom with a lengthened 127-inch wheelbase, was the third Ford Brewster and the only one without the standard Brewster front end. Edsel requested a 1934 Ford grill, therefore that is what was installed. It is also the sole model produced with a banjo steering wheel, normal Ford dash rather than the Brewster dash, and 16-inch wheels rather than the standard 17-inch wheels. It was stored by Edsel Ford at a Ford dealer in New York so that he and his family may use it while in New York. In 1939, he had it retrofitted with a 239 Mercury flathead V8 engine that produced nearly 100 horsepower. It is one of Edsel Ford's few personal cars and still survives today in remarkable condition, unrestored. It was presented by RM Auctions at Automobiles of Amelia in 2008 where it sold for $198,000.

The Brewster-bodied Ford chassis Town Car with heart-shaped grill is the only classic Ford designated by the Classic Car Club of America.
