= Henry M. Crane =

American automotive engineer (1874–1856)

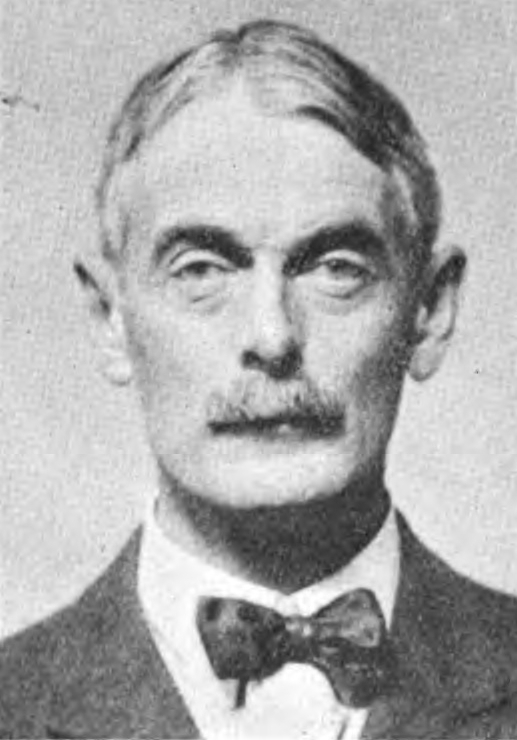
- Henry M. Crane, 1924
- Born: Henry Middlebrook Crane; June 16, 1874; New York City, New York, U.S.
- Died: January 21, 1956 (aged 81); New York City, New York, U.S.
- Education: Massachusetts Institute of Technology
- Occupations: Mechanical Engineer; Aeronautical Engineer; Electrical Engineer; Marine Engineer; Automobile executive
- Employer(s): American Bell Telephone. Western Electric; Crane & Whitman; Crane Motor Car Company; Simplex Automobile Company; Crane-Simplex; Wright-Martin Aircraft Corporation; Wright Aeronautical Corporation; General Motors
- Known for: Pontiac Six engine Crane-Simplex cars Dixie speedboat engines

Henry Middlebrook Crane (June 16, 1874 – January 21, 1956) was an American engineer and pioneer in the automobile industry. He was the president of Crane Motor Car Company, vice president of engineering for the Simplex Automobile Company, and designed the Pontiac Six motor for General Motors.

Crane also designed speedboat motors for three American Power Boat Association Gold Cup champions and three Harmsworth Cup winners. During World War I, he designed and oversaw the production of airplane engines for Wright-Martin, which were used by both French and United States warplanes. He also chaired the Liberty Engine Test Committee and helped create Loening Aeronautical Engineering Corporation, which developed and manufactured fighter planes.

In its 1924 silver anniversary issue, the Automobile Trade Journal selected Crane as one of the "Creative Workers" who played a significant role in the development and advancement of the automobile.

== Early life ==
Crane was born in New York City on June 16, 1874, to Elizabeth and Jonathan Crane. His father was an officer of The Fidelity and Casualty Company of New York and a commissioner of Jamaica, Queens. By 1892, his father was with the American Casualty Insurance and Security Company and came up with the idea of salary insurance.

Crane attended private schools before going to Phillips Exeter Academy. He attended the Massachusetts Institute of Technology, graduating with a Bachelor of Science (B.S.) in mechanical engineering in 1895 and a B.S. in electrical engineering in 1896. While there, he joined the Fraternity of Delta Psi, was secretary and treasurer of the Exeter Club, and was the scribe of The Technology Zoo.

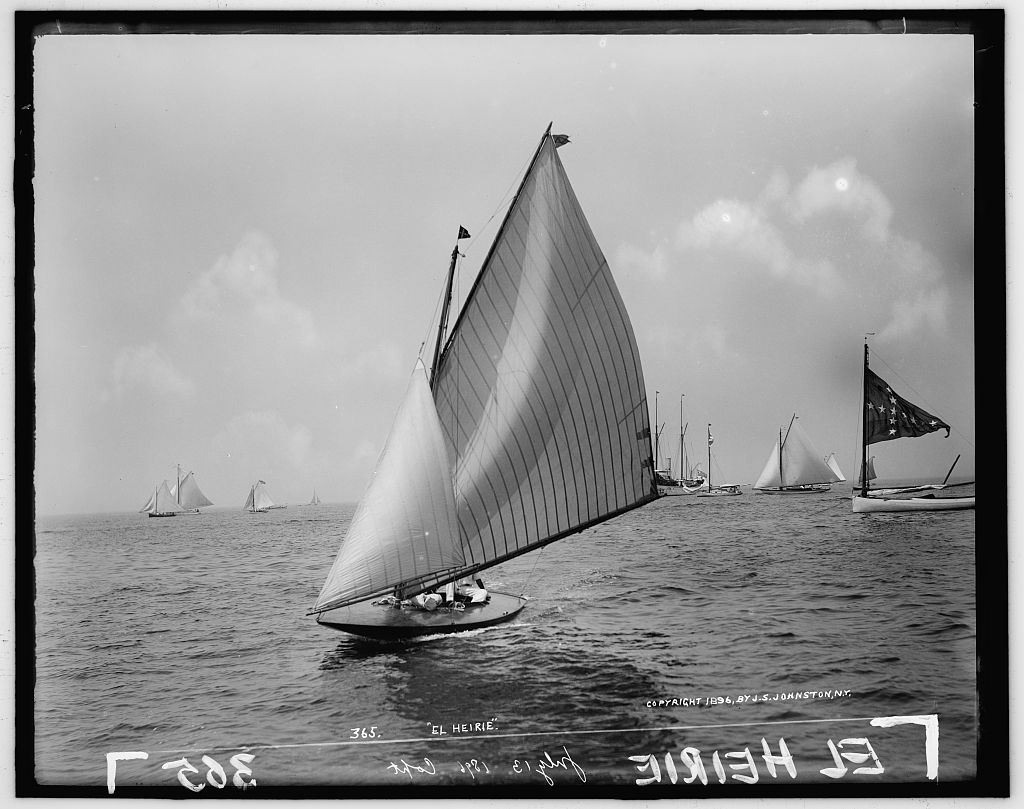
El Heirie, July 13, 1896

As a hobby, Crane started building racing boats with his brother, Clinton H. Crane. Crane designed the engines, and Clinton worked on the hulls. In July 1896, the brothers sailed their El Heirie for the Seawanhaka Challenge Cup at Oyster Bay, New York, with Clinton serving as captain, losing to the Canadian yacht Glencairn. In 1898, they sailed another of their designs, the 31 feet (9.4 m) yacht Seawanhaka, in the trials for the Sewanhaka-Corinthian International Challenge.

== Career ==
=== Early career ===
In September 1896, Crane became an engineer for the American Bell Telephone Company and worked at their experimental lab in Boston, Massachusetts. He patented an earth conductor or ground wire attachment in June 1897 and a common battery multiple switchboard in September 1897. In June 1899, Crane and T.C. Wales Jr. received a patent for a telephone toll circuit.

Crane began working for the New York branch of Western Electric Company in November 1898, remaining there through May 1906. While with Western Electric, he worked on experimental and engineering projects with telephones and switchboards. In 1906, he developed a gasoline launch engine.

=== Crane & Whitman ===
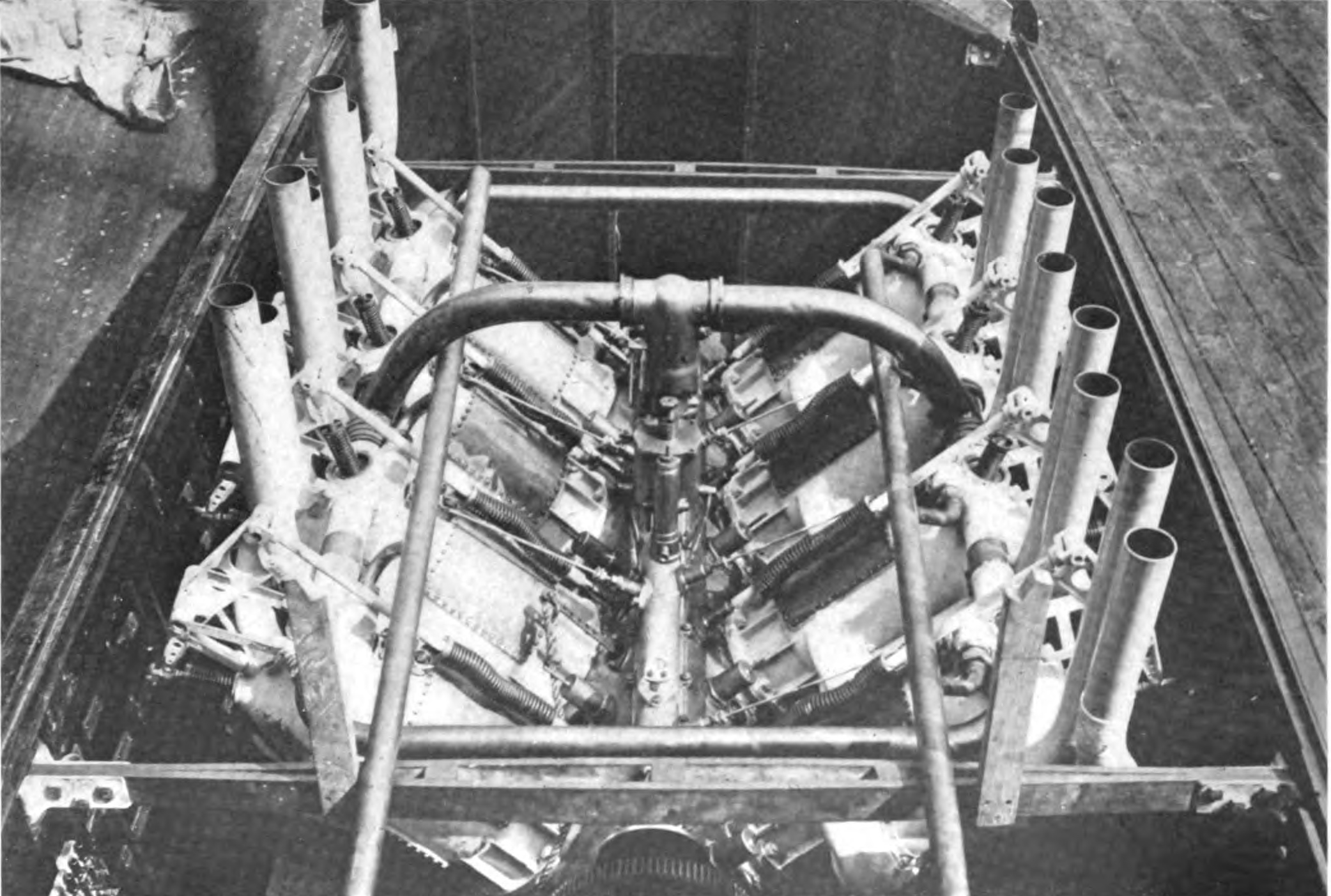
Crane & Whitman engine in Dixie II, 1908

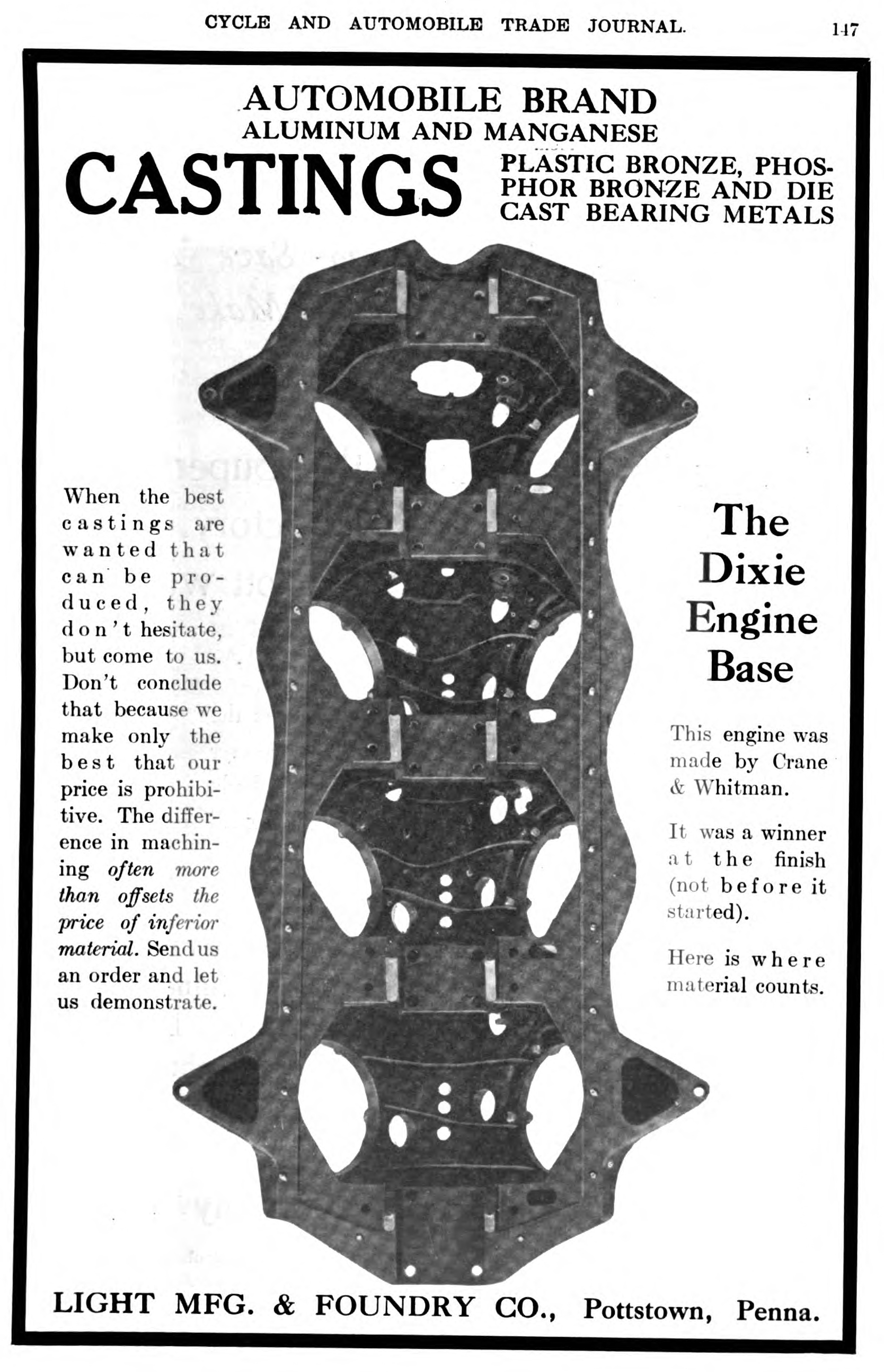
1911 ad featuring the Crane & Whitman Dixie speedboat engine

On October 12, 1906, Crane cofounded the Crane & Whitman Company with Allen E. Whitman. The company started with $50,000 (equivalent to $1,791,667 in 2023) in capital stock and $14,900 (equivalent to $533,917 in 2023) of cash to "deal in motor engines". Crane served as company president; Whitman was the company's agent, vice-president and treasurer; P. M. Erickson was its secretary; and R. W. Wasson was its superintendent.

Crane worked on automobile design and construction in the Crane & Whitman factory on 94 West 7th Street in Bayonne, New Jersey; the factory built automobiles with four-cylinder engines. Crane & Whitman also made engines and did custom machine work to order. They were known for using the best available materials for each part of their engines and vehicles, including high-quality bronzes, and Krupp and nickel steel. Between 1906 and 1907, Crane & Whitman built four-cylinder chassis which they road tested in Europe and the United States. Crane's first vehicle had a T-head engine that utilized a driveshaft with a radius rod to control wheel motion.

In 1907, Clinton Crane, then a naval architect, asked his brother's company to create a 200-horsepower engine that weighed less than 2,000 pounds (910 kg) for use in speedboats. Crane designed an eight-cylinder, 200-horsepower engine, the largest marine engine at the time. In water, the engine weighed 2,205 pounds (1,000 kg) with oil service, pipes, and reserve gear. Crane reduced the engine's weight by arranging the cylinders in a ninety-degree "V", making the crankcase approximately half the weight of its straight-eight counterparts, and made many parts from steel rather than bronze, as was typical for marine engines at the time. The base of the engine was a complicated shape, made in a single casting. The individually cast iron cylinders were arranged in two groups of four. The engine's exhaust ports removed seventy to eighty percent of the exhaust gases, preventing the main valves from pitting and burning out.

Before putting this new marine engine on its boat, Crane tested the motor and clutch at his shop for three weeks, using a pulley and brake in place of a propeller. This allowed him to simulate the strain the driveshaft would experience from the propeller. Factory testing also allowed the brothers to tune Clinton's new motorboat, the Dixie II, for a race in a week. In 1908, the Dixie II set the motorboat speed record of 31.03 knots or 35.74 statute miles, with designer Clinton steering and Crane acting as engineer. The engine achieved 220 horsepower with its true screw propeller with elliptical blades.

The Dixie II would go on to win 105 races, including the Harmsworth Cup in 1908 and Gold Cup in 1908 and 1909. Motor Boat magazine noted, "Crane & Whitman seems to have brought forward a marine motor which is better than the best of the foreign manufacturers." Crane's Dixie engine brought his relatively unknown company renown in engine manufacturing.

By 1908, Crane & Whitman had forty employees and announced that they had developed a new car for the 1908 season. The same year, Crane designed a new six-cylinder automobile engine. However, the factory closed in September 1908.

=== Crane Motor Car Company ===
Crane & Whitman became the Crane Motor Car Company on June 4, 1909, with Erickson replacing Whitman as the corporate agent. The Crane brothers continued to collaborate on speedboat designs. Their Dixie III (a retrofitted Dixie II) won the Harmsworth Cup and the Gold Cup in 1910, and Dixie IV won the Harmsworth Cup in 1911. Dixie IV also set an American speed record.

In July 1911, Crane advertised for an expert tool maker for steady work and good wages. He released the Model 3 automobile in 1912. It had a six-cylinder, 563.7-cubic-inch engine, giving the car an estimated 110 horsepower. This was followed by the Crane Model 4. Crane's cars were sold as bare chassis as the factory produced no bodywork. In 1913, a Crane chassis cost nearly $9,000 (equivalent to $293,182 in 2023). Fewer than 65 Model 3s and 4s were completed.

=== Crane-Simplex ===
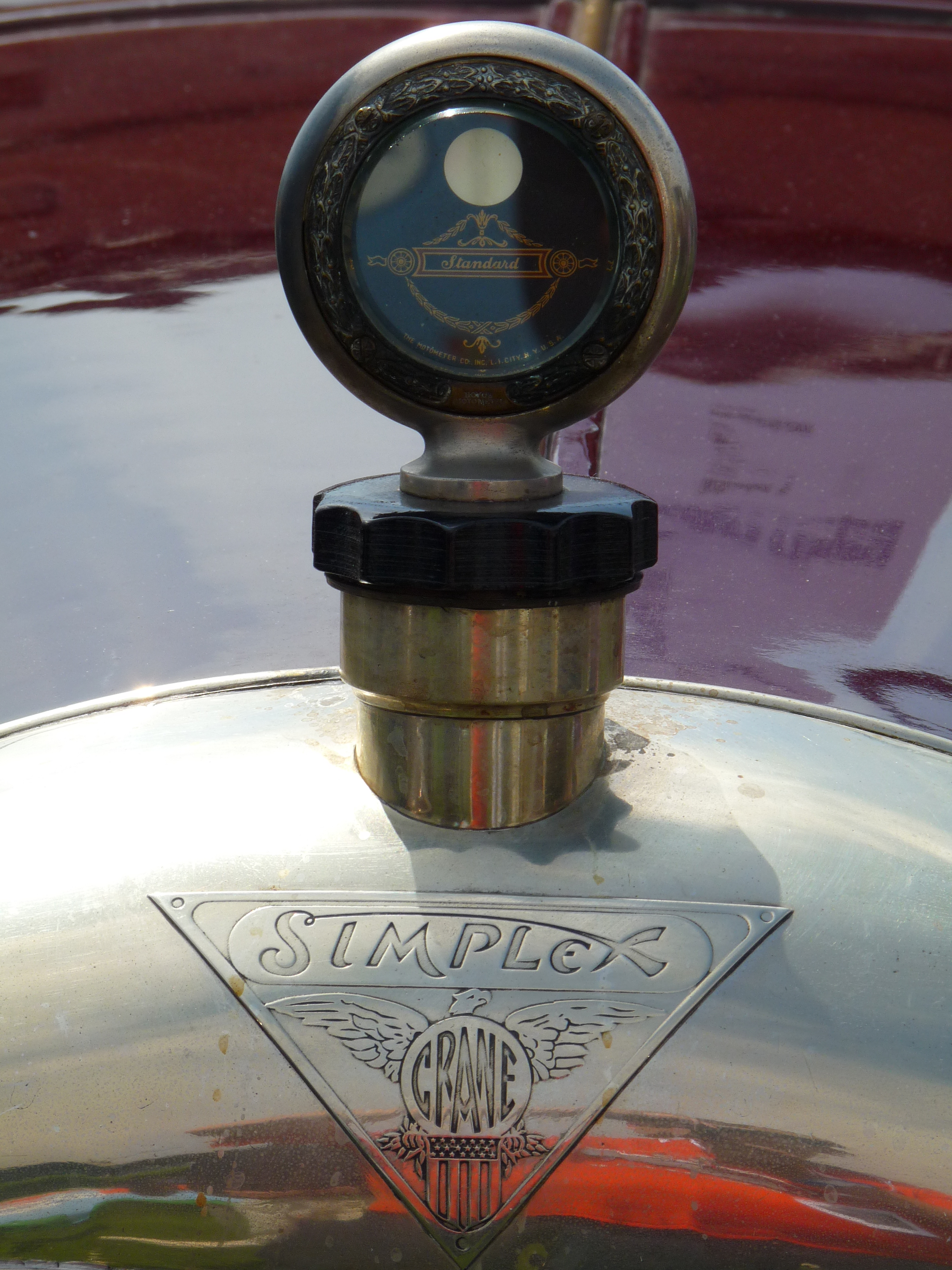
1916 Simplex-Crane Model 5 hood ornament

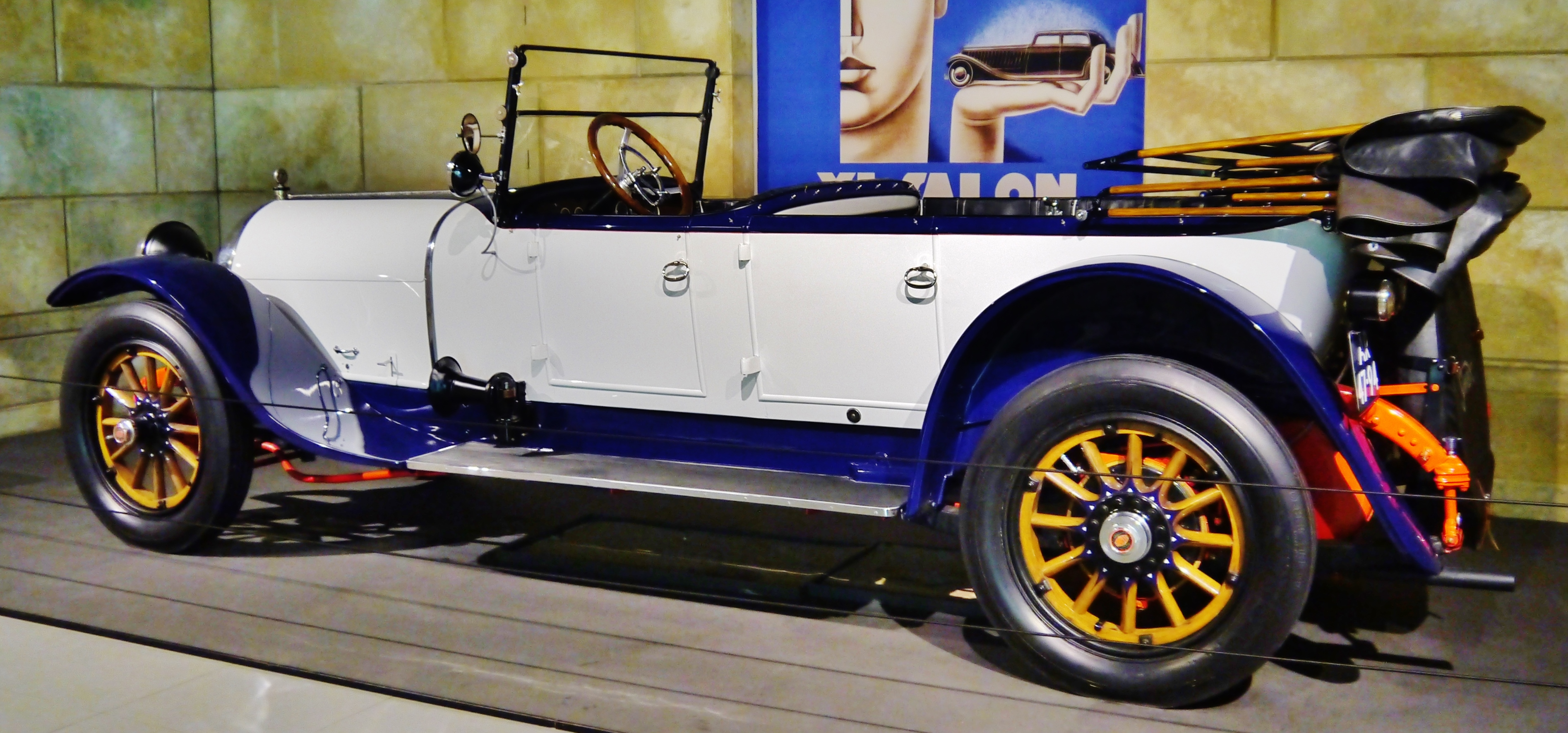
1916 Simplex-Crane Model 5

In late 1914, the Simplex Automobile Company of New Brunswick, New Jersey bought Crane Motor Car Company to acquire Crane's engineering advances. The Crane factory in Bayonne was sold to the Car Lighting & Power Company in August 1915. Crane became the vice president and consulting engineer for Simplex.

Crane developed a new car called the Crane Model 46 H.P. Six-Cylinder Simplex or the Simplex-Crane Model 5, which was similar to his Crane Model 4 but on a longer wheelbase. The Model 5 had a six-cylinder, 110-horsepower flathead engine that could reach up to 65 or 68 miles per hour (105 or 109 km/h).

Crane would not deliver an engine to his customers until it had gone through the equivalent of 1,000 miles (1,600 km) of road travel on a belt test that took 36 hours, as well as a block test of 48 hours. The Hartford Courant reported, "The six-cylinder power plant on which the Crane-Simplex Company has established its reputation for mechanical excellence, is the result of H. M. Crane's engineering genius."

Crane's customers included Alfred Atmore Pope, Theodate Pope Riddle, John D. Rockefeller, John D. Rockefeller Jr., Herbert L. Satterlee, and Frederick William Vanderbilt. In 1936, Satterlee invited Crane to drive his Simplex-Crane Model 5 as its speedometer turned to 300,000 miles (480,000 km).

=== Wright-Martin Aircraft Corporation ===
In October 1915, the Wright Company of Garwood, New Jersey agreed to purchase Crane-Simplex. When the merger was completed in 1916, the company was renamed Wright-Martin Aircraft Corporation, and Crane became its vice president and chief engineer. In November 1915, Crane went to France to pick an airplane engine that could be manufactured in the United States. He secured the North American rights to make Hispano-Suiza airplane engines. The Wall Street Journal described acquiring the rights to manufacture the Hispano-Suiza as "a particular achievement".

Car production at New Brunswick ceased in October 1917 for World War I and never resumed. The former automobile plant became the largest airplane motor factory in the world. There, Crane oversaw the production of the Hispano-Suiza engines. He engineered the 150-horsepower Hispano-Suiza and developed and engineered 200-horsepower and 300-horsepower Hispano-Suiza engines.

In August 1918, Crane developed a 200-horsepower geared motor and worked on a cannon motor. The French government placed an order for 1,800 Hispano-Suizas with Wright-Martin by August 1916, and orders for thousands of engines soon came from the United States government. The factory delivered 700 airplane engines in October 1918 alone.

=== World War I and Loeing Aeronautical ===
In January 1919, the Aircraft Board appointed Crane to chair the three-person Liberty Engine Test Committee with the goal "of making the Liberty airplane engine meet the highest possible standards." Crane also served on the Liberty Engine Committee, which was created to oversee manufacturing development and to recommend improvements and standardizations.

In 1918, Crane cofounded Loening Aeronautical Engineering Corp. with Grover Loening and others, serving as a director. Loening began the development of a two-seater monoplane fighter that would use the Wright-Martin engine. Crane pushed for "lighter and higher-quality bearings as well as the higher-performance characteristics of magnetos and spark plugs..."

=== Wright Aeronautical Corporation ===
At the war's end, Wright-Martin—which had been focused on manufacturing engines for wartime aviation—closed its operations and sold most of its assets. However, $3 million (equivalent to $48,214,286 in 2023) was earmarked to establish the Wright Aeronautical Corporation. Crane was the new company's vice president and chief engineer. He continued to work on advances to engines, including "an L-configuration cylinder head with Ricardo-type high-swirl combustion chambers." He worked for Wright until March 1, 1920. He then became semi-retired.

=== Crane-Simplex Company ===
Wright Aeronautical sold the Simplex Automobile Company assets to Emlen S. Hare and his Hare's Motors in 1920. In November 1922, Crane bought the Simplex assets from Hare, planning to restart production of his vehicles. The Crane-Simplex Company was formed but produced only a few units before declaring bankruptcy.

=== General Motors ===
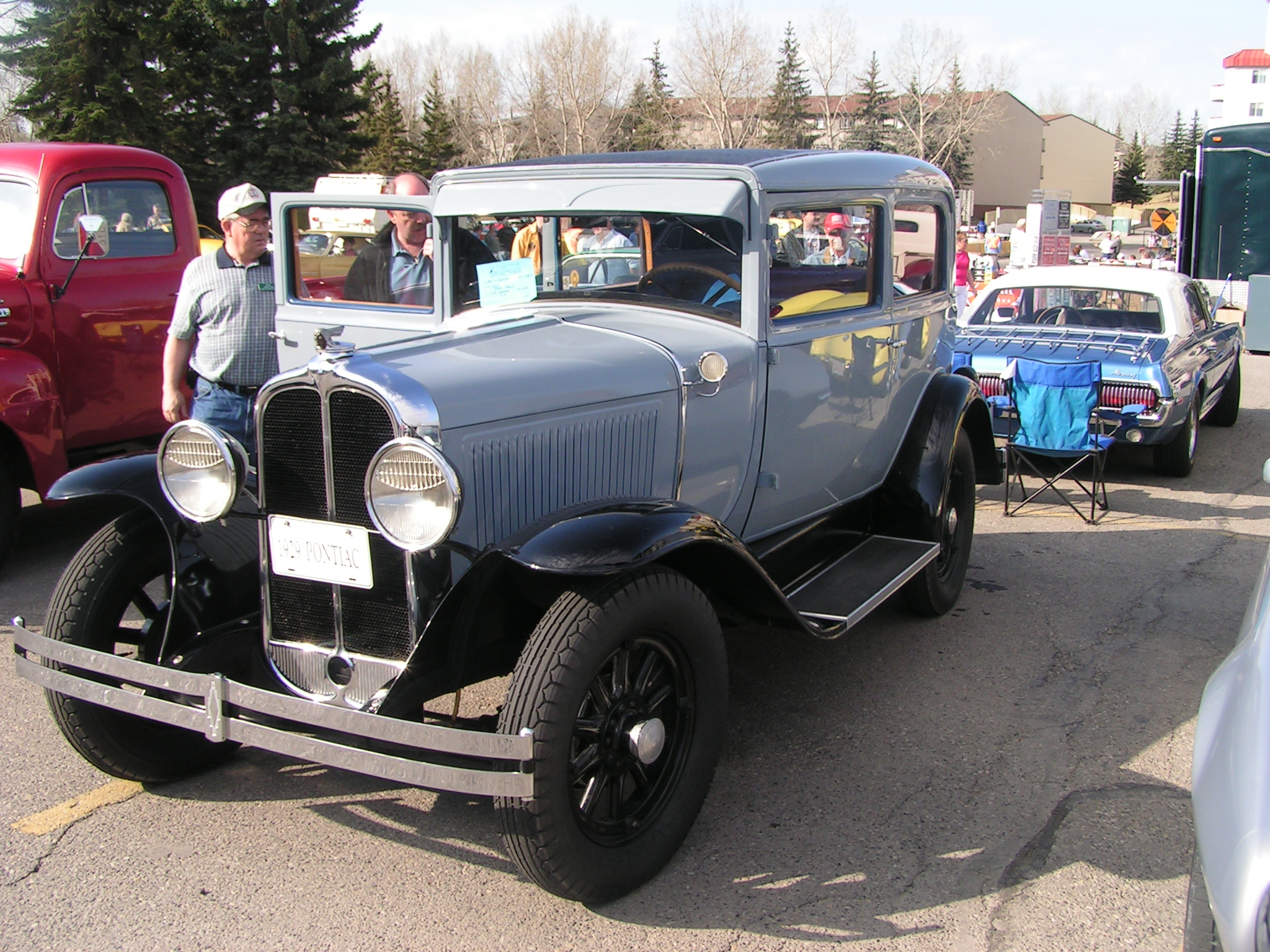
1924 Pontiac 6

On July 30, 1922, Crane became a consulting engineer and technical assistant to Alfred P. Sloan, who was president of General Motors Corporation and a classmate of Crane's at the Massachusetts Institute of Technology. Sloan directed Crane to develop a six-cylinder car in the Chevrolet laboratories. Crane not only designed the engine but also "the only car with a short bore and a low-pressure flood system of oiling." Crane consulted on the development of the Pontiac 6, created using Crane's engine and an elongated Chevrolet chassis with updated radiators and fenders. Hemmings notes, "The crowning achievement that Harry Crane made at GM was his convincing Sloan to use this type of high-turbulence, high-quench cylinder head for the original Pontiac Six engine."

In 1924, Crane told Automobile Trade Journal, "The float carburetor is, to my mind, the greatest single contribution to engineering progress. This development is now practically standard equipment on all automobiles and went a long way toward giving us the flexibility and general performance that we now have." Crane was a consulting engineer for General Motors until he died in 1956.

== Professional affiliations ==
Crane was a member and president of the Society of Automotive Engineers (SAE). In February 1920, he presented a paper on "Possible Effect of Aircraft Engine Development in Automobile Practice" for the national meeting of SAE. The same year, he chaired the SAE Aeronautic Division of the Standards Committee, and helped write the American Air Safety Code for the U.S. Department of Commerce in 1926. In 1920, he also was chairman of the SAE Automobile Lighting Division of the Standards Committee, helping to reduce the glare from car headlights.

In 1923, Crane was vice president of SAE and the research committee chairman. In 1925, now SAE president, he advocated for better automobile headlights. The problems he outlined with current systems were the cost of needed equipment, adjusting the light beam when the car is pitched on its springs, inexpensive cars with inferior equipment, and setting the light beams so that they are adequate—but not blinding to approaching vehicles. Crane suggested that regulations and enforcement were needed to solve the problem.

In 1923, Crane testified at the United States Senate Hearings on the High Cost of Gasoline and Other Petroleum Products. He spoke about experiments conducted by the SAE research committee with the United States Bureau of Standards, which aimed "to determine the economically correct grade of fuel to use" to achieve "the greatest mileage per gallon, with other operating conditions being met." Tests were conducted under different weather conditions, variations in lubrication, and various drivers.

In 1922, he served on the National Advisory Committee for Aeronautics's committee on power plants for aircraft. In 1922 and 1923, he was on the executive committee of the National Research Council's Advisory Board of Highway Research. He was also a member of the American Society of Mechanical Engineers (ASME). In 1931, he represented ASME in an advisory capacity for the Yale University Institute of Human Relations' study of human social problems. He was a member of the American Gas Association, serving on the office labor saving devices committee.

== Personal ==
In the 1920s, Crane lived in New York City at 44 West 44th Street. Later, he lived at the Weylin Hotel, followed by the Waldorf-Astoria Hotel. Starting in 1923, he spent winters in Mountain Lake, Florida. In Florida, he served on the board of the Lake Wales Hospital and was a director of the Mountain Lake Corporation.

He was a member of the Coffee House of New York City, the St. Anthony Club of New York, the St. Anthony Club of Boston, the University Club of New York, Engineers Country Club, Piping Rock Club, the Recess Club of Detroit, Michigan, and the Nassau Country Club where he played tennis and served as president. He also belonged to the Technology Club of New York and Garden City Golf Club.

Crane was a member of the Seawanhaka Corinthian and Quincy yacht clubs, sailing his yachts Tuna and Meriam C.B. from Oyster Bay. He was a member of the American Flying Club and the Aero Club of America, serving as chairman of its technical committee and on its Collier Trophy committee. He was also a member of the Automobile Club of America.

In 1956, Crane died at Roosevelt Hospital in New York City at the age of 81. His funeral was held at First Presbyterian Church on 12th Street in New York City.

== Publications ==
- "Research Promises Fuel Savings." SAE Journal 12 (January 1923): 241
- "Automotive Engineering and its Relation to Aeronautics." ICAC Papers (1920): 81–84
- "Possible Effect of Aircraft Engine Development in Automobile Practice." SAE Journal 14 pt. 1 (April 1919): 240–42
- "The Future Passenger Car." SAE Transactions 14 pt. 2 (1919): 155–156
- "Water and Air Cooled Aviation Motors." Aero World 1:4 (November 1916): 63–67
- "Engines of Dixie IV." The Rudder (October 1911): 177–178
