= Wright-Martin =

American aircraft manufacturer (1916–1919)

Wright-Martin Aircraft Corporation
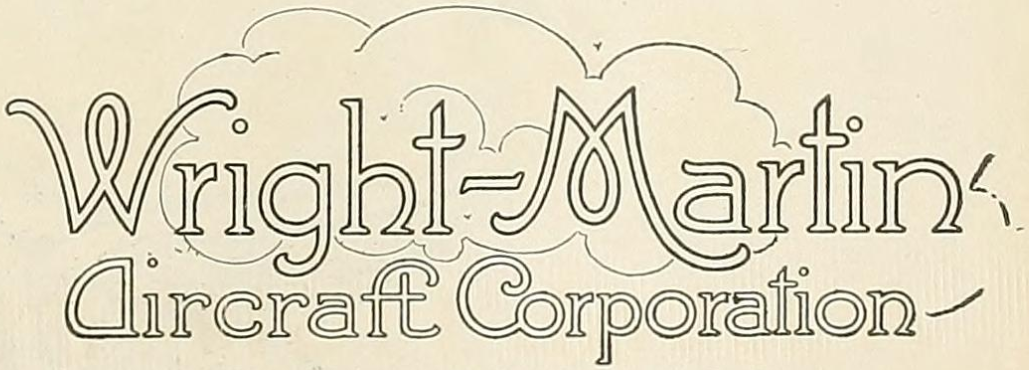
- Industry: Aerospace
- Predecessors: Glenn L. Martin Company; Wright Company
- Founded: 1916
- Defunct: 1919
- Fate: Reformed as Wright Aeronautical in 1919
- Successor: Wright Aeronautical
- Headquarters: New Brunswick, New Jersey, U.S.
- Key people: Glenn L. Martin; Orville Wright
- Subsidiaries: Wright Company; Glenn L. Martin Company; Simplex Automobile Company; Wright Flying Field, Inc.; General Aeronautic Company of America, Inc.

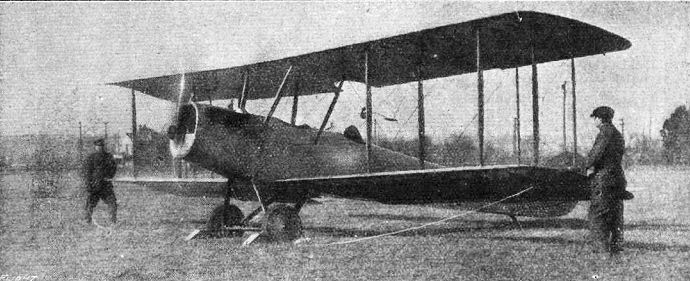
Wright-Martin Model V

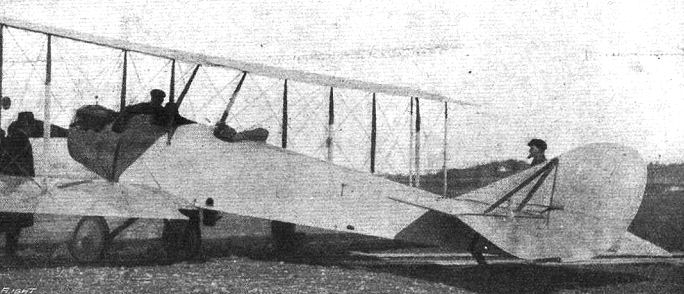
Wright-Martin Model V

Wright-Martin Aircraft Corporation was a short-lived aircraft manufacturing business venture between the Wright Company (after Orville Wright sold the Wright Company and divested himself from it) and Glenn L. Martin.

== History ==
Company officials merged their respective organizations, the Wright Company and the first Glenn L. Martin Company, in September 1916.

The company continued and escalated the Wright brothers patent war with other aircraft manufacturers, until its resolution—under duress from the government, in 1917, at the start of U.S. involvement in World War I—by the cross-licensing agreement developed and managed through the Manufacturers Aircraft Association. Martin resigned in 1917, dissolving the Wright-Martin joint enterprise within a year.

The company manufactured a license-built version of the Hispano-Suiza 8 under the engineering leadership of Henry M. Crane. It was used by Vought VE-7, Vought VE-8, Boeing NB-2, and Loening M-8.

By 1918, the company had a factory in Long Island City, New York. The company was renamed Wright Aeronautical in 1919, and shifted from manufacturing aircraft to manufacturing aircraft engines, developing the pivotal Wright Whirlwind engines which changed aviation dramatically.

Meanwhile, in September 1917 Martin founded his second Glenn L. Martin Company, which remained a major aircraft manufacturer until the 1950s, when it also began developing rockets, missiles, and spacecraft. In 1961, the company merged with the American-Marietta Corporation to become industrial conglomerate (and continued aerospace manufacturer) Martin Marietta; it merged with Lockheed in 1995 to become today's Lockheed Martin, one of the United States' three remaining major large aircraft manufacturers (along with Boeing and Northrop Grumman).

== Aircraft ==
Model name	First flight	Number built	Type
Wright-Martin Model R		14	Single engine biplane reconnaissance airplane
Wright-Martin Model V		1	Single engine biplane reconnaissance airplane
