= Traffic Motor Truck Corporation =

Defunct American motor vehicle manufacturer

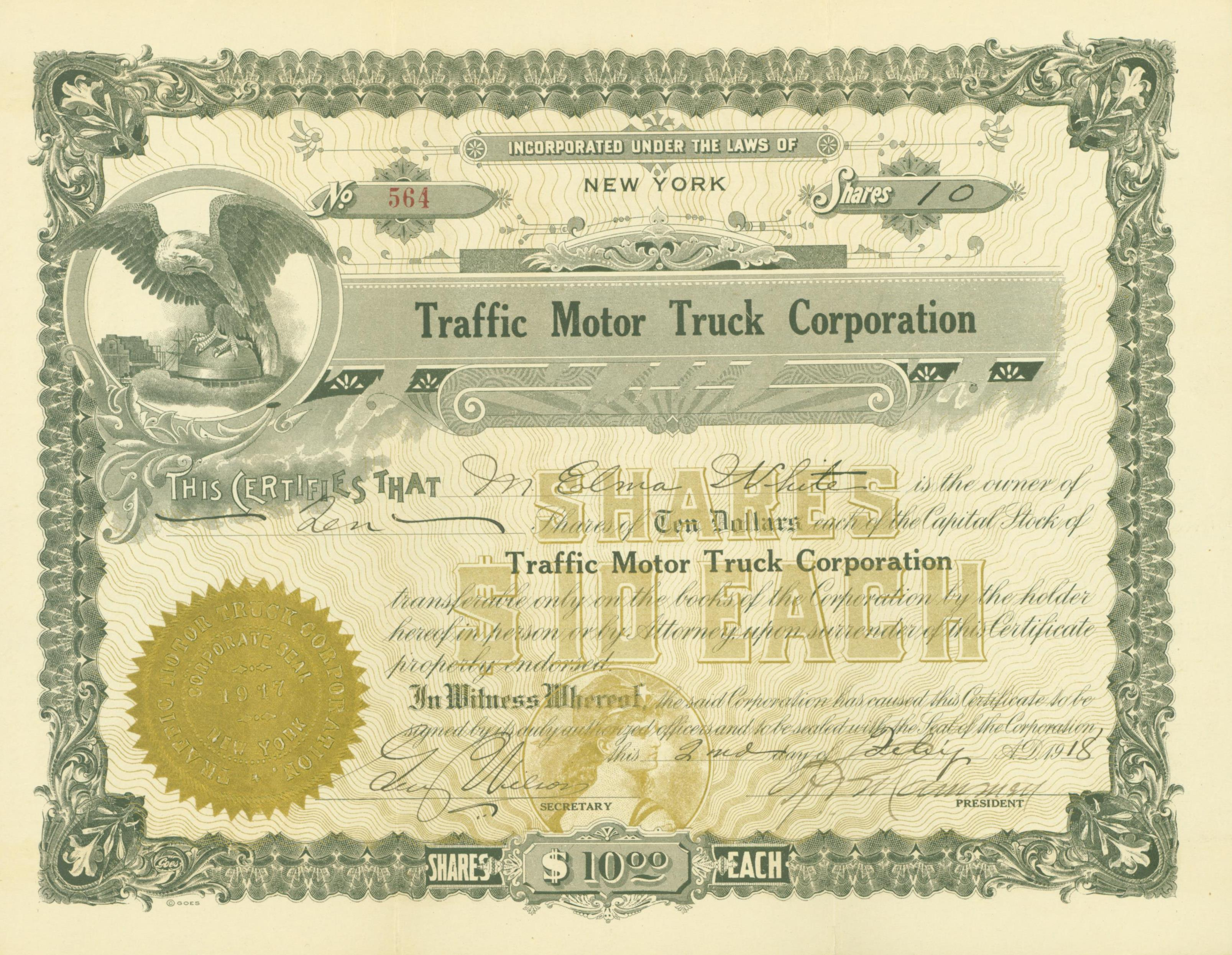
Share of the Traffic Motor Truck Corporation, issued 2. July 1918

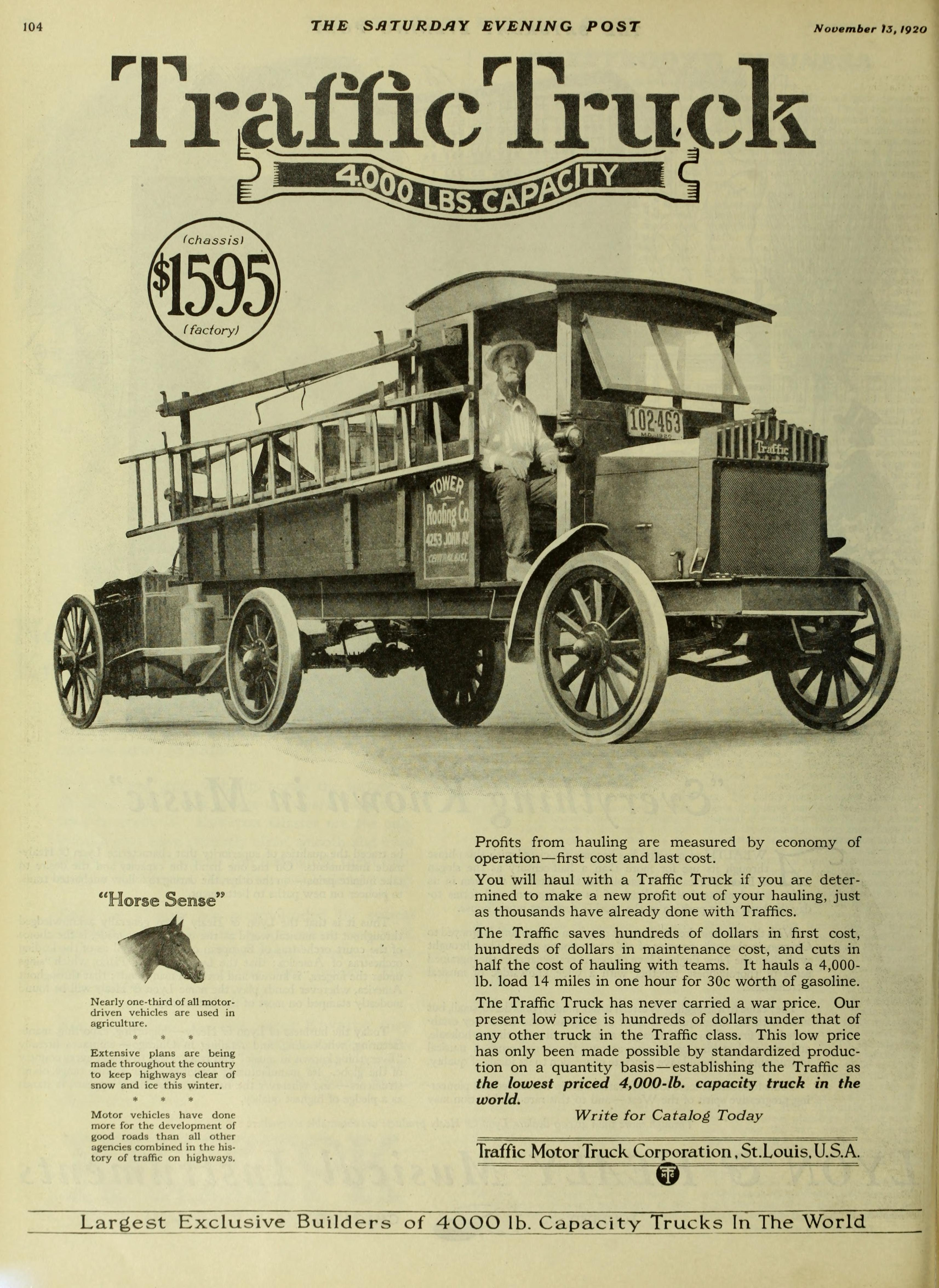

The Traffic Motor Truck Corporation (TMTC) was a St. Louis truck manufacturer from 1917 to 1929. It used Continental engines chiefly, and sometimes Gray Victory engines. The company was based at 5200 North Second Street. Guy C. Wilson was TMTC's president and Theodore C. Brandle was its vice president. Stephen W. Avery was the company's advertising manager.

== Company officers ==
=== Theodore C. Brandle ===
TMTC's vice president, Theodore C. Brandle, was the son of Charles and Belle Brandle. He was born in St. Louis on February 2, 1894. He taught school for 4 years (1910-1914), following which he began working for the Bell Telephone Company, then took a job at an automobile repair shop, and later that same year founded Westcott Motor Sales Company. After changing the company's name to Brandle Motor Company, he sold it to automobile giant Chevrolet. He married in 1917. The same year he became involved with Guy C. Wilson and Harry P. Mammen, and the three of them founded TMTC.

=== Guy C. Wilson ===
Wilson was born on May 1, 1878, in Christian County, Kentucky. He worked in the railway industry until 1904 when he switched to insurance. Having had considerable success in the insurance industry he retired in 1915 to focus on the automobile industry. He became vice-president of the Brandle Motor Company.

=== Harry P. Mammen ===
Harry P. Mammen, was the general sales manager for the Westcott Motor Car Company of Springfield, Ohio. In 1917 he joined with Brandle and Wilson to form the Traffic Motor Truck Corporation.

== 2 Ton ==
Produced in 1918 with prices starting at $1,195, rising to $1,395 in 1919, $1,495 in 1920 and $1,595 by late 1920 (respectively as of 2025: $25,579, $25,905, $24,027 and $25,634). The truck was sold virtually as a rolling chassis with an engine and seat. The advertisement described the truck as being able to cover 14 miles in an hour with a 4,000 lb load. It had a 4-cylinder 40 hp 239 cubic inch overhead valve Continental Red Seal engine, Covert transmission, Borg and Beck disk clutch, Kingston magneto with impulse starter, Russel rear axle with internal gear and roller bearings, standard Fisk tyres, 133 inch wheel base, and an oil cup lubricating system. Production was said to be one every 45 minutes. The trucks were also exported to such places and Guatemala and El Salvador.

The 1921 advertisement stated the Tip Top Bottling Company of St Louis had bought 9. The Breen Monument Co of St. Louis also used one of these truck in its business.

== Other models ==
In 1922 1 1/2-ton, 3-ton, and 4-ton models were introduced. A sales letter dated 17 June 1922 cited the available models being a 6,000 lb heavy transport for $1,995 and a Speedboy for $1,695.00. Both of these models used Continental Motors with Bosch magneto's.

== Merger ==
In July 1922 the company merged with Associated Motor Industries, which made several makes of automobile and trucks. Traffic's Wilson and Brandle were appointed to Associated's Board. The plan was to continue making Traffic Trucks as well as some of Associated's automobiles at the Traffic Motor Truck manufacturing plant in St Louis. Traffic trucks were also to be assembled at Associated's plants in Boston, Indianapolis, Louisville and Oakland.

Associated owned the Kentucky Wagon Manufacturing Company, which made the Jackson four-wheel drive truck, and the Old Hickory truck. They also made Jackson, Dixie Flyer, and National automobiles.

== Gallery ==
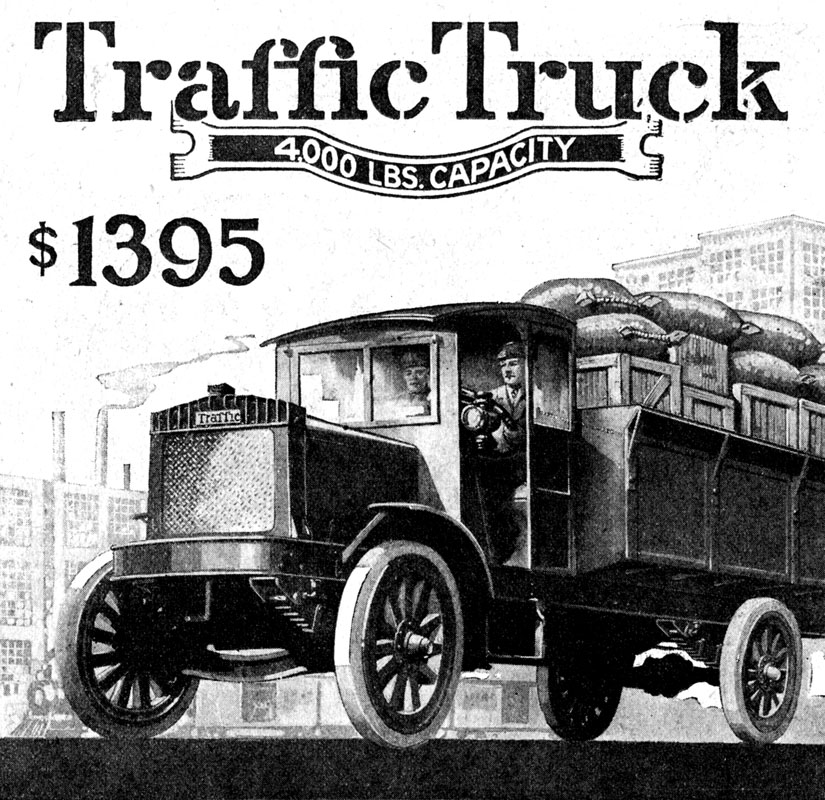
Traffic Motor Truck Corp. ad that ran in the May 19, 1919 Country Gentleman magazine.

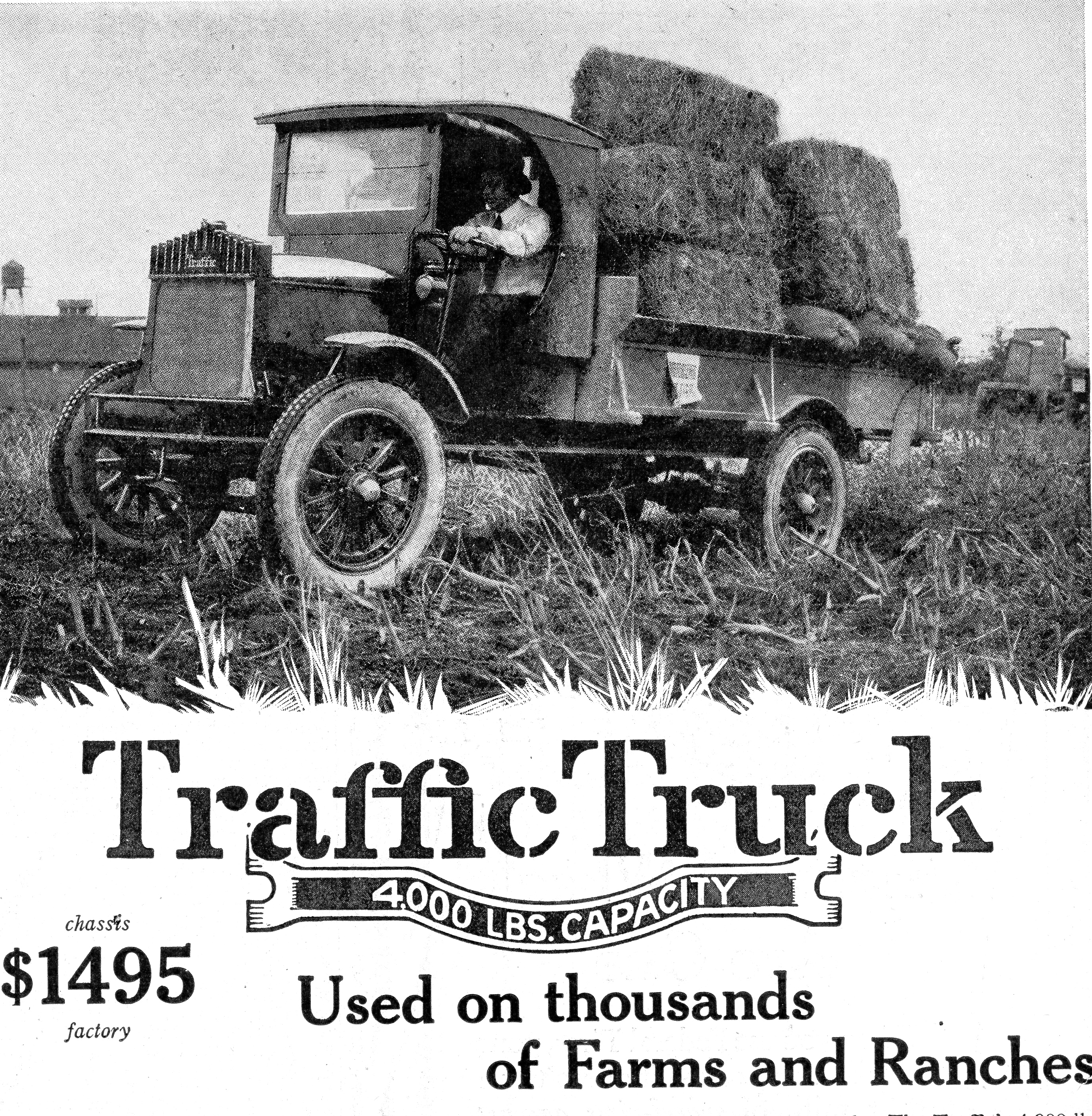
June 12, 1920, Country Gentleman magazine: Traffic trucks are made in St. Louis.

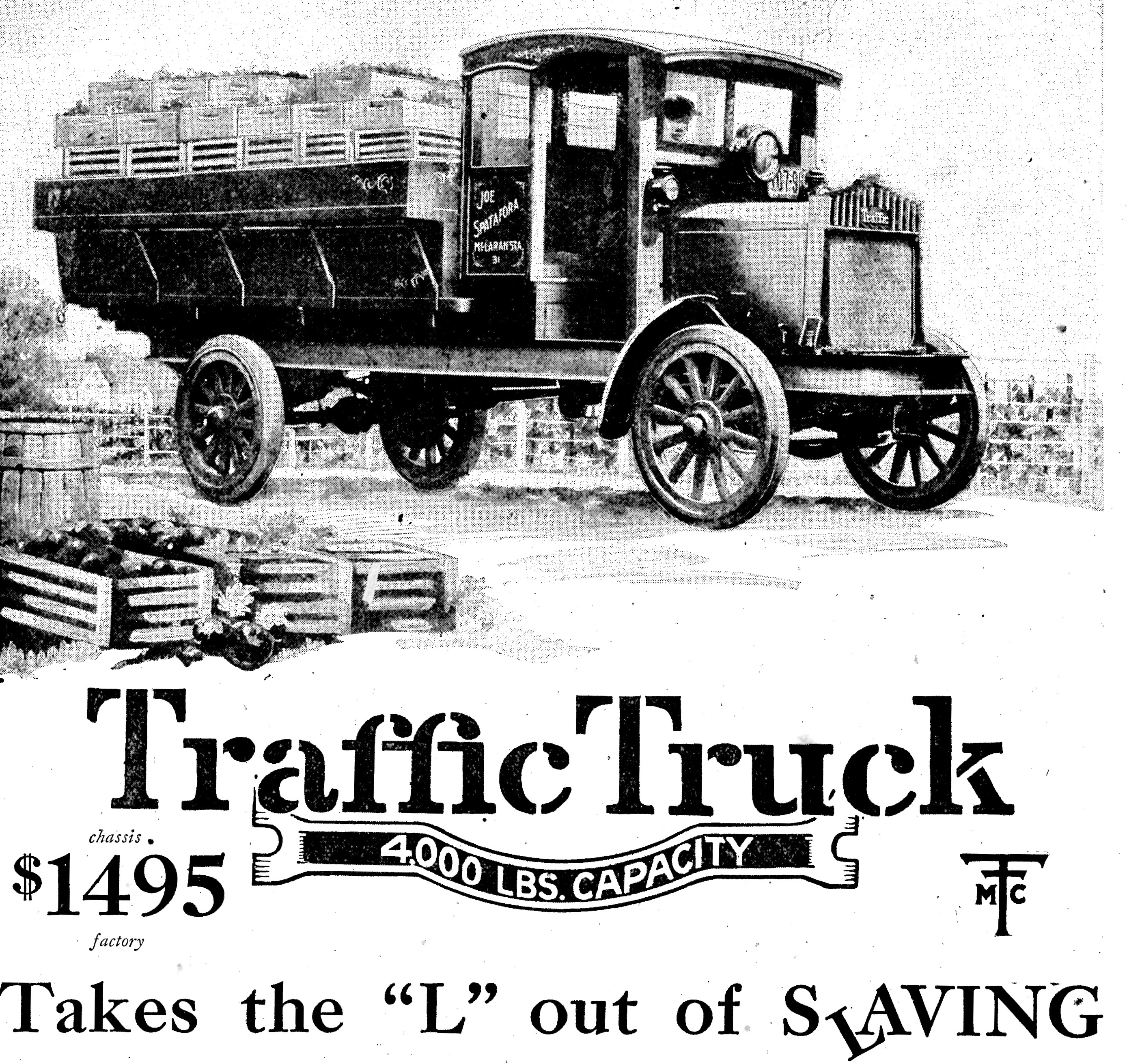
Traffic Trucks were made in St. Louis. The ad was on July 10, 1920 Country Gentleman.

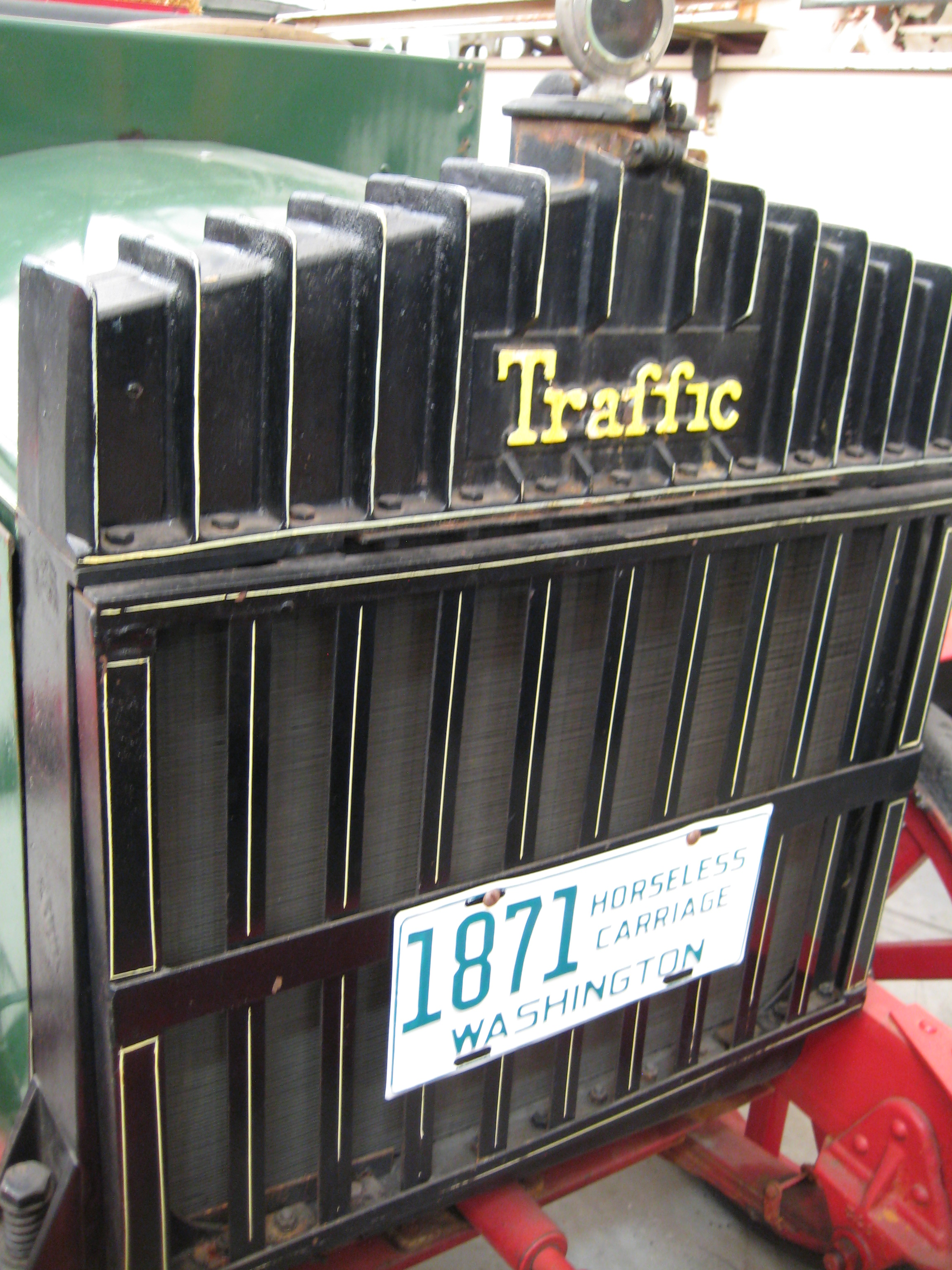
Seen at the 2011 LeMay Open House.
