= Associated Motor Industries =

Not related to Associated Motor Industries Sdn Bhd of Malaysia or the fictional National Motors Corporation.

Associated Motor Industries of Dayton, Ohio, was founded in 1922. It was a merger of a number of existing automobile, truck, and parts manufacturers with the intention of standardising production and obtaining economies of scale. The company was renamed the National Motors Corporation in 1923. By 1924 it had ceased production.

== Merged companies ==
The companies initially involved were:

- National Motor Car and Vehicle Corporation, Indianapolis
- Covert Gear Corporation, Lockport, New York - transmission and clutch makers
- Recording and Computing Machines Company, Dayton, Ohio - ignition, magneto, starter, battery and generator manufacturers
- Jackson Motors Corporation, Jackson, Michigan
- Kentucky Wagon Manufacturing Company, Louisville, Kentucky - manufacturer of the Dixie Flyer
- Saginaw Sheet Metal Works, Saginaw, Michigan
- Traffic Motor Truck Corporation, St. Louis, Missouri
- Murray-Tregurtha Corporation, Boston, Mass - manufacturers of gasoline engines
- H F Holbrook Company, New York - manufacturers of automobile bodies.

== Company directors ==
The company officers were:

- Wilfred I Ohmer, Chairman of the Board - Recording and Computing Machines Company
- Louis Ruthenburg of Dayton, President - former General Manager of General Motors Delco Light plant
- Vice-Presidents
  - Alwin (or Alvin) A Gloetzner, Lockport, New York - Covert Gear Corporation
  - Robert V Board, Louisville, Kentucky - Kentucky Wagon Works
  - Thoedore C Brandle, St Louis, Missouri - Traffic Motor Truck Corporation
  - George M Dickson, Indianapolis - National Motor Car
- Other Directors
  - James R Duffin, Louisville - attorney
  - Harry G. Stoddard, Worcester, Mass of Wyman-Gordon
  - H V Hale, Saginaw, Michigan - Saginaw Sheet Metal Works
  - H J Linkert, Dayton
  - C L Halliday, Jackson, Michigan
  - W W Sterling, Jackson
  - C L V Exselsen, Chicago
  - Guy Wilson, St Louis - Traffic Motor Truck Corporation
  - Buell Hollister, New York
  - H F Hollister, New York
  - M Douglas Flattery, Boston

== Mission statement ==
At its commencement, the company stated that it intended to reduce prices without reducing wages, provide $35 million in dealers’ finance funding, employ 20 000 skilled mechanics, continue manufacturing all existing makes in greater numbers, and freight free anywhere east of the Rocky Mountains.
