= Cartercar =

Defunct American motor vehicle manufacturer

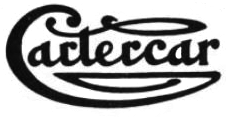

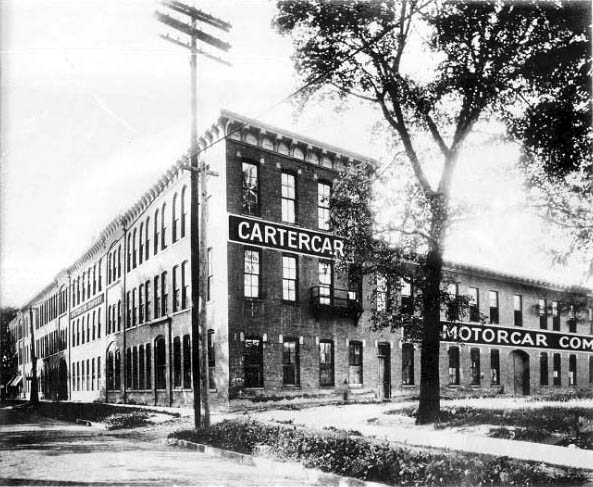
- Cartercar factory located at 220-230; 21st Street in Detroit, MI (1907)
- Type: Private (1905–09); Subsidiary (1909–15)
- Industry: Automotive
- Founded: 1905
- Founder: Byron J Carter
- Defunct: 1915; 111 years ago
- Fate: Acquired by General Motors in 1909
- Headquarters: Detroit and Pontiac, Michigan, United States
- Products: Automobiles, auto parts
- Parent: General Motors

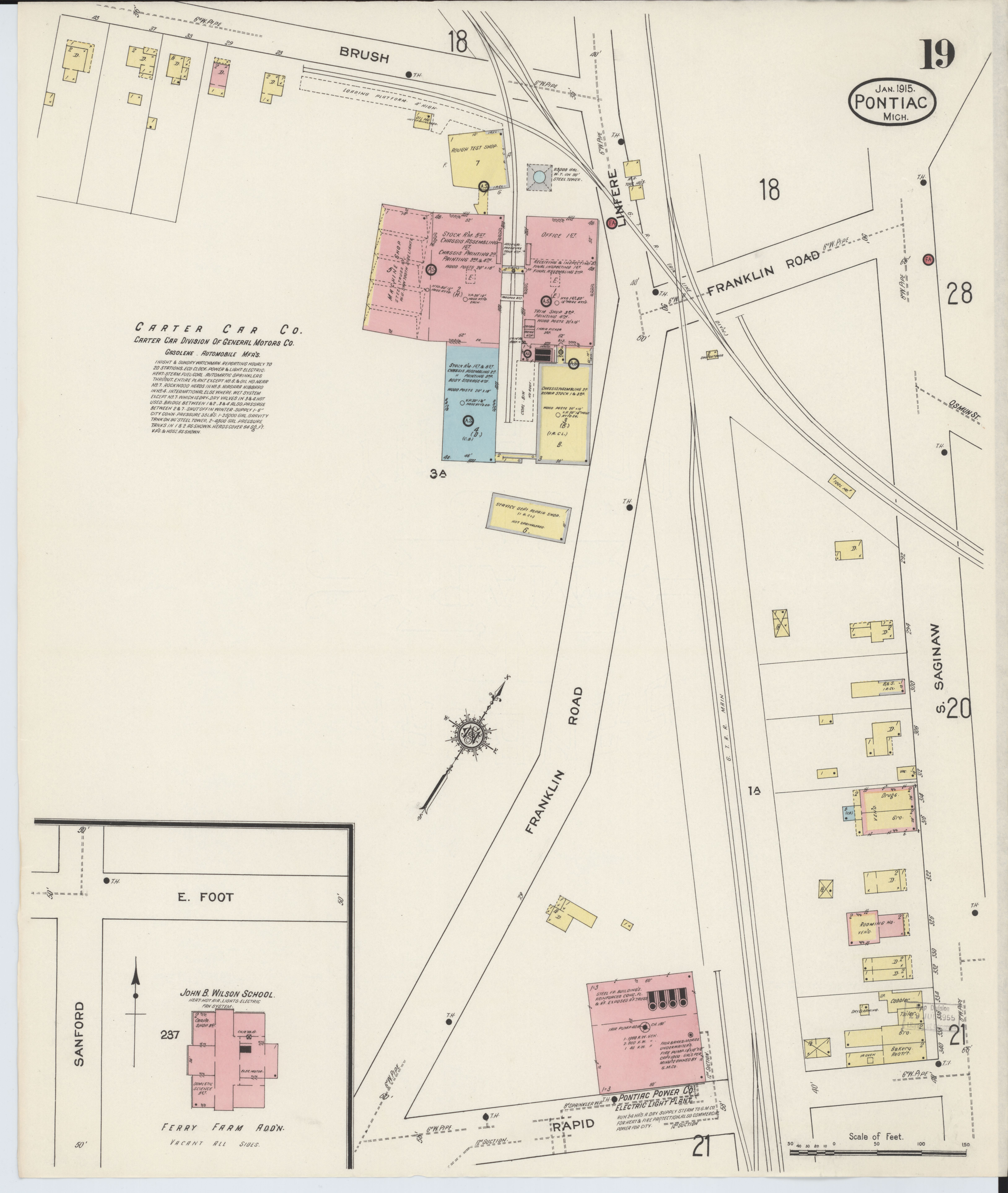
Cartercar plant (1915)

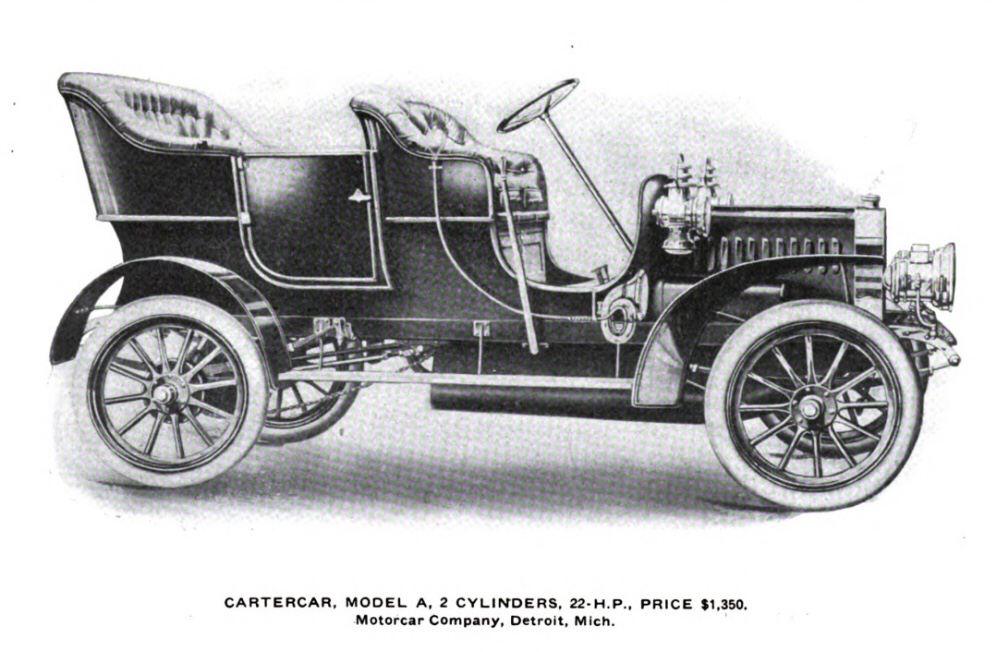
Cartercar Model A (1908)

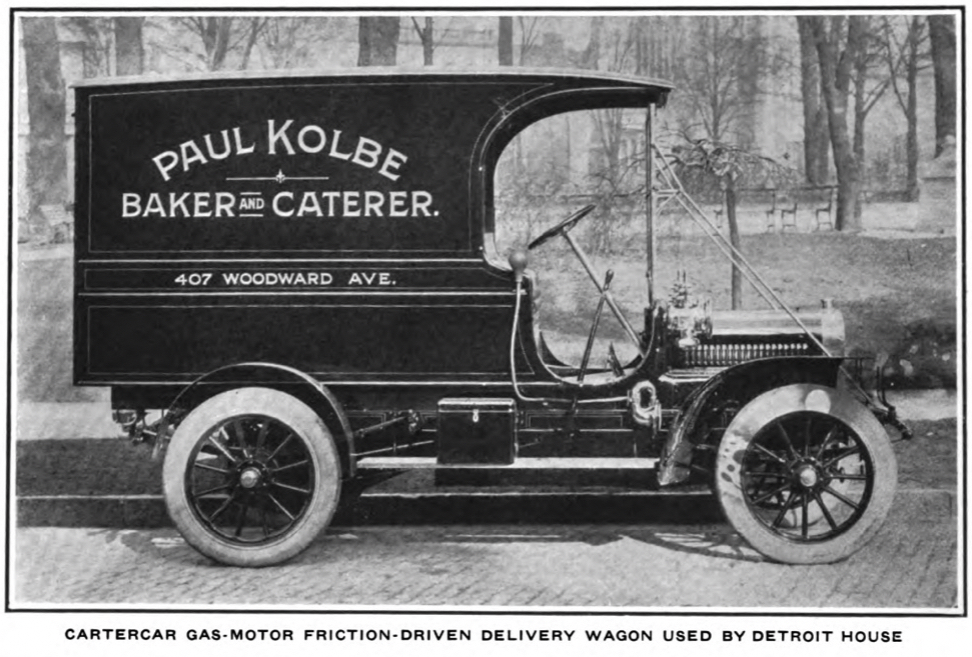
Cartercar (1909)

Cartercar was an American brass era automobile manufacturing company established in 1905 in Jackson, Michigan, and founded by Byron J. Carter. After several relocations in other cities, Cartercar was acquired by General Motors in 1909.

== History ==
=== Beginning ===
After leaving the Jackson Automobile Company due to a disagreement with his business partners over the choice of transmissions in 1905, Byron J. Carter formed the Motorcar Company in Jackson. The firm relocated to Detroit by the end of the year, due to having financing there. Starting in 1907, the company was named Cartercar Company and was relocated to Pontiac, thereupon merging with the makers of the Pontiac High wheeler. The Cartercar was given a warm reception in the press, largely due to the friction drive transmission, which was a sort of forerunner of the CVT of today, as both offered an infinite number of engine speeds. At 4,000 miles, the paper fiber rims that were part of the friction-drive could be replaced for no more than US$5 ($179 in 2025 dollars), which was less than half the price that would be expended on grease packing in a regular geared transmission.

=== Sale to General Motors ===
Sales more than doubled between the first and second full years of production, from 101 in 1906 to 264 in 1907. The next year sales were up again, now at 325. On October 26, 1909, Cartercar was bought by General Motors in the acquisition spree that William Durant went on after founding GM. In explaining the reason he purchased Cartercar, Durant said:

"They say I shouldn't have bought Cartercar. Well, how was anyone to know that Carter wasn't to be the thing? It had the friction drive and no other car had it. How could I tell what these engineers would say next?"

Durant lost control of GM in 1910, and by the time he had regained control in 1915, the GM board had already decided to discontinue the Cartercar, largely because sales never approached the 1000-2000 annually that Durant had predicted. The GM board decided to use the factory instead to produce the Oakland.

=== Powertrain ===
The company began with a flat-twin engine; this was used alongside vertical fours in the 1909 range of cars. By 1910, four-cylinder engines were the sole motor available. Two models, both pair-cast fours, appeared in 1912; the Model R was 4160 cc, while the Model S was 5437 cc. Each had a single chain drive. Even though there were other friction-drive cars on the market at the time, such as Lambert, Metz, and Petrel, none of them lasted as long or were as well known as the Cartercar. Because its friction-drive transmission allowed selection of any ratio rather than having fixed gear positions, the Cartercar was advertised as "The Car of a Thousand Speeds." Another ad touted "It's Hard to Improve a Cartercar."

== Gallery ==
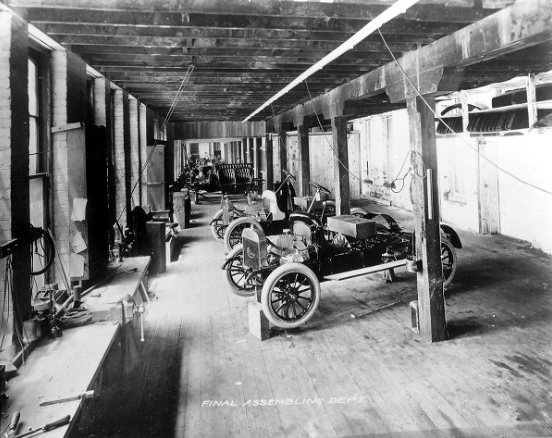
Interior of the final assembling dept.

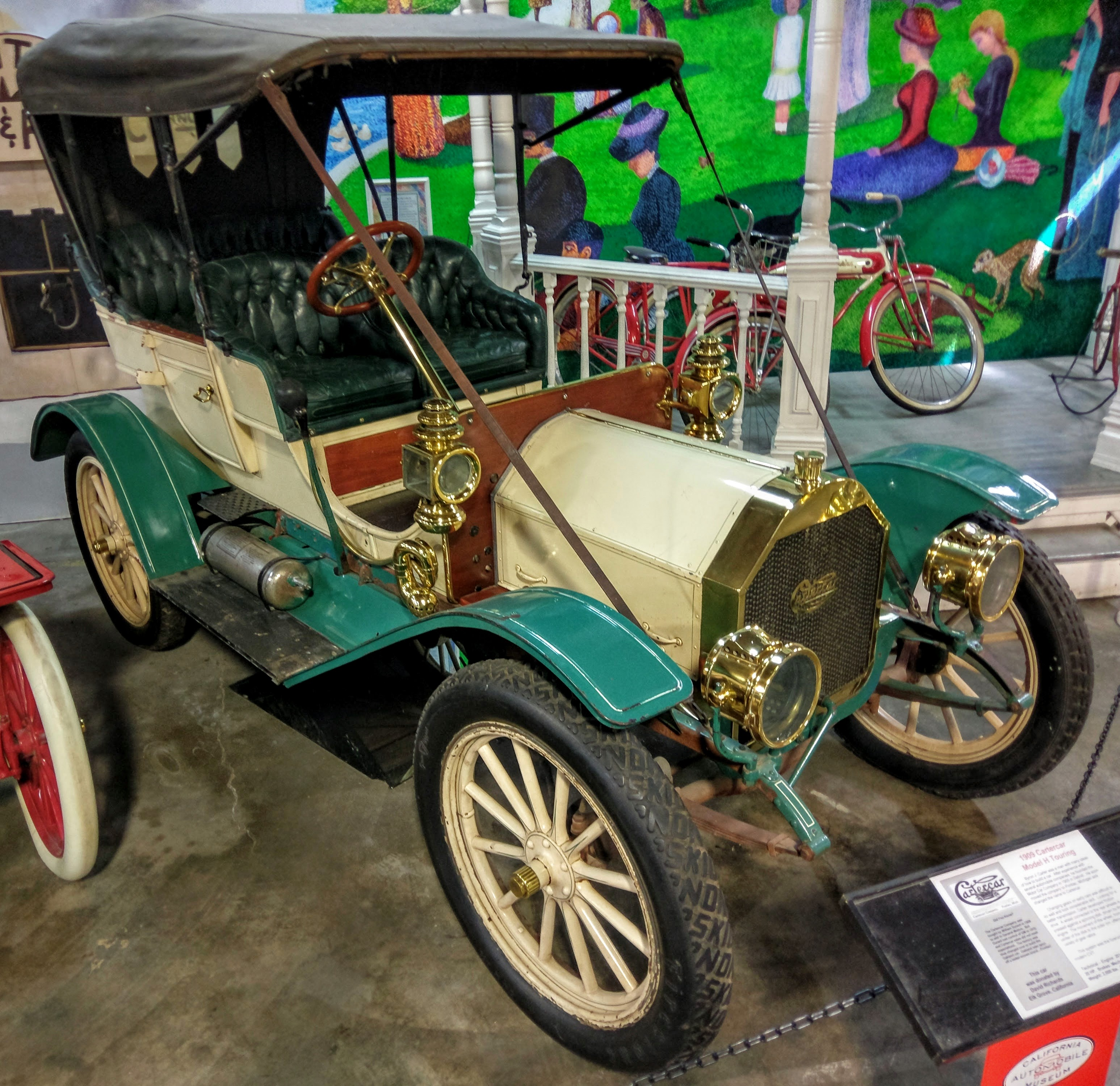
1909 Cartercar Model H Touring

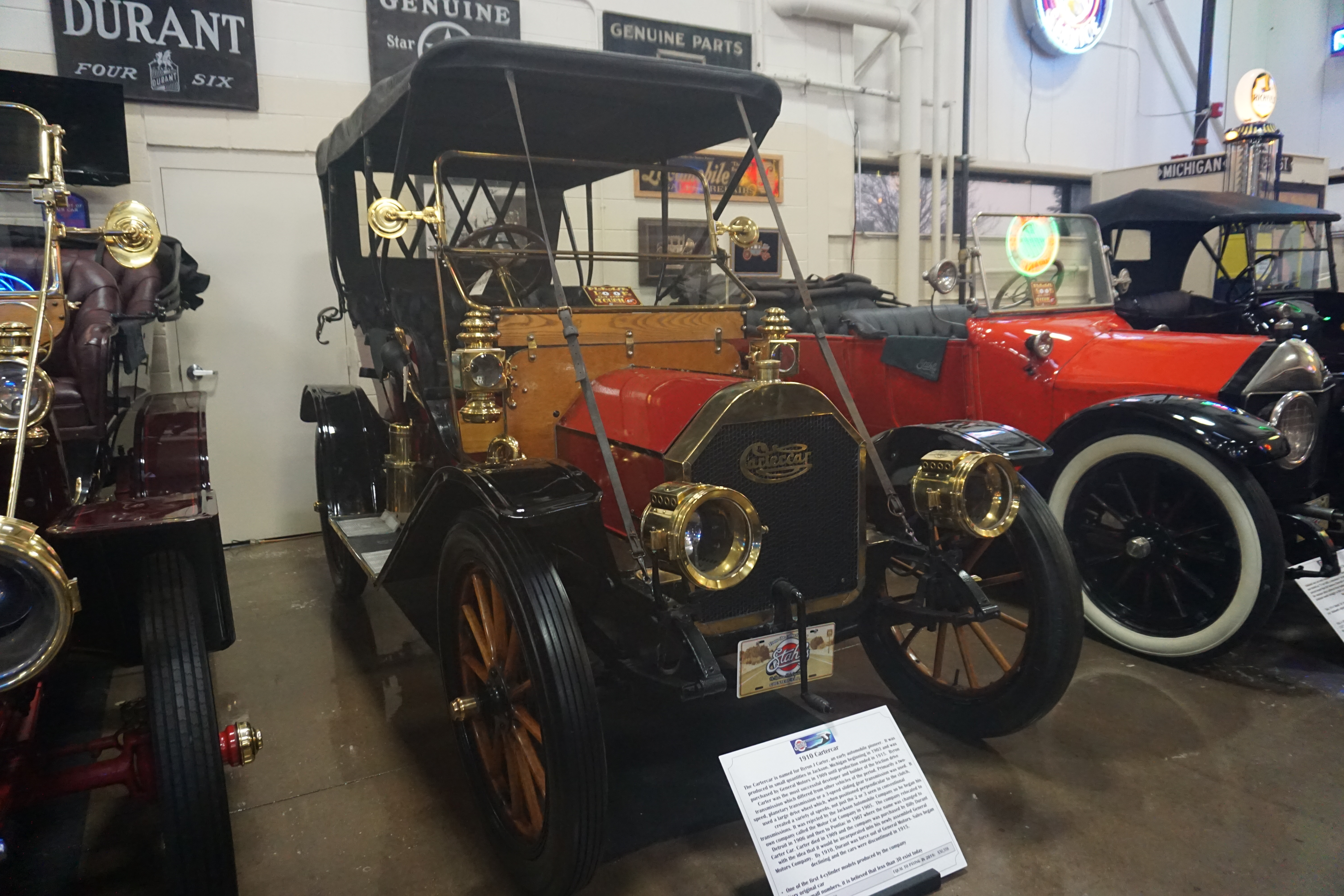
1910 Cartercar

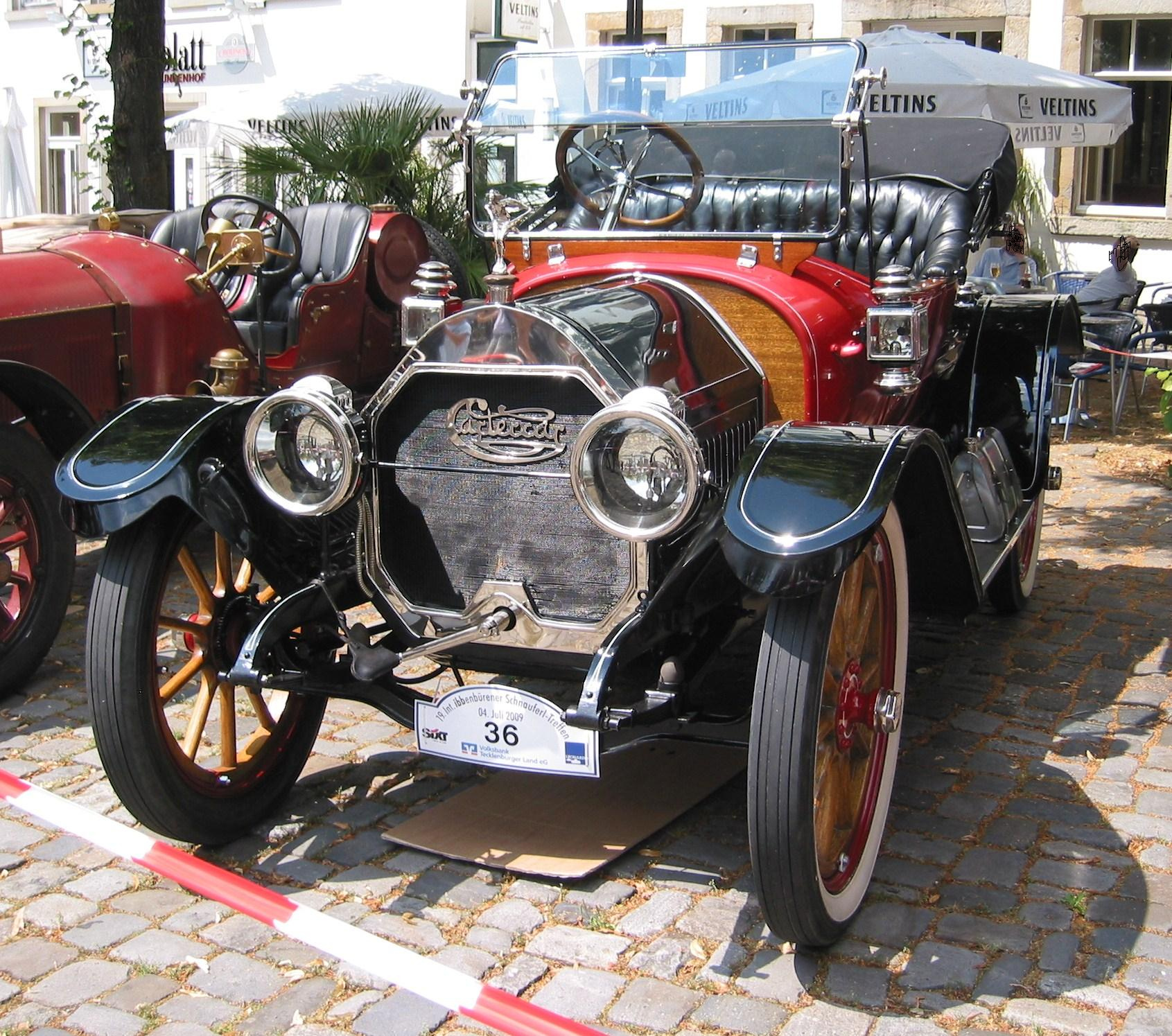
1912 Cartercar

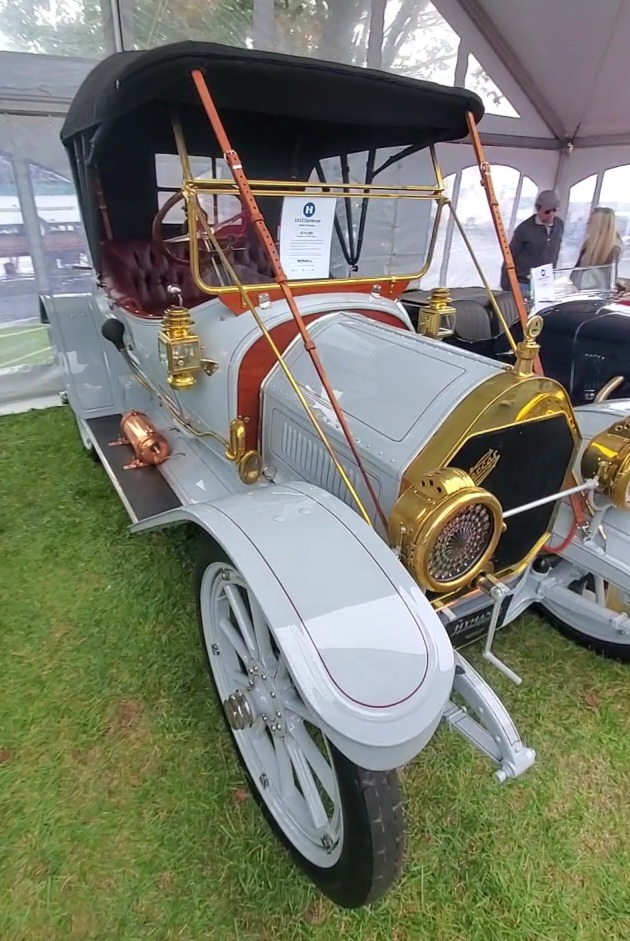
1912 Cartercar Model R (#6678). One of three known to exist

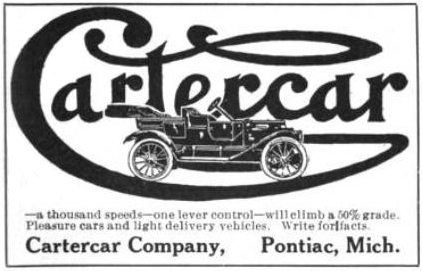
1912 ad
