= Byron Carter =

American automotive pioneer (1863–1908)

Byron J. Carter
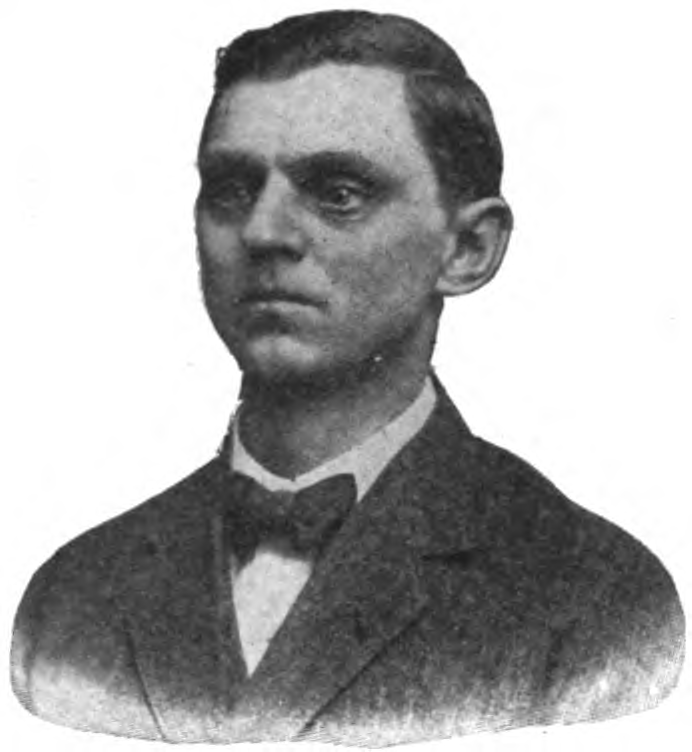
- c. 1908
- Born: August 17, 1863; Jackson, Michigan
- Died: April 6, 1908 (aged 44); Detroit, Michigan
- Occupation: Automotive pioneer
- Known for: Founder of Jackson Automobile Company and Cartercar

Byron J. Carter (August 17, 1863 – April 6, 1908) was an American automotive pioneer. He was a founding partner of the Jackson Automobile Company, and founder of the Cartercar Company.

== Early life and experience ==
Byron J. Carter was born on August 17, 1863, in Jackson County, Michigan, to Squire B. Carter and Martha Crum. His grandfather, Peter T. Carter, was an early settler in Spring Arbor Township, Michigan. In 1885, Byron Carter established the Steam Job Printing and Rubber Stamp Manufacturing business in at 167 Main St., Jackson. In 1894, with his father, he started a bicycle and sunrise store in Jackson on the corner of Courtland and Jackson streets. Two years later, they returned to the printing business by starting the United States Tag Co. During his years of working at Steam Job Printing, Carter gained experience with steam engines, which gained him a patent for the three-cylinder engine, his first engine for the 1902 Jaxon steam car. He was also granted a patent for a friction transmission, a feature of the Cartercar.

== Jackson Automobile Company ==
On July 19, 1902, Byron J. Carter, manager of a Jackson bicycle shop, along with founding partners, George A. Matthews, a buggy manufacturer, and Charles Lewis, once Jackson's biggest employer as owner of a spring axle company, formed the Jackson Automobile Company, on Hupp Street, Jackson. Carter was its first vice president. In 1905 he left to form the Motorcar Company in Jackson, featuring his friction drive car and naming it “Cartercar.” The new variable speed transmission used friction discs, not gears, and also allowed the car to brake by reversing the lever. Carter developed his friction-drive system with parts from a corn sheller. Responding to the problem of other friction-drive cars failing in wet conditions, he developed an aluminum friction disc with a cardboard traverse wheel lining.

== Cartercar ==
In 1905, Carter found financial backing from Detroit for the Cartercar and relocated the company to Pontiac, Michigan. The Cartercar Company attracted the attention of William C. Durant, co-founder of General Motors. Durant liked the car's friction drive, and thought Cartercar would have a great future, and so General Motors bought the company on October 26, 1909. But by 1910, Durant was ousted from GM. When the Cartercar failed to meet Durant's sales predictions, GM limited production and discontinued the Cartercar after the 1916 model. GM converted the factory to production of Oaklands and the Cartercar name was automotive history.

== Legacy ==
Byron J. Carter died April 6, 1908, in Detroit, after developing pneumonia as a result of injuries he sustained to his jaw when he tried to hand crank start a car stranded on the Belle Isle bridge near Detroit. At the time of his death, he was vice president and general superintendent of the Motorcar Company of Detroit. Carter's death was the impetus for Charles Kettering and Henry M. Leland to develop the electric self-starter. Carter was survived by his widow, Dorothy “Della” Carter, and two children, Rachel Lucretia Carter, who later married Clifford Maurice Sparks, 1916 All-American football player at the University of Michigan; and Kenneth G. Carter.
