= Dixie Flyer (automobile) =

Defunct American motor vehicle manufacturer

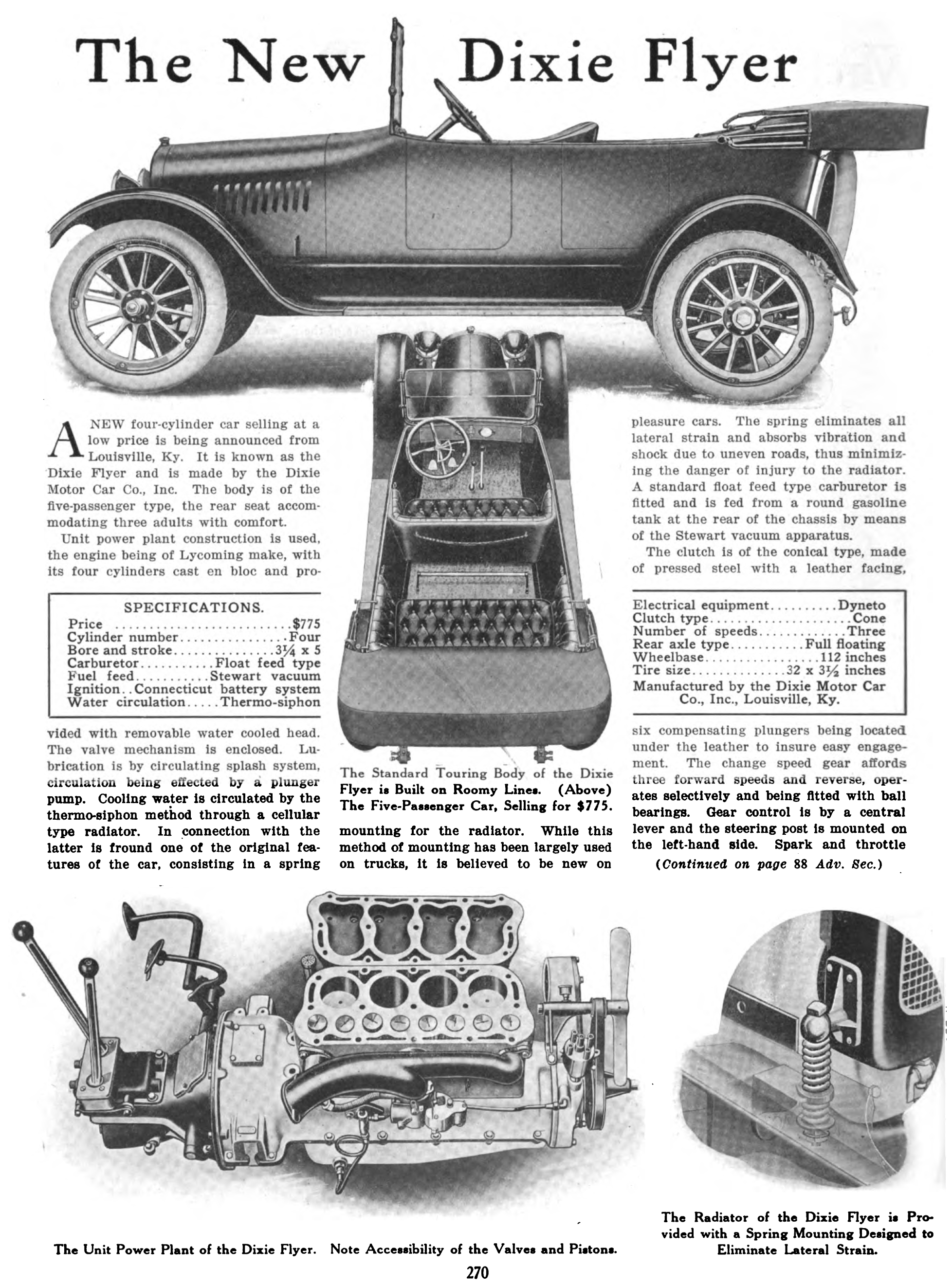
- A Dixie Flyer advertisement in Horseless Age, 1916.

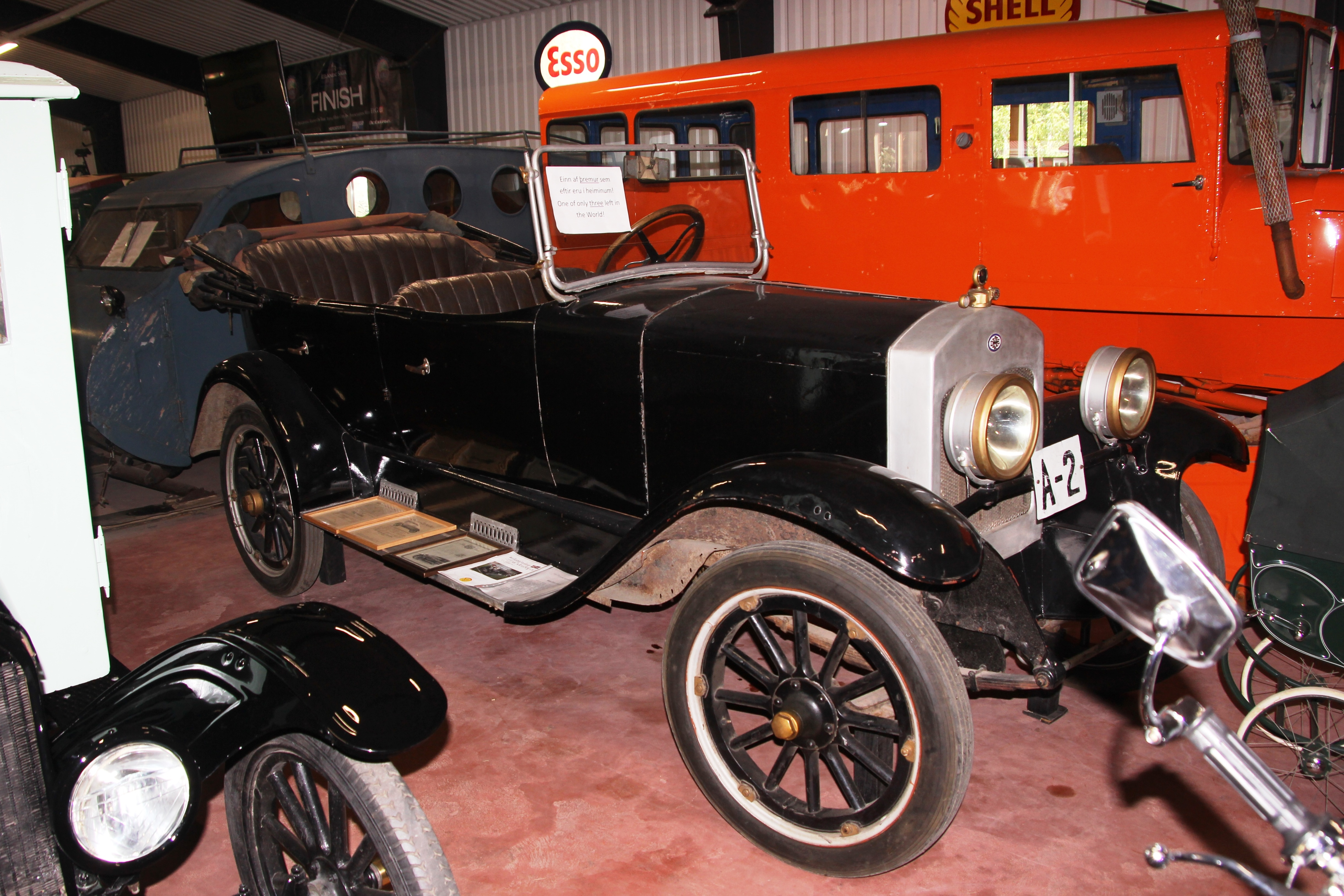
One of three Dixie flyers preserved worldwide. Built in 1919, registered with the Icelandic license plate A-2, now in the Transportation Museum at Ystafel, Iceland

The Dixie Flyer was an automobile built in Louisville, Kentucky from 1916 until 1923. Dixie Flyers were marketed under the slogan of "The Logical Car." They may be classified as Brass Era cars or vintage cars.

The origins of the company can be traced back to 1878, when the Kentucky Wagon Manufacturing Company was established. In 1912, the local Electric Vehicle Company was acquired, which marked the entrance of Kentucky Wagon into the automotive field. An electric car called the Kentucky Electric was planned, but did not come to pass. Erroneously, some lists of old automobiles list the Kentucky Electric from the Kentucky Wagon company in this period. The sole electric automotive product of the company was the Urban Electric truck, produced from 1912 to 1916. In 1914, the Hercules Motor Car Company of New Albany across the Ohio River contracted with Kentucky Wagon to build bodies for their cars. Hercules went out of business in 1915, with its assets acquired by Kentucky Wagon.

There appear to have been plans to continue the Hercules name, but the Hercules instead formed the nucleus of the new Dixie Flyer in 1916. All cars had four-cylinder engines, originally supplied by Lycoming and later by Herschell-Spillman. Two distinctive features of early Dixie Flyers were their vertical windshields that were integrated into the curved cowl dash, and the spring-mounted radiators. This latter feature was to reduce vibration, as well as strain on the chassis. The Shadburne Brothers acquired the company for a very brief period in 1917, but ownership quickly reverted to Kentucky Wagon. The Firefly speedster of 1922 was the sportiest Dixie Flyer, unfortunately, it was their last new model as well.

The post-World War I recession claimed another victim in the Dixie Car company. Truck production was also discontinued at this time; however, wagons were still produced for almost another decade. Dixie Flyer, National and Jackson, were all merged into Associated Motor Industries and Corporation in 1923. Dixie Flyers and Jacksons were henceforth discontinued. Many of the last Dixie Flyers were converted to Nationals by simply exchanging the Dixie radiator emblems and hubcaps with National ones.

In June 2010 a restored 1922 Dixie Flyer was returned from Melbourne, Australia to Louisville, where it will be displayed at Kentucky Trailer, the successor business to Kentucky Wagon.
