= National Motor Vehicle Company =

Defunct American motor vehicle manufacturer

- Type: Automobile Manufacturing
- Industry: Automotive
- Founded: 1900; 126 years ago
- Founder: Arthur C. Newby
- Defunct: 1923; 103 years ago
- Fate: Consolidated
- Successor: Associated Motor Industries
- Headquarters: Indianapolis, Indiana, United States
- Products: Automobiles
- Production output: 23,558 (1901-1924)

The National Motor Vehicle Company was an American manufacturer of automobiles in Indianapolis, Indiana, between 1900 and 1924. One of its presidents, Arthur C. Newby, was also one of the investors who created the Indianapolis Motor Speedway.

The company first concentrated on electric vehicles but soon began producing gasoline-engined cars. National produced a range of four, six, and twelve-cylinder passenger vehicles, as well as numerous successful racing cars. In 1923, National was merged into Associated Motor Industries, which subsequently went out of business in 1924.

== History ==
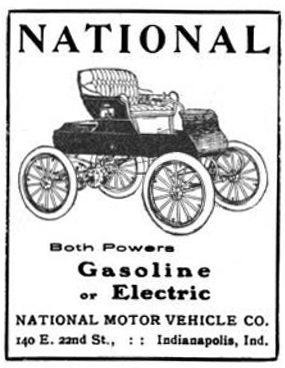
1905 National - Electric or gasoline

=== Production models ===
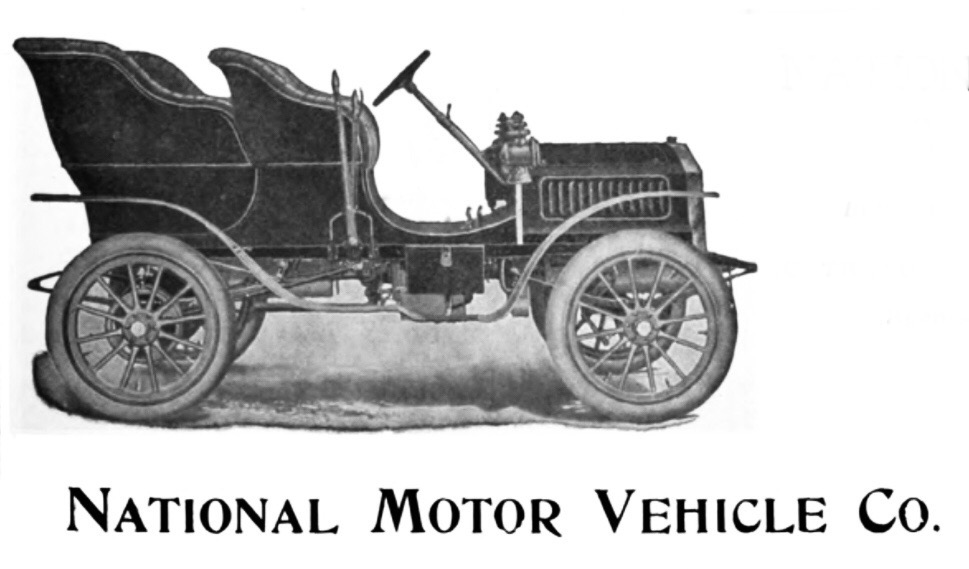
National Model A (1904)

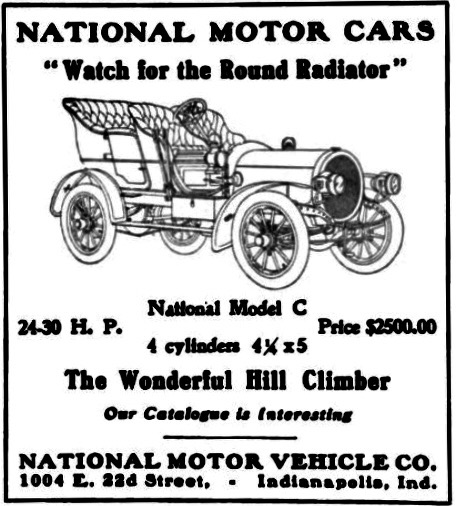
National Model C (1905)

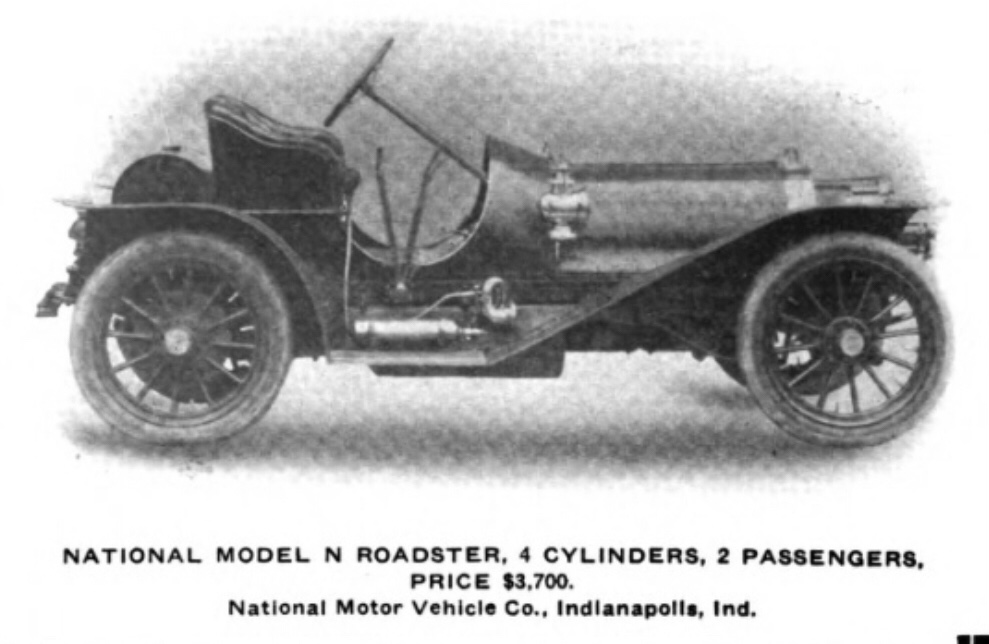
National Model N (1908)

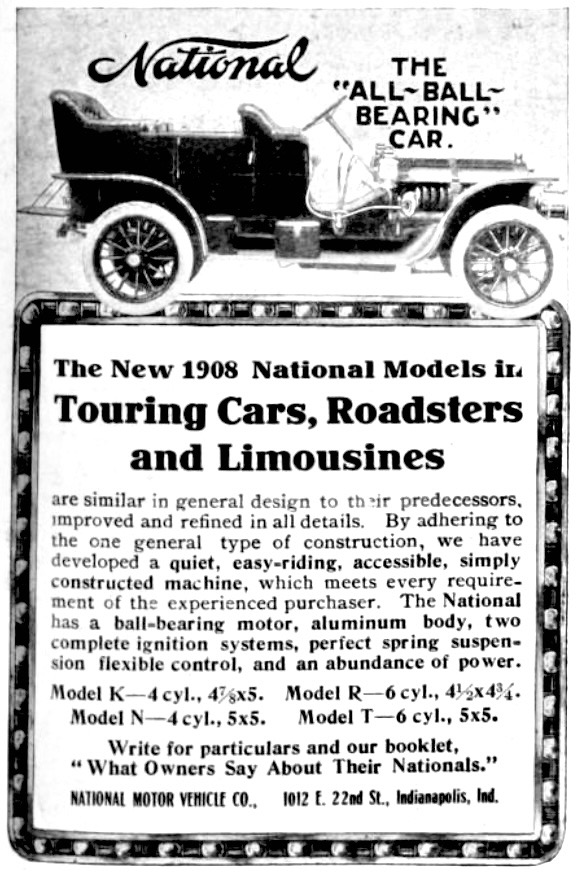
National Model K, R, N, T (1908)

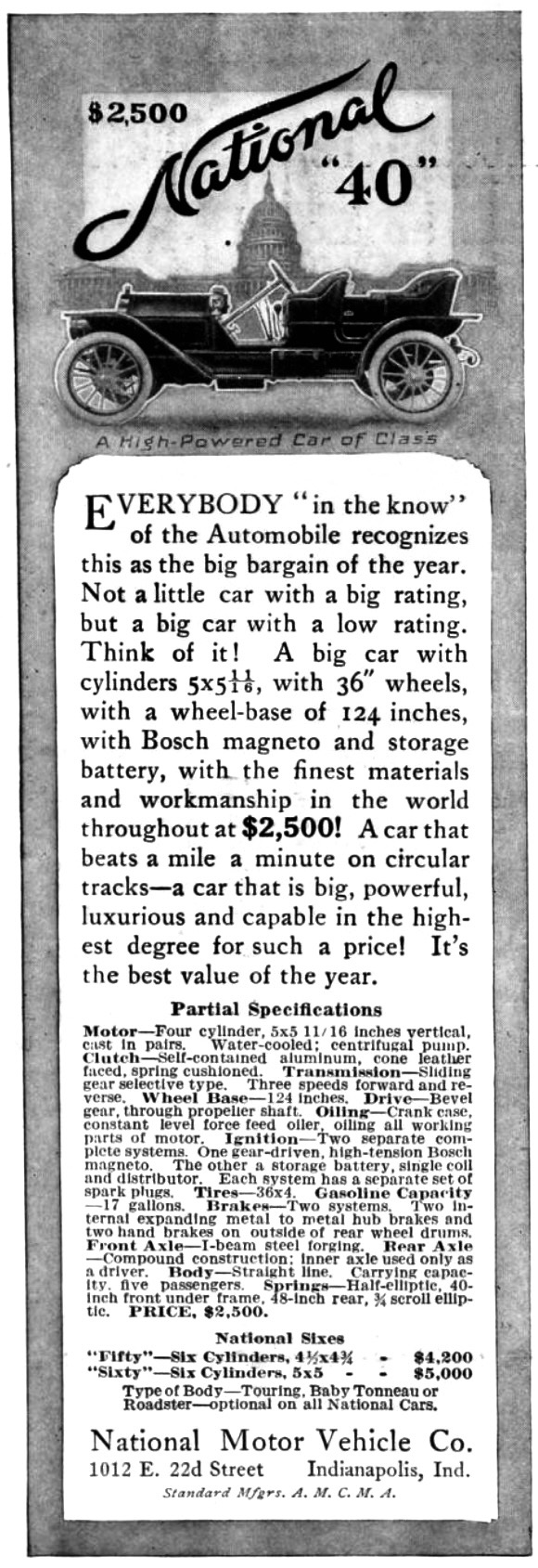
National Model 40 (1909)

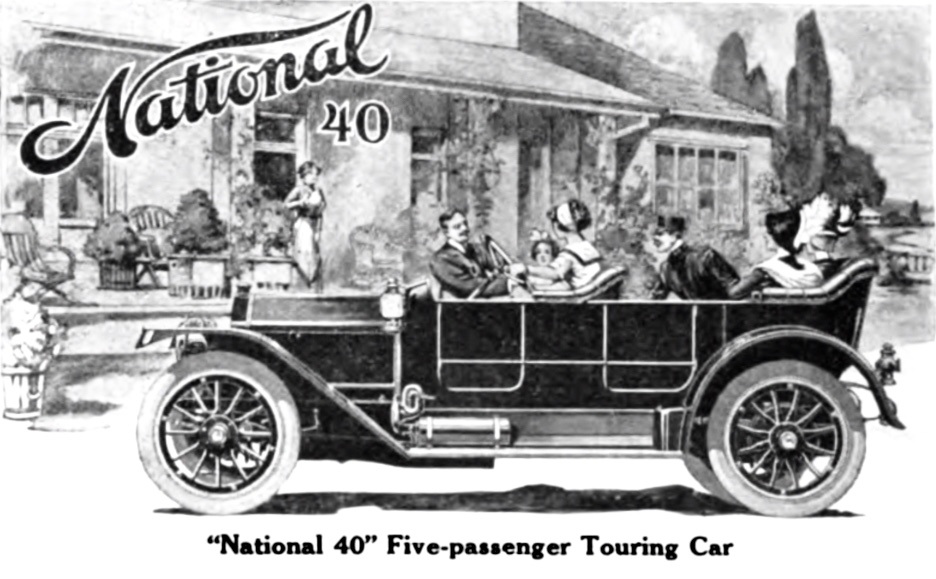
National 40 (1910–1912)

National's first vehicle was the tiller-steered electric runabout Style A in 1900. The single electric motor was situated at the rear of the car, producing 9 hp (6.7 kW). A 4-speed herring bone transmission was fitted. The reinforced wood-framed car could reach 15 mph (24 km/h). In 1903, the company began producing internal combustion-engined cars with four-cylinder engines made by Rutenber. Electric cars were dropped from production in 1905.

For 1905, a circular radiator became a styling signature of the National brand. National introduced one of the first six-cylinder engines in the 1906 model range, which remained available until the breakup of the company.

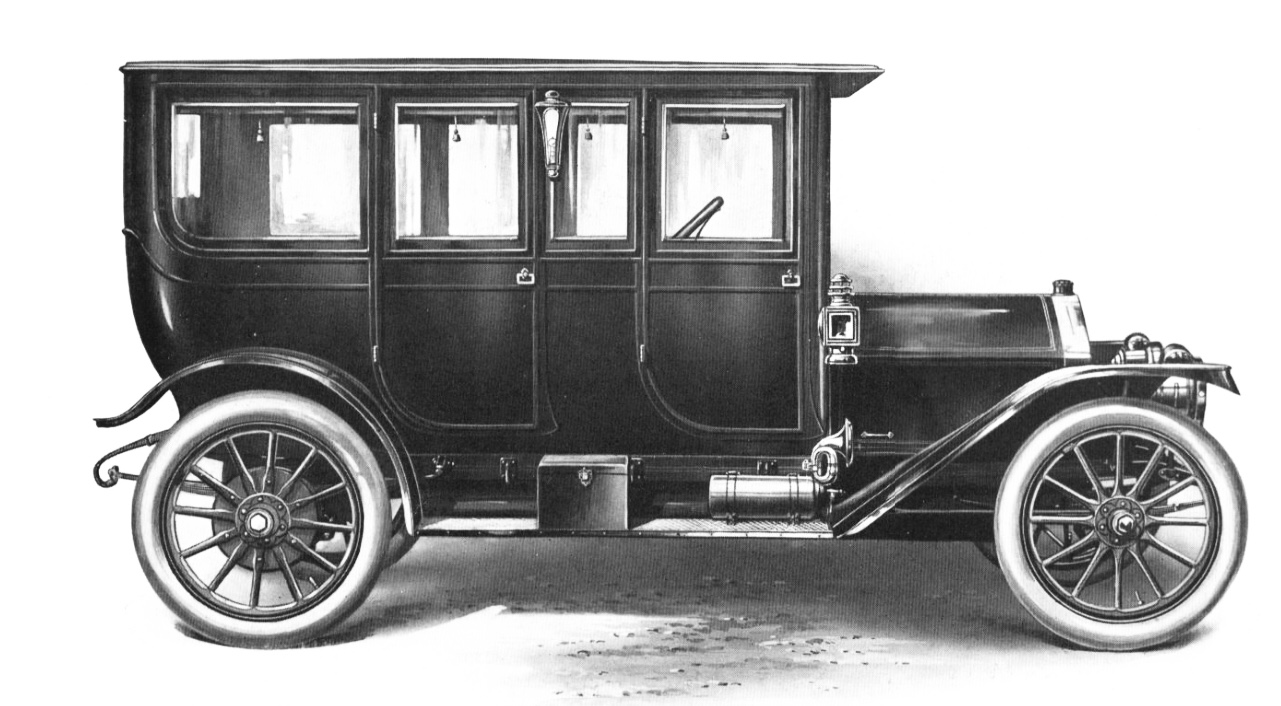
National 40 Seven Passenger Limousine (1910–1912)

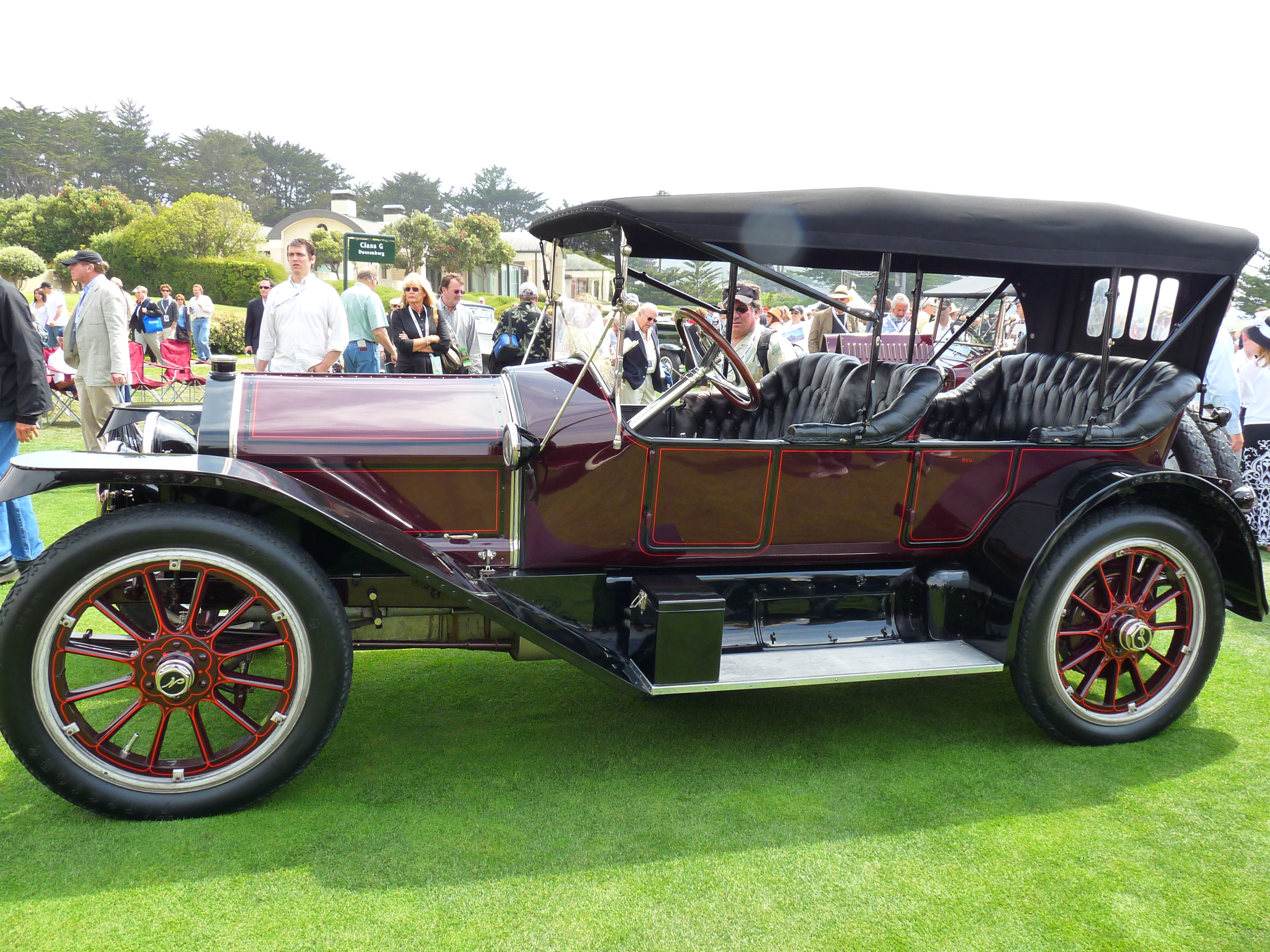
1913 National Series V-N3 Tonneau

Peak production for National was reached in 1915, with over 1,800 cars produced. For 1916, the company introduced the Highway Twelve, a 12-cylinder engine of the company's own design (costing over $1,900) and changed its name to National Motor and Vehicle Corporation. Curiously, the 6-cylinder engine option was priced higher than the 12-cylinder, perhaps because National outsourced the 6-cylinder to Continental under the "Continental Red Seal" moniker.

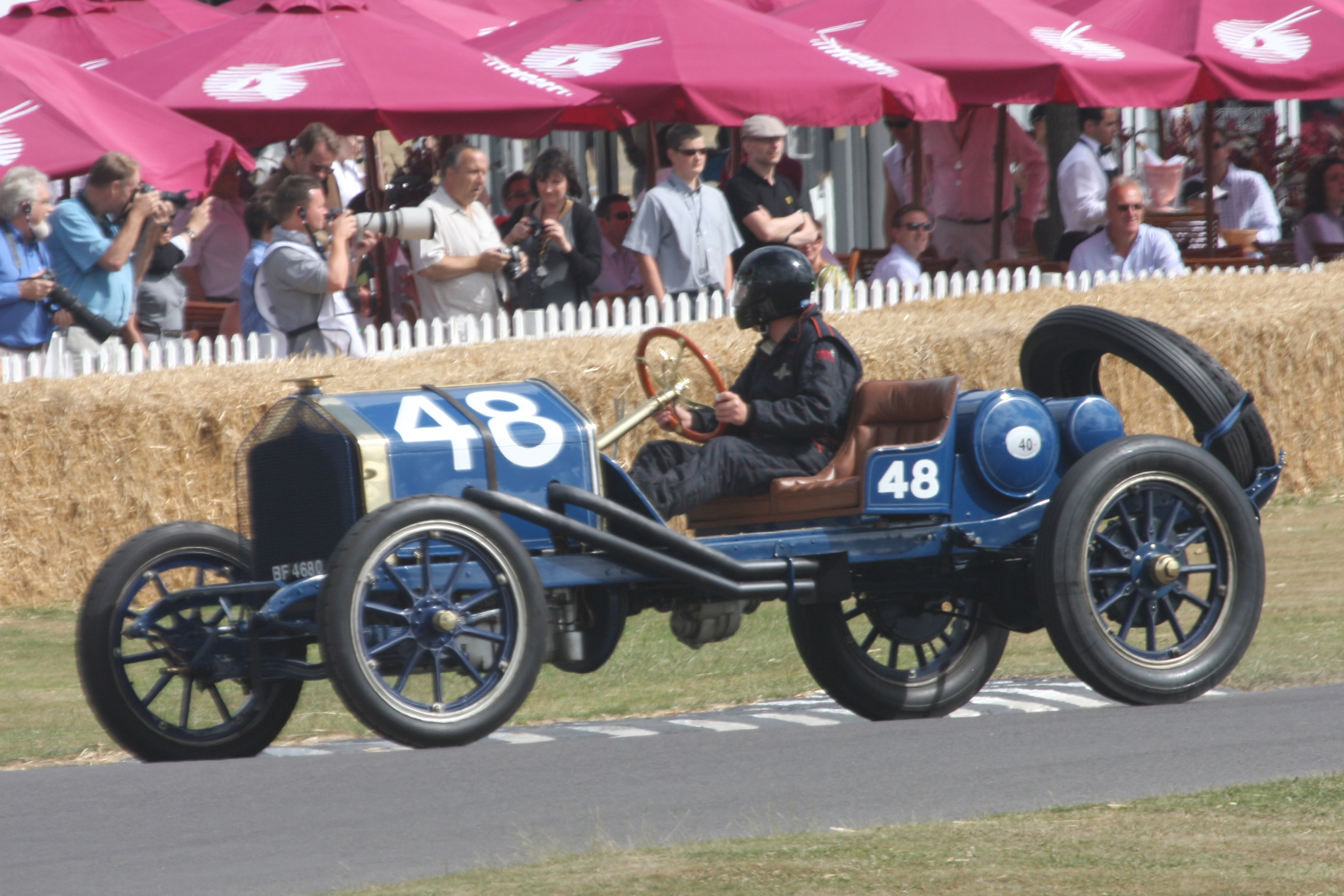
1910 National 40 Indianapolis at the 2009 Goodwood Festival of Speed.

Forced to raise their asking prices to counteract the effects of wartime inflation, National ended up in a higher price range in which they could not compete. For 1920, National dropped their Highway Sixes and Twelves and issued a new model – the Sextet. The Sextet used a Continental side-valve six-cylinder, modified by National engineers with an overhead valve head.

=== Merger ===
The company was merged to form Associated Motor Industries in 1922 along with Dixie Flyer and Jackson. Associated was renamed the National Motors Corporation in 1923, and few cars were made until the company ceased production in 1924.

=== Sporting success ===
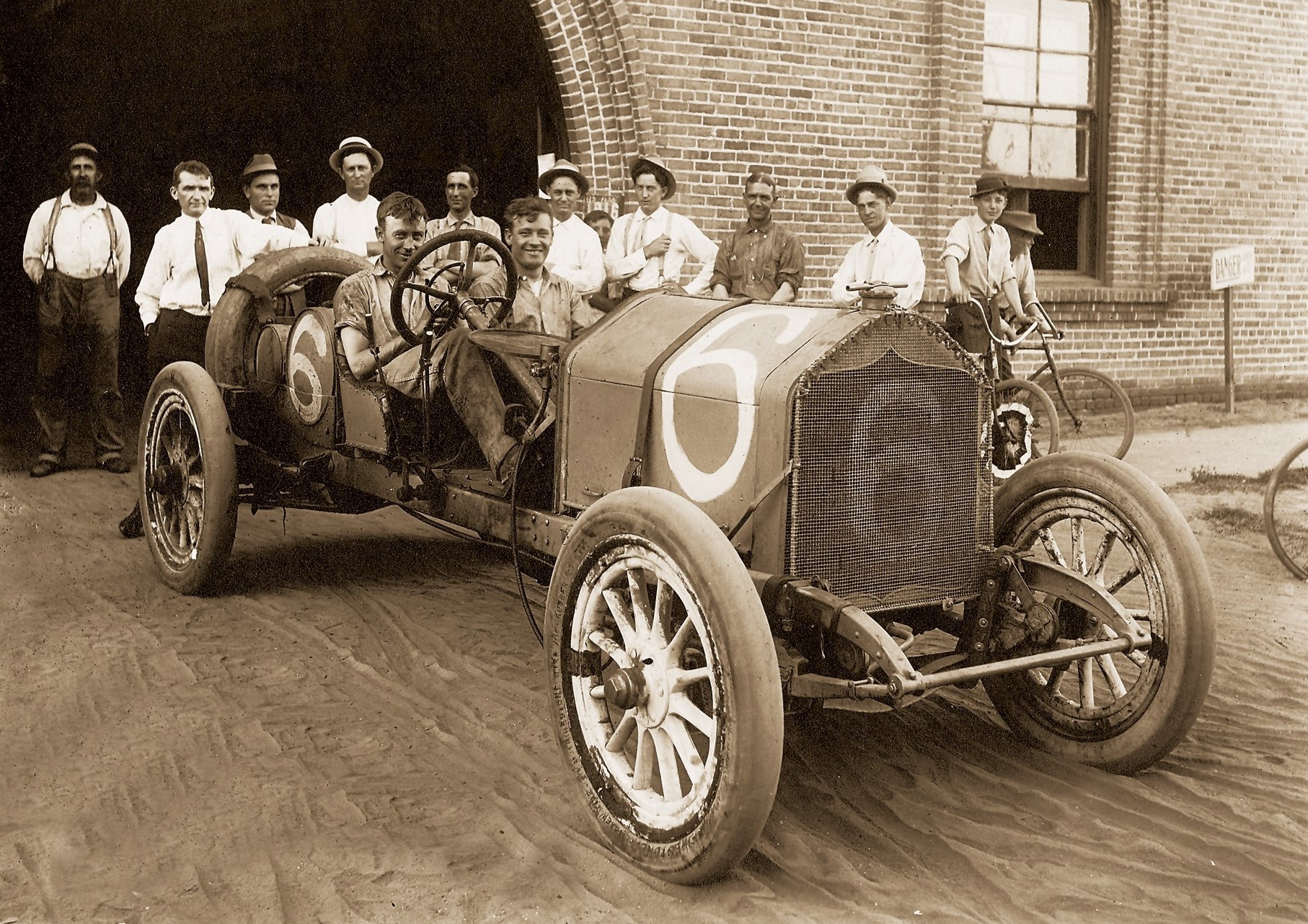
Harvey Herrick and his mechanician in Bakersfield, California, after winning the 1911 Tevis Cup

National had the most enviable and successful career of all of the American pre-World War I race cars. For instance, in 1911, in a combination of road races, speedway races, hill climbs and dirt track races, they won a total of 84 times, came in second 48 times and third 30 times.

The Elgin National Road Races as well as the Illinois Trophy was won by a National 6-cylinder in 1911. In 1912, Joe Dawson won the Indianapolis 500 in a National with an average speed of 78.7 mph. This was the first and only time a stock car ever won the Indianapolis 500.

== Production ==
Year	Production according to Seltzer, Lawrence H.
1911	~ 1,700
1912	~ 1,400
1913	~ 1,700
1914	1,000
1915	1,500
1916	2,500
1917	4,000
1918	1,200
1919	1,600
1920	1,800
1921	600
1922	340
1923	170
Sum	23,558

== Advertisements ==
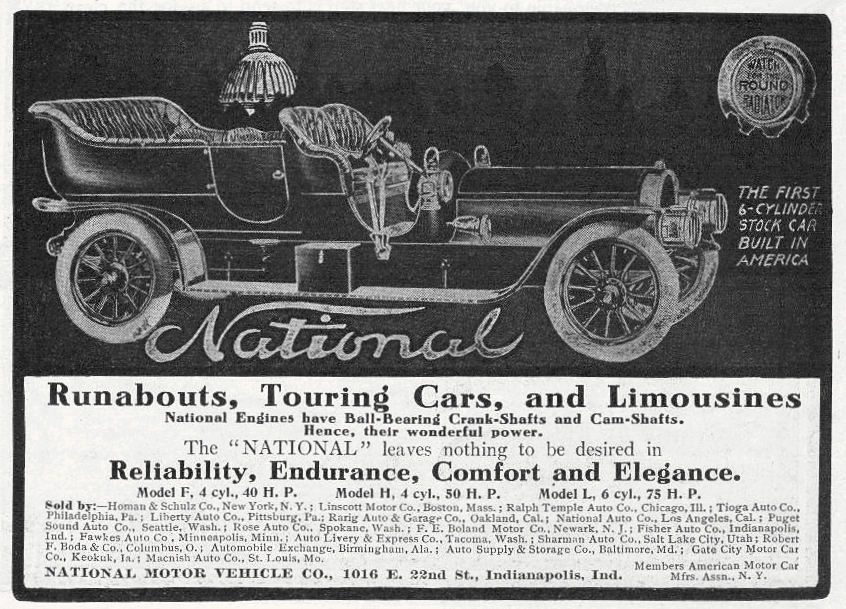
National Six - 1907.

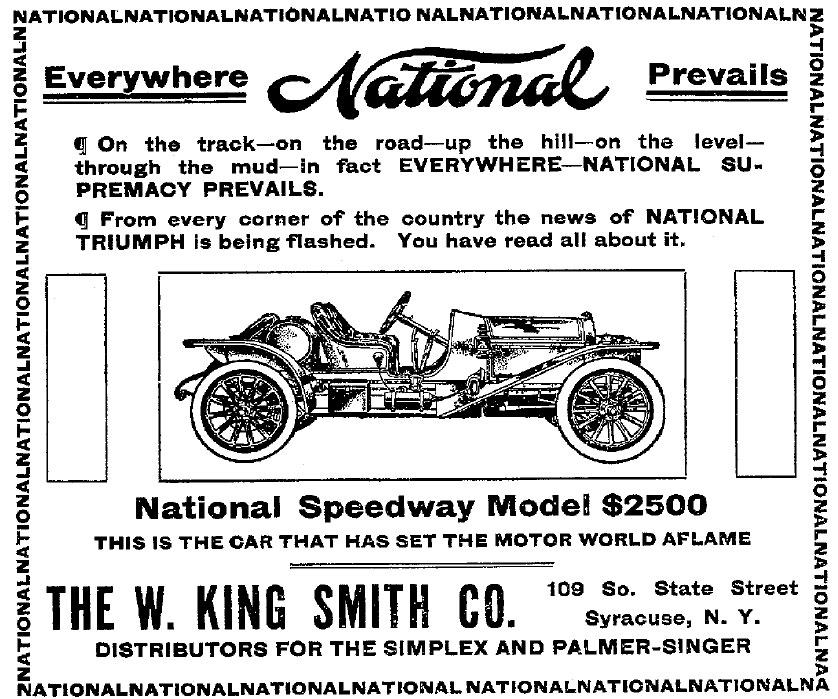
A 1910 National Automobile Advertisement - Syracuse Post-Standard, June 11, 1910

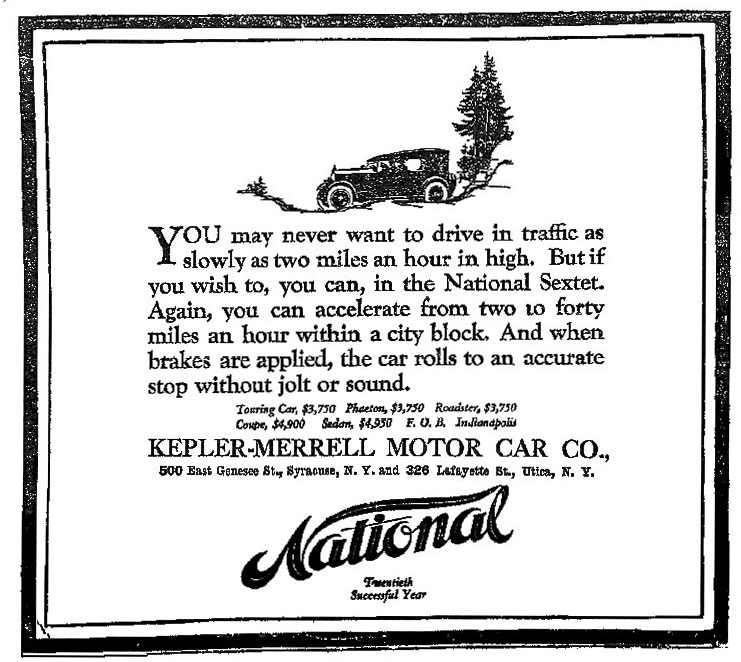
A 1920 National Automobile Advertisement - The Syracuse Herald, July 18, 1910

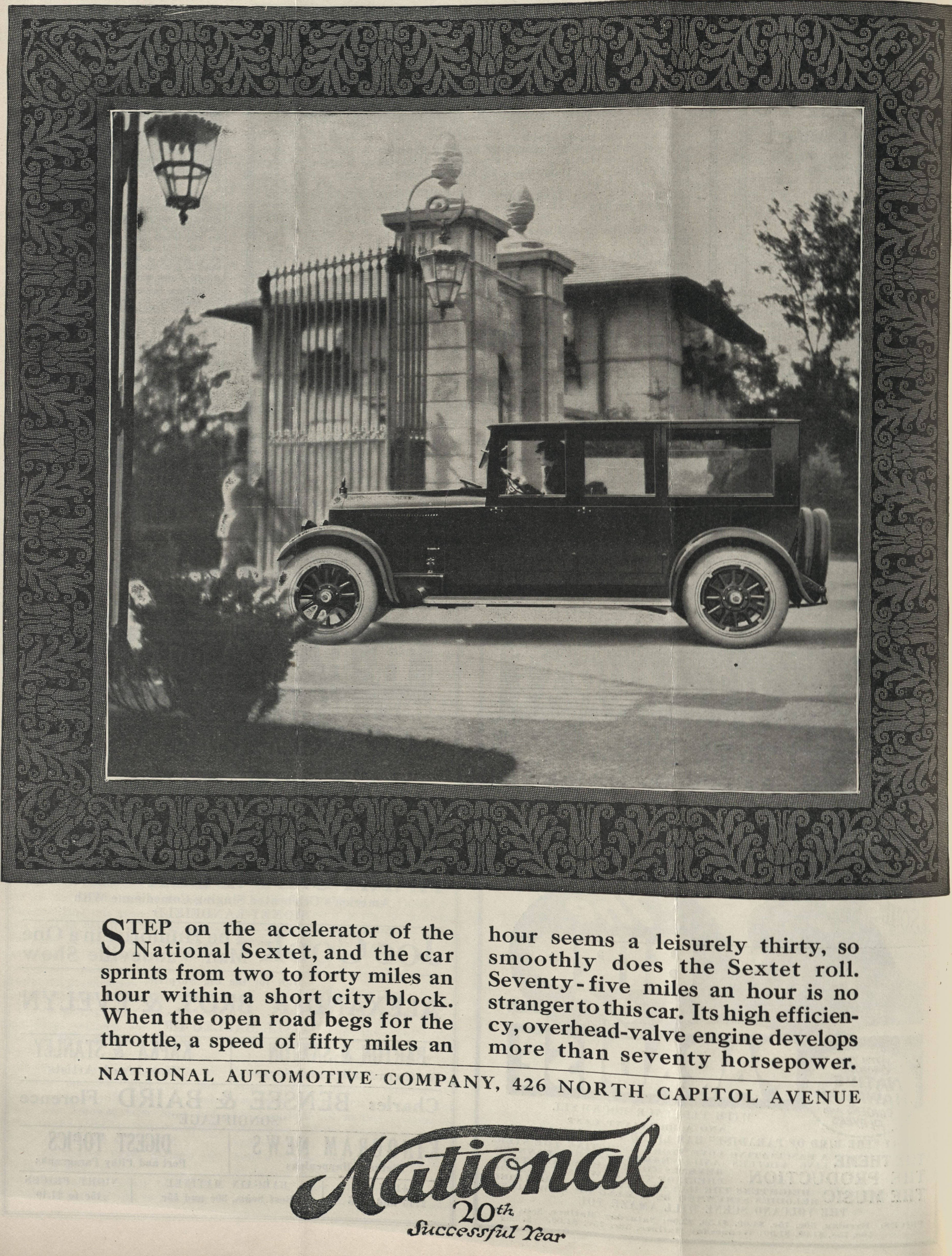
A 1920 advertisement in Topics magazine, October 20, 1920.

== See also ==
- List of automobile manufacturers
- List of defunct automobile manufacturers

== Sources ==
- Frank Leslie's Popular Monthly (January, 1904)
- Clymer, Floyd. Treasury of Early American Automobiles, 1877-1925. New York: Bonanza Books, 1950.
