= Jackson Automobile Company =

Former US automobile manufacturer

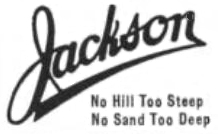
- Industry: Automotive
- Founded: 1903; 123 years ago
- Founder: Byron J. Carter, George A. Matthews, Charles Lewis
- Defunct: 1923; 103 years ago
- Headquarters: Jackson, Michigan, United States
- Products: Vehicles; Automotive parts

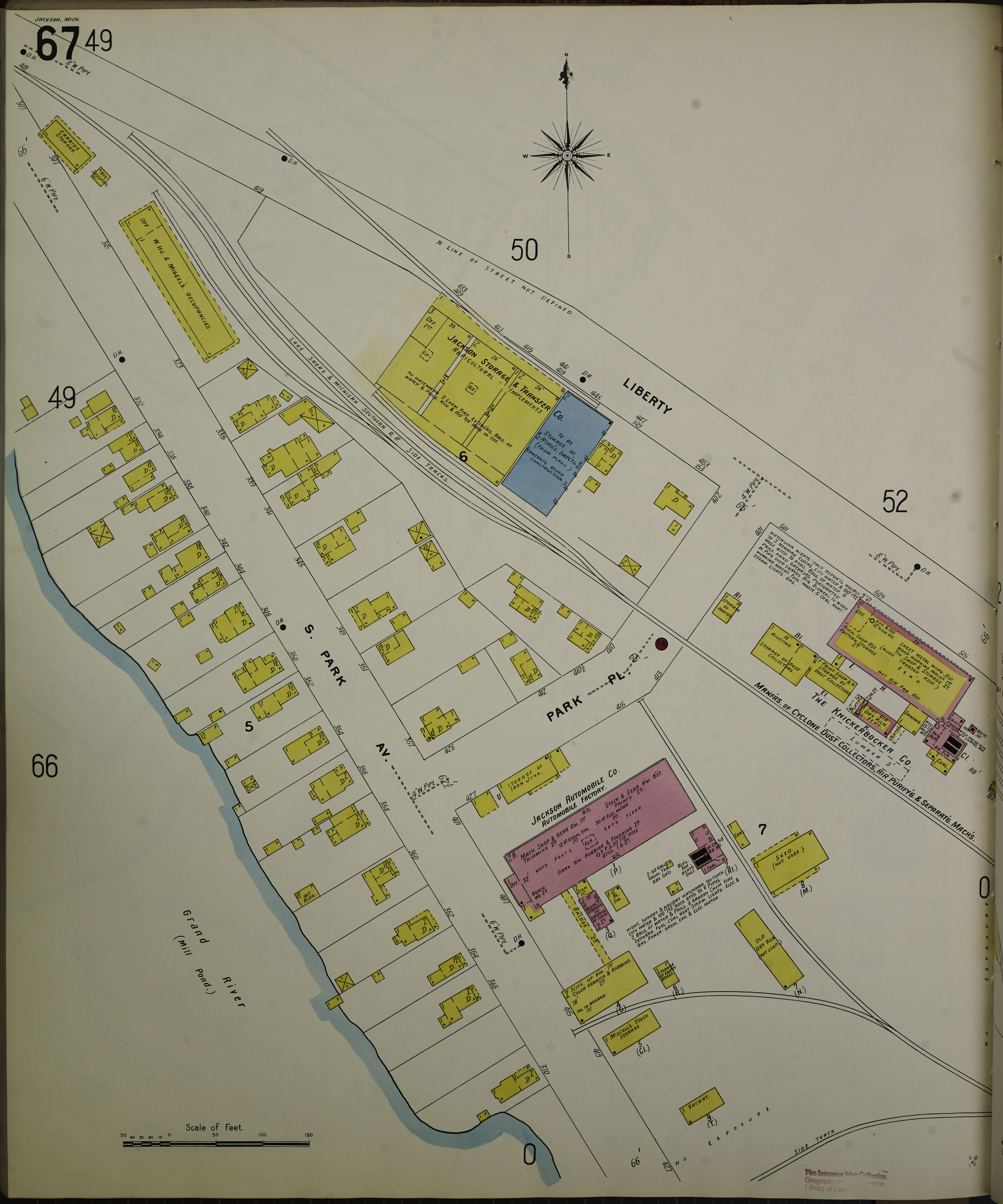
Jackson Plant (1907)

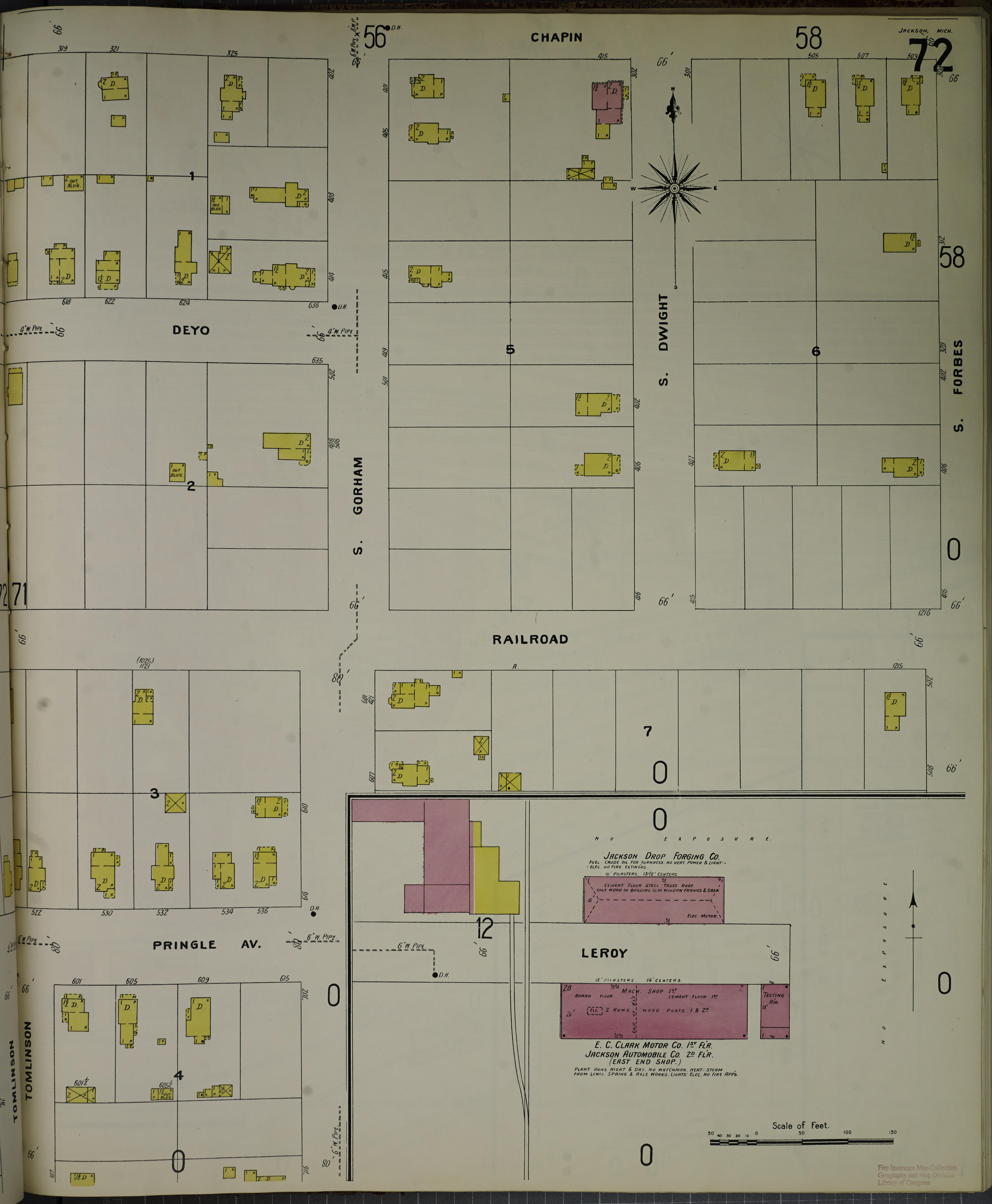
Jackson East End Shop 2. Floor (1907)

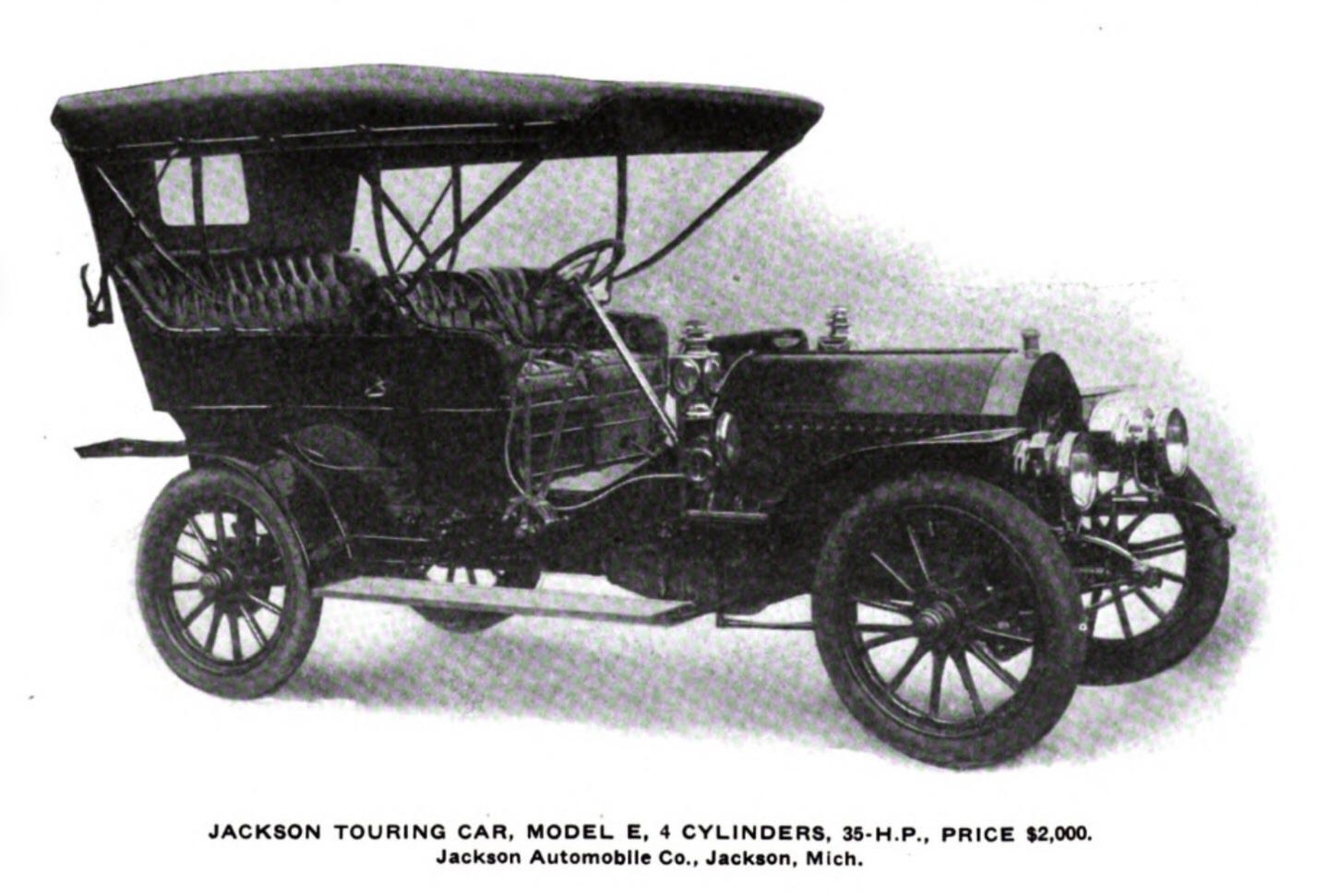
Jackson Model E (1908-1909)

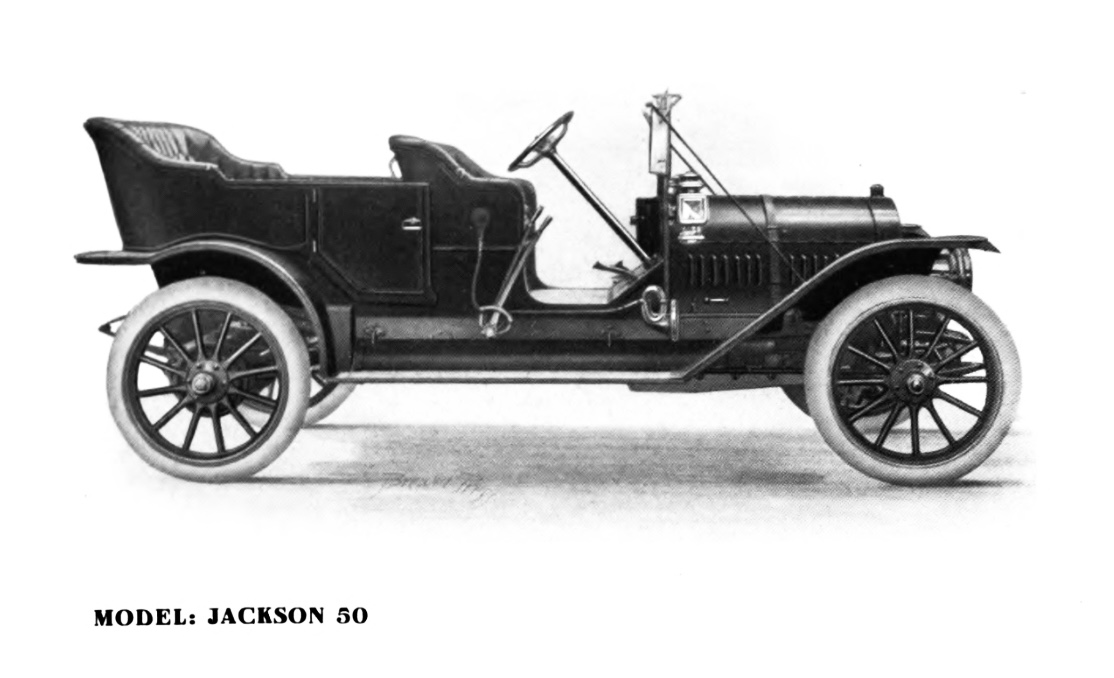
Jackson Model 50 (1910)

The Jackson Automobile Company was an American Brass Era automobile manufacturer located in and named for Jackson, Michigan. The company produced the Jackson from 1903 to 1923, the 1903 Jaxon steam car and the 1904 Orlo.

== Company History ==
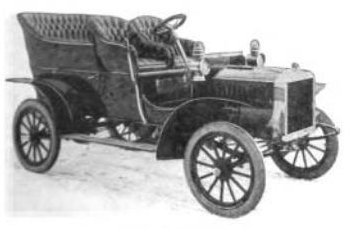
1905 Jackson Model C

Byron J. Carter operated a steam driven press and was a rubber stamp manufacturer. In 1894 Carter went into a partnership with his father selling bicycles. By 1899 he built his first gasoline automobile but focused on steam cars. By 1901 his steam car was being manufactured by the Michigan Automobile Company in Kalamazoo. A year later, Carter returned to Jackson after inventing and patenting a three-cylinder six-horsepower steam engine. Carter partnered with George A. Matthews, a buggy manufacturer and Charles Lewis, president of the Lewis Spring Axle Company, and the Jackson Automobile Company was incorporated in 1903.

== Jackson ==
Full production started in 1903 with a single-cylinder engine car that closely resembled the Oldsmobile Curved Dash. The cylinder count in the engines doubled the next year, and doubled again in 1906. Not long after full production started, Carter left the firm to create the Cartercar. He left due to a disagreement with his partners, who did not wish to use the friction drive transmission he had developed. After Carter left, Jackson automobiles lacked any distinct feature, but they were well-built and long-lasting. In 1910, Matthews bought out Lewis, leaving him as the sole remaining partner. Lewis left to start the Hollier car. Matthews installed his sons in the president, secretary and treasurer positions within the company.

The engines used by the company continued to grow, with a Northway six-cylinder engine becoming available in 1913, and a Ferro V8 available in 1916. Later cars resembled the contemporary Rolls-Royce. Indeed, the company used the phrase "The Car with the Keystone Radiator" in advertisements.

Jackson also produced their own engines with valves in the cylinder heads and overhead camshaft. By 1912 larger vehicles used a multiple metal disc type clutch running in an oil bath, with the smaller horsepower cars using the more standard leather faced cone clutches.

The 1921 Princess Coupe was a hit at the Chicago Auto Show, but obtaining credit was difficult during that year's recession.

== Production models ==
- Jackson Model 50

== Jaxon ==
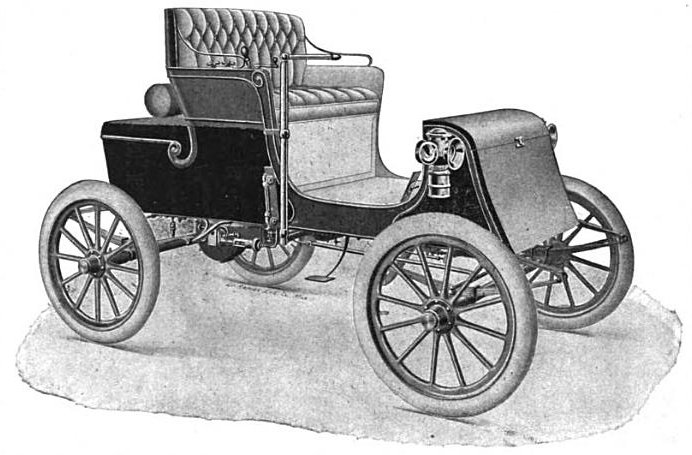
1903 Jaxon Steam Car

Carter further developed his automobile, eventually patenting a 3-cylinder steam engine of 6 horsepower. This became the basis of the 1903 Jaxon automobile. All Jaxons were steam-powered, with the Jackson name reserved for the gasoline-powered cars. There were two models on offer: the $975 Model A riding on a 72" wheelbase, and the $800 Model B on a 7" shorter wheelbase. Production lasted 1 year.

Advertisements proclaimed that "steam is reliable and easily understood".

== Orlo ==
The Orlo was built only in 1904. The Orlo was a five-seat side-entrance model that was equipped with a 16/17 hp two-cylinder engine. The engine was located under the front seat and the drive was through a chain drive. The engine was water-cooled by a finned-coil mounted beneath the front of the bonnet. The Orlo cost $1,125.

== Duck ==
There is some debate over whether this is actually a different marque of automobile produced by the company or just a Jackson model. It was also referred to as the Jackson Back Seat Steer. This gives new meaning to the term "back seat driver" because this is the actual location of the steering controls. The company probably introduced the car to see if having a car with the passengers seated in the front seat would be a winning sales proposition. Since this car was only around in 1913, it is not likely that there were many purchasers.

== Racing ==
Jackson did well in racing and won the Wheeler-Schebler Trophy Race which was held at the Indianapolis Motor Speedway before the first Indianapolis 500. The first race held in 1909 was originally scheduled for 300 miles but was ended at 235 miles because of the deteriorating track conditions. Out of 19 starters only five remained at the end of 200 miles and when the race was stopped, Jackson had a lead of more than two miles ahead of its nearest competitor. In 1910 the Wheeler-Schebler Trophy Race was again held at the Indianapolis Motor Speedway. The winner was a specially designed six cylinder car built exclusively for racing and the Jackson stock model finishing second.

The first Indianapolis 500 was held in 1911 and 46 cars entered. 25 of which had larger end engines than the Jackson entry. The four cylinder 559 cubic inch engine Jackson came in 10th overall beating out 16 cars with larger engines. The Jackson had a top speed of 75 miles an hour and was able to run continuously at this speed stopping only for tires and gas.

== Demise ==
Carter left the company in 1905 because his partners did not wish to pursue his friction drive idea. Carter went on to build the friction drive Cartercar.

During World War I, car production at the firm declined by more than half, since the company was producing materiel for the war effort. For 1919, all production was geared to military supplies. Many Jackson dealers at this time converted to Jordan dealerships. When car production resumed in 1920, the cars apparently were not as good as previously. One assembly line worker said that the company engineer "should have raised chickens instead".

By 1923 the newly formed Associated Motors Industries absorbed the Jackson Automobile Company, Dixie Flyer of Louisville and the National of Indianapolis. Production ceased in 1924.

== Bibliography ==
- G.N. Georgano, Nick (Ed.). "The Beaulieu Encyclopedia of the Automobile". Chicago: Fitzroy Dearborn, 2000. ISBN 1-57958-293-1
- Kimes, Beverly Rae and Clark Jr, Henry Austin. "Standard Catalog of American Cars: 1805-1942" (Third Edition). Iola, WI: Krause. 1996. ISBN 0-87341-428-4
