= William Bourque =

Canadian racing driver (1879–1909)

- Born: Wilfred A. Bourque; March 30, 1879 West Farnham, Québec, Canada
- Died: August 19, 1909 (aged 30) Indianapolis, Indiana, U.S.

Champ Car career
- 2 races run over 1 year
- First race: 1909 Cobe Trophy (Crown Point)
- Last race: 1909 Prest-O-Lite Trophy (Indianapolis)
Wins	Podiums	Poles
0	1	0

Wilfred A. "William" Bourque (often known as "Billy", March 30, 1879 – August 19, 1909) was a Canadian racing driver, born in West Farnham, Québec. At the time of his racing career, he lived in West Springfield, Massachusetts.

== Racing career ==
Bourque is known to have started at least 35 automobile races, during the years 1907–1909. He drove primarily for the team operated by Massachusetts-based auto maker, Knox. Most of his known race starts were hill climbs. He did, however, earn 2nd place in each of two road course events, the 1908 Garden City Sweepstakes Race (187.68 miles, held in Long Island, New York), and the 1909 Cobe Trophy Race (395.59 miles, held at the Crown Point Road Race Circuit).

On August 19, 1909, Bourque won the third automobile race held at the Indianapolis Motor Speedway (a five-mile race). Later that day, driving car number 3, he was killed in an accident during the feature Prest-O-Lite Trophy Race. Witnesses said Bourque's fatal crash occurred when he looked back after being notified by his riding mechanic, Harry Holcomb, that another car was approaching on lap 58. While glancing back, the car swerved, hit a rut, and flipped over. Bourque sustained a fractured skull and punctured lung, and later died in the hospital, making him the first driver to be killed at Indianapolis. Holcomb was also fatally injured in the crash.

== Sources ==
- Scott, D. Bruce; INDY: Racing Before the 500; Indiana Reflections; 2005; ISBN 0-9766149-0-1
- Galpin, Darren; A Record of Motorsport Racing Before World War I.
