= George Robertson (racing driver) =

American racing driver (1884–1955)

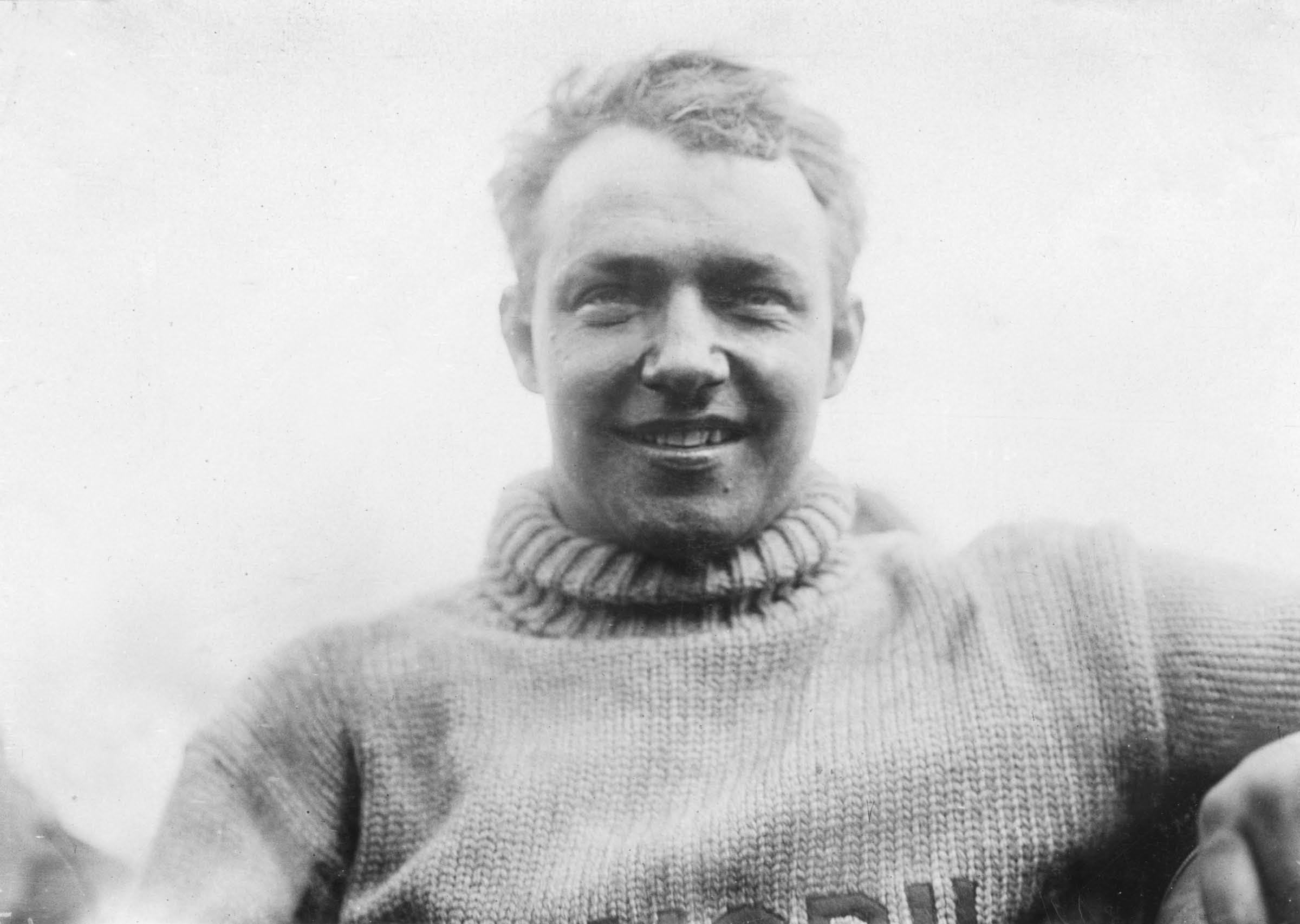
- Robertson after his 1908 Vanderbilt Cup win
- Born: George Hepburn Robertson; November 22, 1884 New York, New York, U.S.
- Died: July 3, 1955 (aged 70) New York, New York, U.S.

Championship titles
- Major victories Vanderbilt Cup (1908)

Champ Car career
- 5 races run over 2 years
- First race: 1909 Indiana Trophy (Crown Point)
- Last race: 1910 Elgin National Trophy (Elgin)
- First win: 1909 Lowell Trophy (Merrimack Valley)
- Last win: 1909 Founder's Week Trophy (Fairmount Park)
Wins	Podiums	Poles
2	4	0

George Hepburn Robertson (November 22, 1884 – July 3, 1955) was an American racing driver. His father ran one of New York's first big garages and Robertson grew up surrounded by Mors, Panhards and other cars.

== Career ==
Robertson raced a Christie, a Hotchkiss, and a Simplex, as well as a Locomobile with which he won the 1908 Vanderbilt Cup. This victory was the first in the Cup by an American driver in an American car, the legendary "Old No. 16".

For the 1910 Vanderbilt Cup, Robertson was the captain of the Benz team but sustained arm injuries in a crash while showing a newspaper reporter the Long Island course and was forced to retire from driving.

In 1921, Robertson served as Duesenberg's team manager in their victory of the French Grand Prix at Le Mans as Jimmy Murphy drove the first American car to win a Grand Prix held in Europe.

Robertson was involved in the construction of Roosevelt Raceway and acted as its manager when the Westbury, Long Island circuit hosted the George Vanderbilt-sponsored Cup in 1936 and 1937.

In 1951, negationist sportswriter Russ Catlin revised AAA records, creating championship results based on all AAA races from 1902 to 1915 and 1917 to 1919. During this process, Catlin changed the 1909 champion from Bert Dingley to George Robertson.

== Death ==
Robertson died in Beth Israel Hospital in New York City on July 3, 1955, aged 70.

== General references ==
- "George Robertson". Vanderbilt Cup Races. Archived from the original on March 3, 2016.
