= Tom Kincade =

American racing driver (1887–1910)

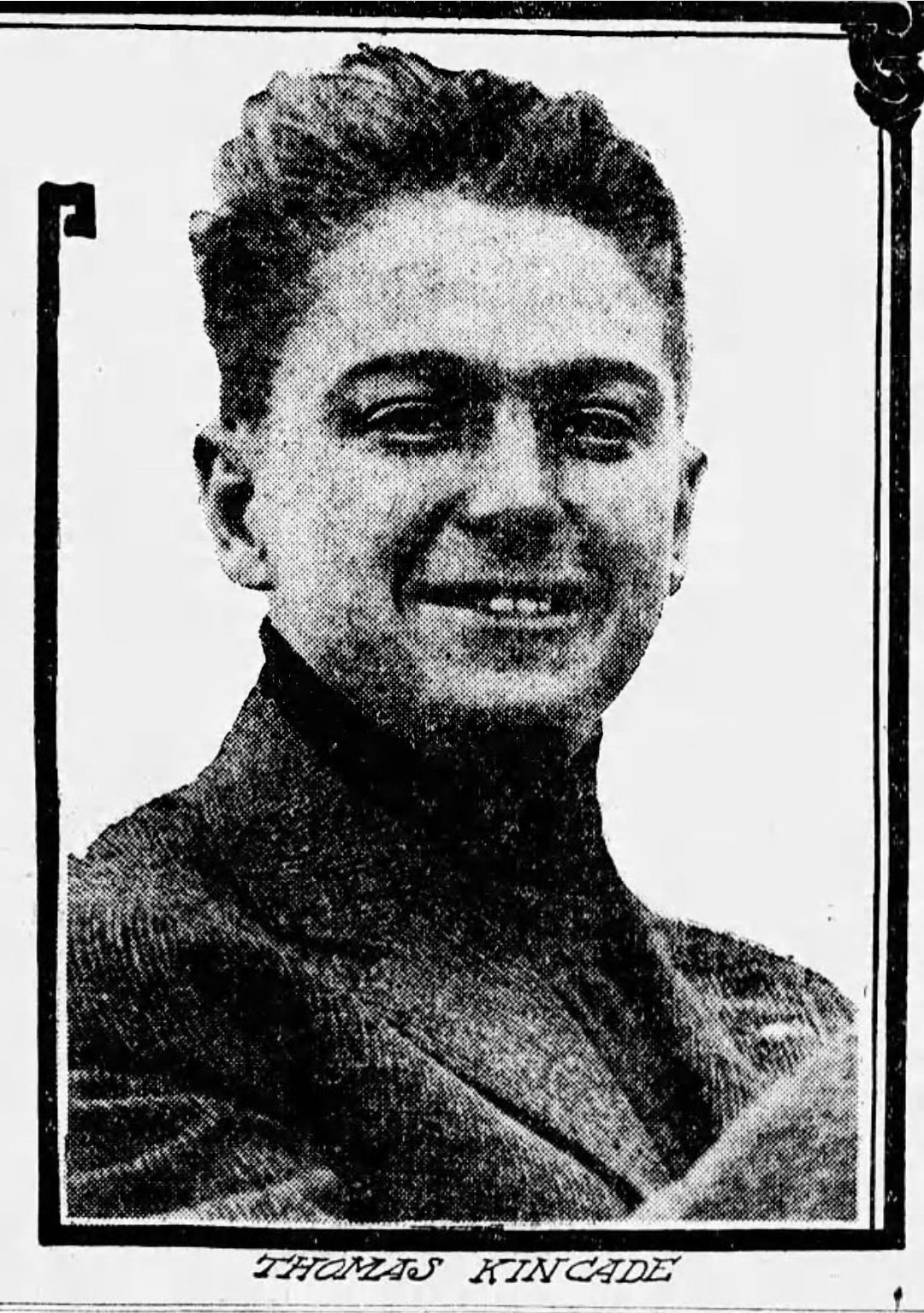
- Kincade, circa 1910
- Born: Thomas A. Kincade; June 28, 1887 Madison County, Indiana, U.S.
- Died: July 6, 1910 (aged 23) Indianapolis, Indiana, U.S.

Champ Car career
- 8 races run over 2 years
- First race: 1909 Prest-O-Lite Trophy (Indianapolis)
- Last race: 1910 Cobe Trophy (Indianapolis)
- First win: 1910 Atlanta Automobile Association; Trophy (Atlanta)
- Last win: 1910 Prest-O-Lite Trophy (Indianapolis)
Wins	Podiums	Poles
2	3	0

Thomas A. Kincade (June 28, 1887 – July 6, 1910) was an American racing driver.

== Racing career ==
Kincade is known to have started at least 23 AAA-sanctioned races, during the years 1909–1910. He drove primarily for the team operated by Indianapolis-based auto maker, National. However, at least one 1910 race result shows him driving a Great Western.

Kincade won a total of three races at the Indianapolis Motor Speedway, including the 100-mile Prest-O-Lite Trophy Race in 1910. His other victories included a 200-mile race at the Atlanta Motordrome the same year.

== Death ==
Kincade was killed in a testing accident at the Indianapolis Motor Speedway on July 6, 1910.

== Sources ==
- Scott, D. Bruce; INDY: Racing Before the 500; Indiana Reflections; 2005; ISBN 0-9766149-0-1.
- Galpin, Darren; A Record of Motorsport Racing Before World War I.
- http://www.motorsport.com/stats
- http://www.champcarstats.com
