= Quinby (automobile) =

19th-century electric vehicle

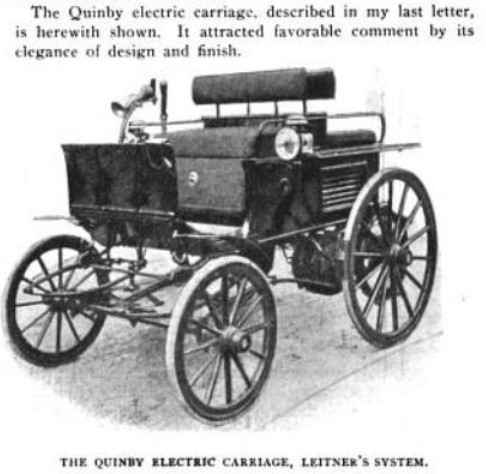
1899 Quinby Electric Carriage from the Horseless Age

The Quinby was an American automobile manufactured in 1899 in Newark, New Jersey.

== History ==
The Horseless Age magazine of March 1899 reported "'It is an unfailing sign of the times, when one of the oldest carriage-building firms in the country, noted for more than half a century for the excellence of their product, embarks in the manufacture of electric carriages.”

J. M. Quinby & Company had been established in Newark in 1834. For a short time, Electric carriages were built to custom order only, though the firm provided a variety of adaptable styles. An electric "on the Leitner system", developed by Henry Moritz Leitner, Electrical Undertakings, Ltd., used two 2½ motors which were geared to the rear wheels. Many of the vehicles appear to have been exported, and the first Quinby Electric was tested in England, where it drove sixty miles without a charge averaging 12½ miles an hour. The battery accumulator system used regenerative braking.

=== Automobile Coachbuilders ===
Shortly after the turn of the century, when the Quinby electric car was discontinued, the firm turned to coach-building for the automotive industry. In 1902, Herbert T. Strong, one of Quinby's designers, patented a process for making composite aluminum over wood for automobile bodies. This innovation helped launch their bodybuilding business. Quinby's annual Importers Salon exhibits consisted of a variety of open and closed body styles on various imported chassis - Benz, Daimler, Decauville, FIAT, Isotta-Fraschini, Lancia, Mercedes, Minerva, Panhard, Renault, and Rolls-Royce. American makes displayed at the New York Auto Show included Simplex, Jennis, Locomobile, Lozier, Matheson, Packard, Pennsylvania, Pierce (Great Arrow), Pierce-Arrow, Scott, Singer, Smith & Mabley and Wick.

In March 1917 Quinby announced its retirement from business.
