= Al Livingston =

American racing driver (1881–1910)

- Born: Albert A. Livingston circa 1881 Tonawanda, New York, U.S.
- Died: November 1, 1910 (aged 28–29) Atlanta, Georgia, U.S.

Champ Car career
- 6 races run over 1 year
- First race: 1910 Illinois Trophy (Elgin)
- Last race: 1910 Vanderbilt Cup (Long Island)
- First win: 1910 Illinois Trophy (Elgin)
Wins	Podiums	Poles
1	5	0

Albert A. Livingston (often seen as Livingstone, c. 1881 – November 1, 1910) was an American racing driver who competed during the formative years of auto racing. He competed in the Vanderbilt Cup in 1910.
