= Simplex Automobile Company =

Defunct American motor vehicle manufacturer

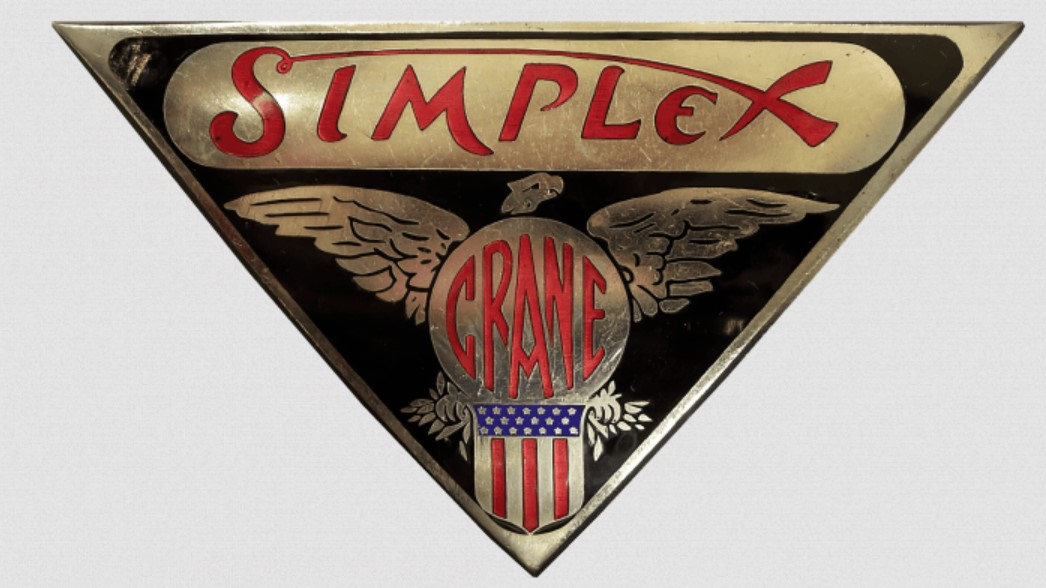
- 1916 Simplex - Crane Model 5 radiator emblem

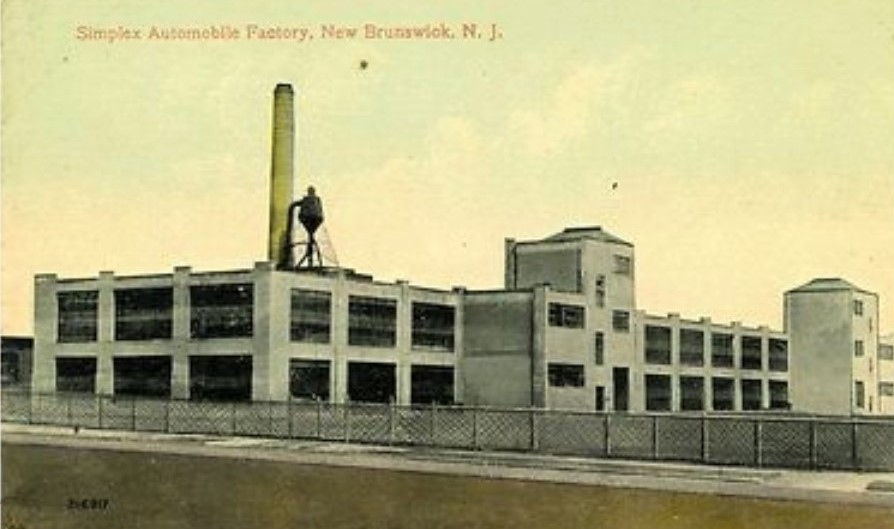
- Simplex Automobile factory in New Brunswick, N.J., opened in 1912
- Formerly: Smith & Mabley Manufacturing Company
- Industry: Automotive
- Founded: 1907; 119 years ago
- Founder: Herman Broesel, Sr.
- Defunct: 1921; 105 years ago
- Fate: assets purchased
- Successor: Crane-Simplex Company
- Headquarters: New York City, New York
- Area served: United States
- Key people: Herman Broesel, Sr. and sons, G. Edward Franquist, Henry M. Crane
- Products: Automobiles
- Production output: 1,865 (1907-1918)

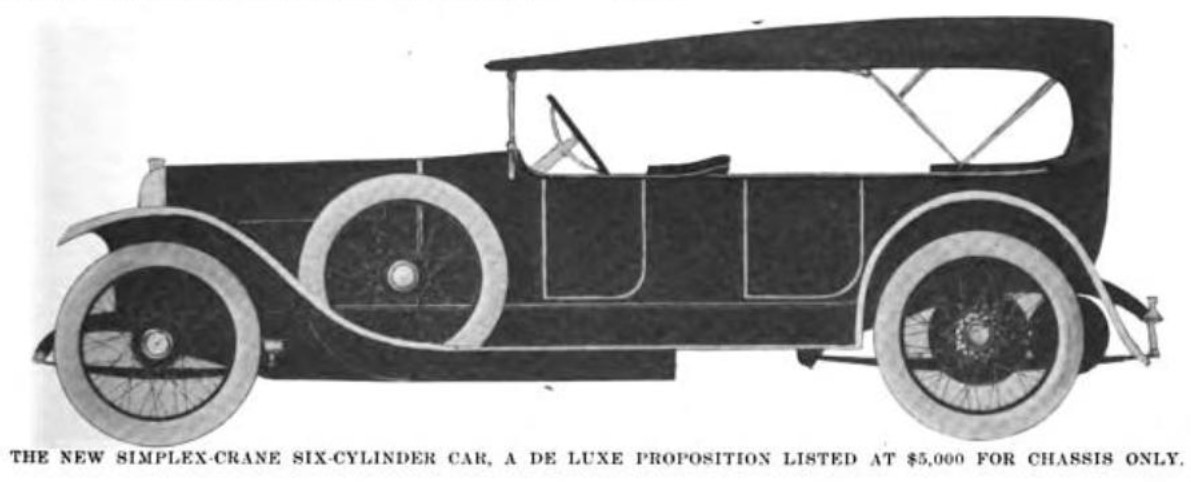
1916 Simplex, Crane Model 5

The Simplex Automobile Company was formed in 1907 to take over the manufacturer of the S & M Simplex. The Simplex was an American luxury Brass Era automobile manufactured from 1907 to 1918. Headquartered with a manufacturing plant in New York City, manufacturing from 1912 was in New Brunswick, New Jersey. The Simplex Crane Model 5 was commonly called Simplex-Crane and Crane-Simplex. The Crane-Simplex Company of Long Island, New York, was an attempt in 1922 to revive the brand but closed after only a few chassis were built.

== History ==
The Smith & Mabley Manufacturing Company of New York City was established by Smith & Mabley, Inc., to manufacturer automobiles in 1904. The S & M Simplex was a luxury car designed by Chief Engineer Gustav Edward Franquist who was influenced by European designs. With an impending bankruptcy, Smith & Mabley, Inc., sold their automobile manufacturing company and plant to their friend Herman Broesel, Sr., in March 1907 Broesel established the Simplex Automobile Company, capital of $2,000, to take over from Smith & Mabley Manufacturing Company and set up a salesroom at 12 West 23rd Street.

=== New York City ===
Textile importer Herman Broesel, Sr., brought on board his sons Herman Broesel, Jr., and Carl Broesel who shared a passion for automobile and motor boat racing. Wilbur C. Whitehead was appointed President. Edward Franquist's services were retained.

In January 1908, it was announced that Palmer & Singer would be the sole selling agents for Simplex Automobiles, and C. M. Hamilton, former Simplex salesman, would be joining the firm. The sales room was located in Palmer & Singer’s new building at 1620 Broadway. J. M Quinby & Company continued to be the main coachbuilder for Simplex. Palmer & Singer introduced their own line of cars with the separate Simplex Model 50 offered at $5,750 (equivalent to $206,042 in 2025), being the leader of their line.

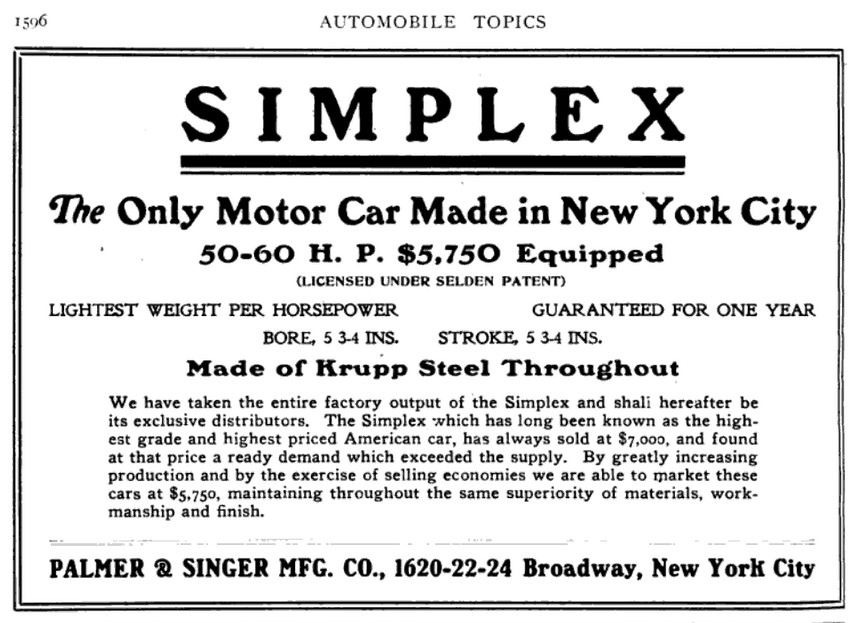
1908 Palmer-Singer advertisement for the Simplex Model 50 in Automobile Topics

For 1909 the Simplex 50hp model remained the main offering. A new, more powerful Simplex was the G. E. Franquist designed 90hp model, that could reach speeds of 90mph. In 1909 American-La France of Elmira, contracted for Simplex 50-hp chassis and engines for their firefighting equipment.

By 1910, the Simplex sales office was located at 1860 Broadway, New York City, and the factory continued to be located at 614 East 83rd Street. Wilbur C. Whitehead retired from the presidency of Simplex Automobile in 1910 to devote his energies to contract bridge.

=== Motor Boats ===
Simplex engines powered the Dixie series motor boats which won the Harmsworth Cup four times between 1907 and 1911. Clinton H. Crane was the designer of the Dixie and Simplex series of motor boats. His brother, Henry M. Crane, was involved with Edward Franquist in engine design. Franquist built motor boat engines up to 8-cylinders but Henry Crane did as well.

=== Motorsport ===
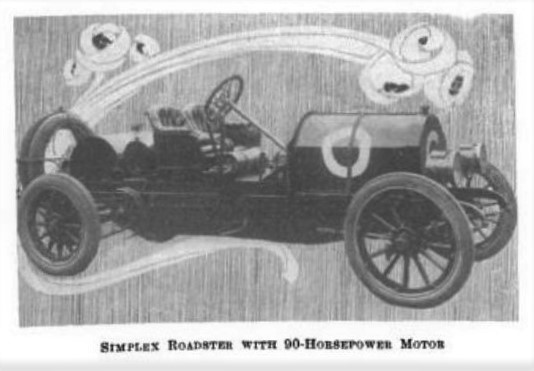
1909 Simplex Model 90 Speed Car in Motor Age magazine

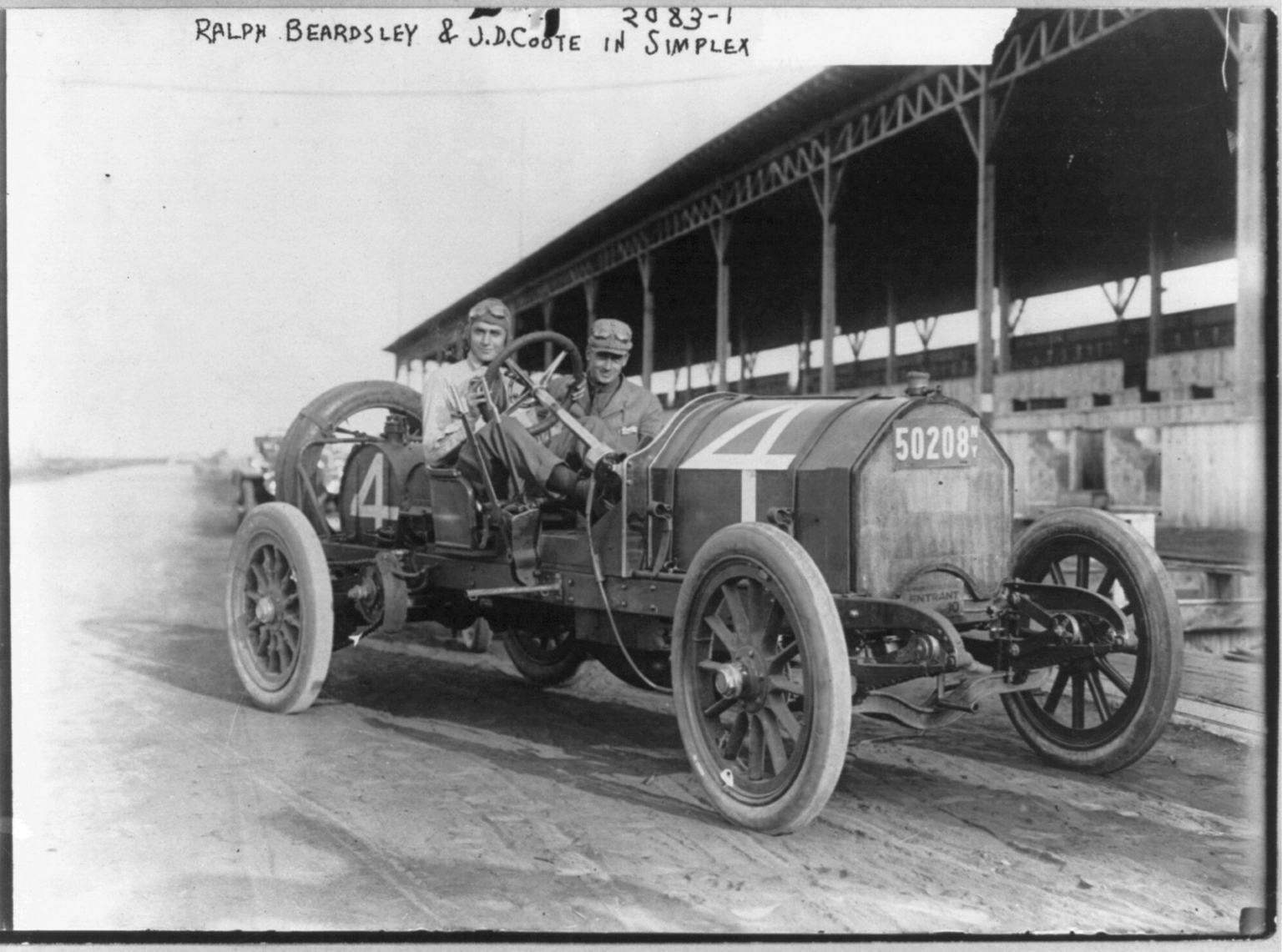
Ralph Beardsley and J.D. Coote in a Simplex 90hp at the 1910 Vanderbilt Cup Race where they placed 7th.

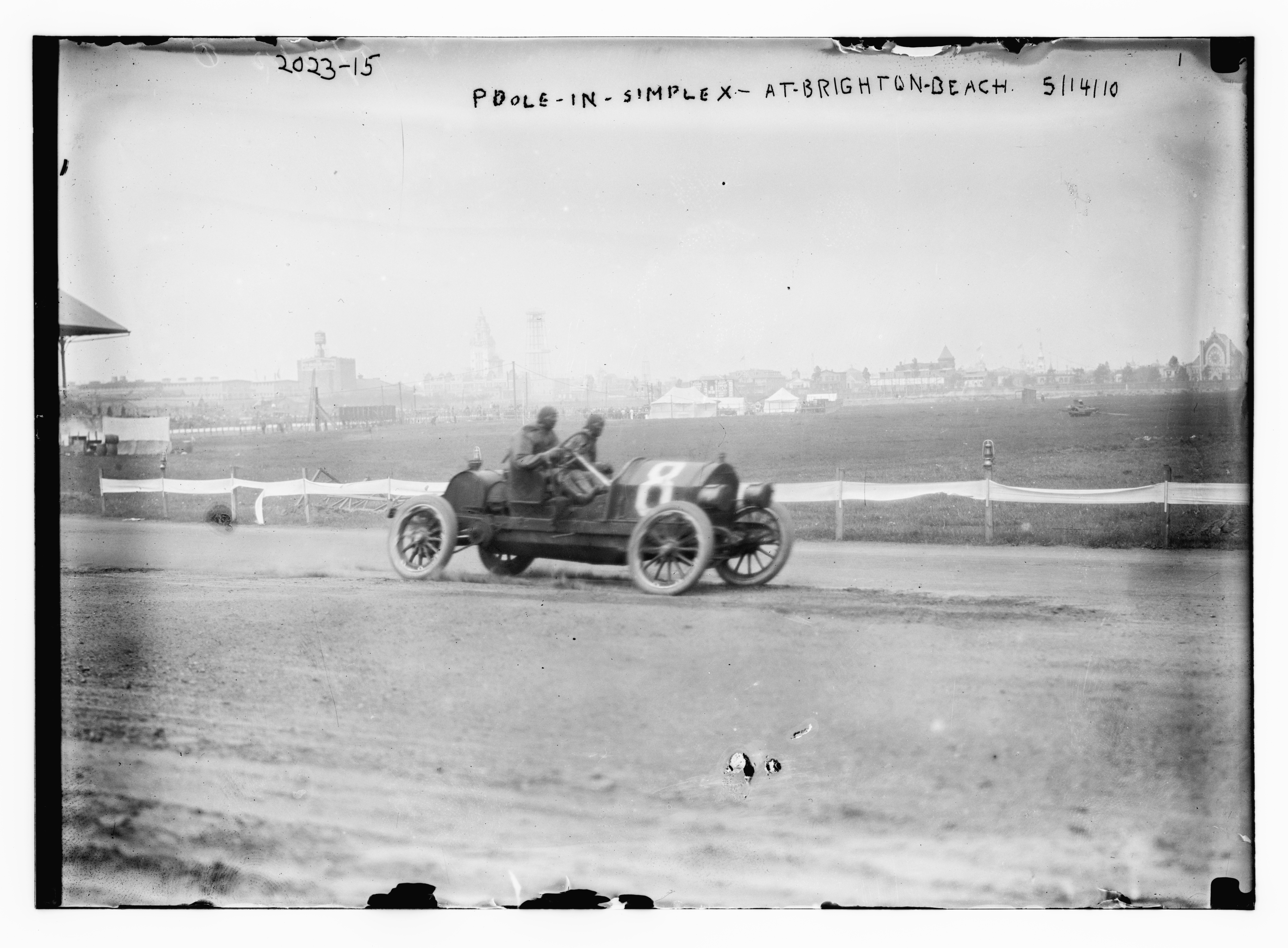
Al Poole in the Simplex 90hp, winner of the Brighton Beach 24 hour Race in 1910

Simplex actively competed in races and hill-climbs usually with top results. Simplex won the 24 Hour Race at Brighton Beach in 1908 with drivers George Robertson and Frank Lescault. In July 1909, Simplex again won the Brighton Beach 24 Hour race with drivers George Robertson and Al Poole. George Robertson won the Fairmount Park race in Philadelphia in 1909 with his 90 h.p. Simplex.

In May 1910 Simplex won the Brighton Beach 24 Hour race for a third time with drivers Al Poole and Charles Basle. At the 1911 Brighton Beach meet, Simplex driver Leonard Ormsby was disqualified after causing a fatal crash. H. Frey in his Mercer died while avoiding Ormsby during an illegal turn in a practice run. Ralph DePalma replaced Ormsby and Simplex placed third in the race. In 1911, Competing in a Simplex 50hp model, Ralph DePalma with his mechanic Charles Bury ran the first Indianapolis 500 race placing Sixth.

By November 1911, Simplex was again running their own sales rooms. Simplex reported it was spending $50,000 annually on their racing program and as an advertising cost had an insufficient return from the 'sporty" class of buyers it attracted. Racing would be curtailed with plans to broaden Simplex's print advertising. Simplex stated that maximum output was limited to about 350 cars a year.

Simplex Model 50 and Model 90 Gallery

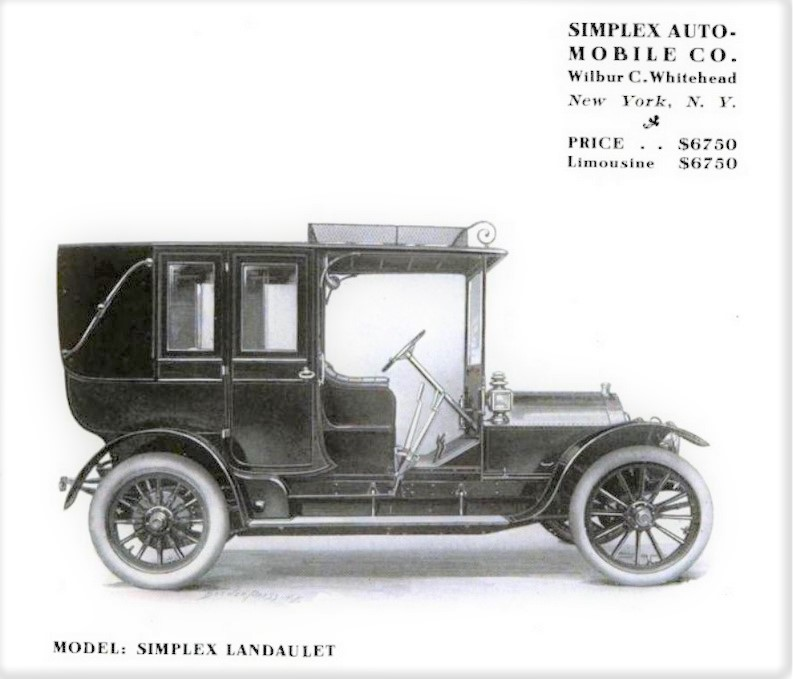
1909 Simplex Model 50 Landaulet

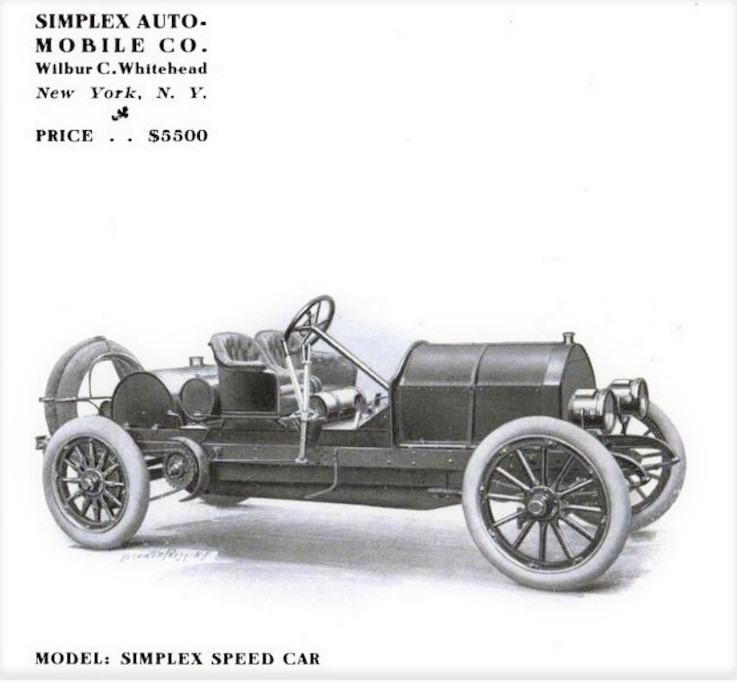
1909 Simplex Model 50 Speed Car

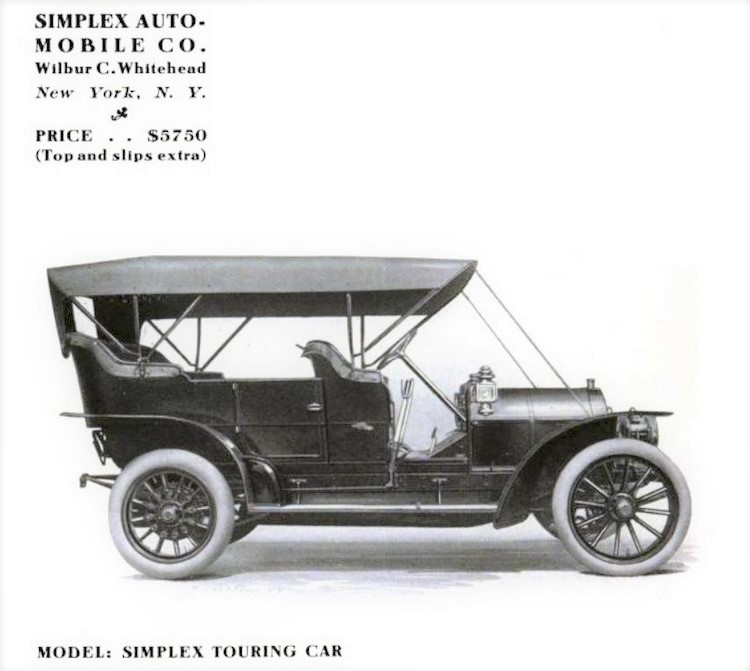
1909 Simplex Model 50 Touring Car

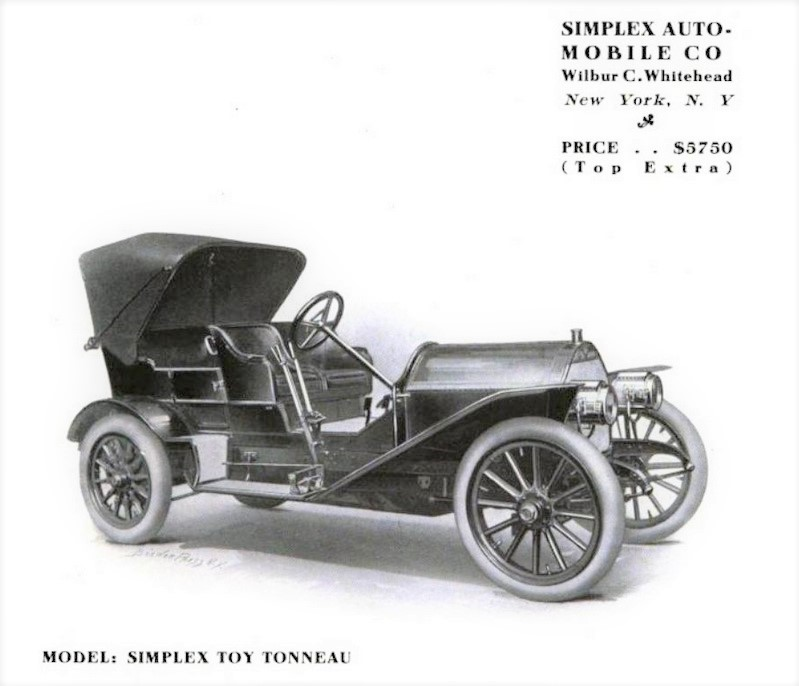
1909 Simplex Model 50 Toy Tonneau

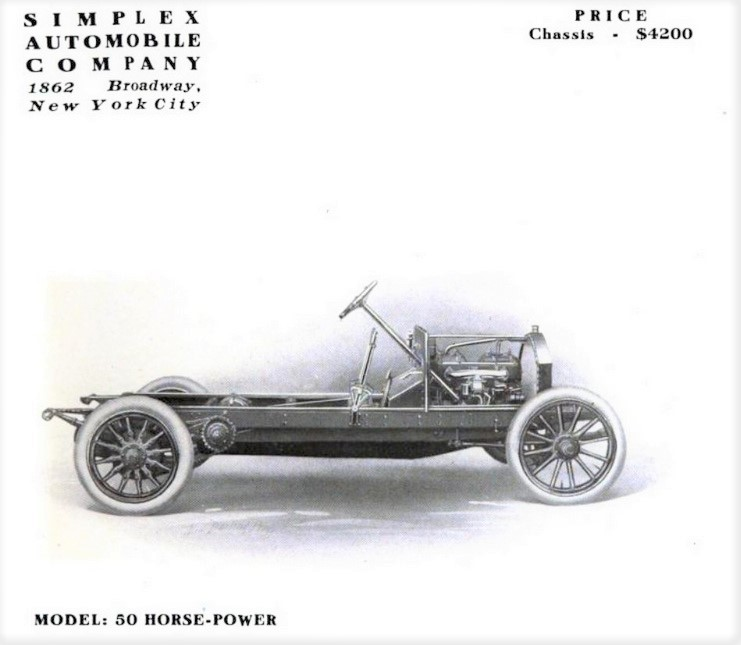
1911 Simplex Model 50 Chassis

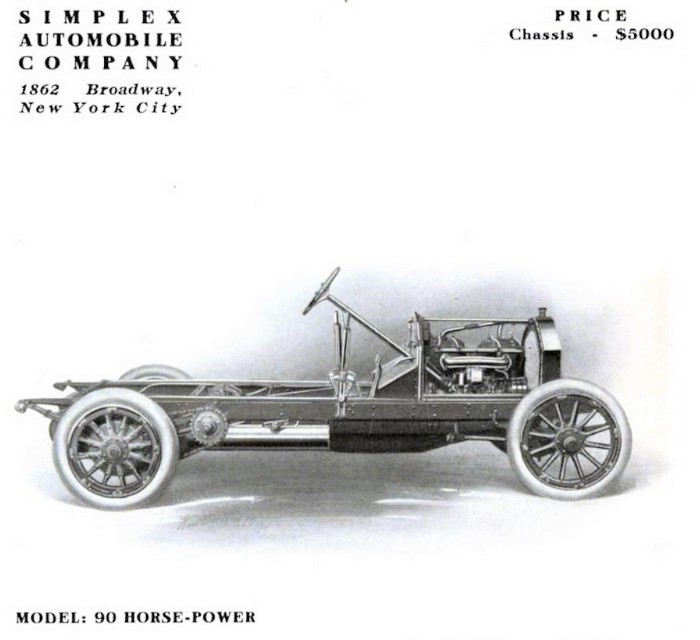
1911 Simplex Model 90 Chassis

=== New Jersey and New York ===
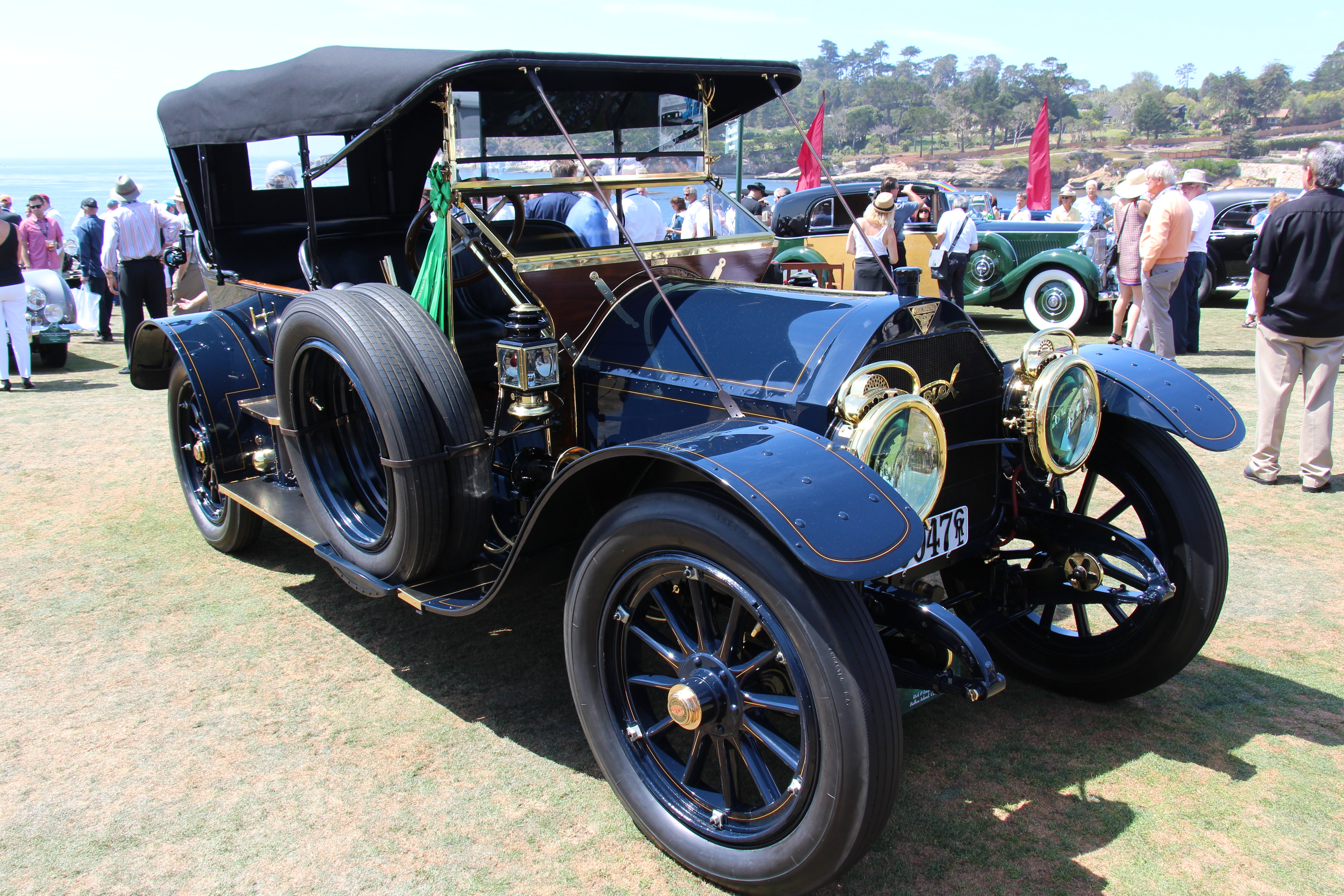
1912 Simplex Model 50 - Quinby Toy Tonneau body

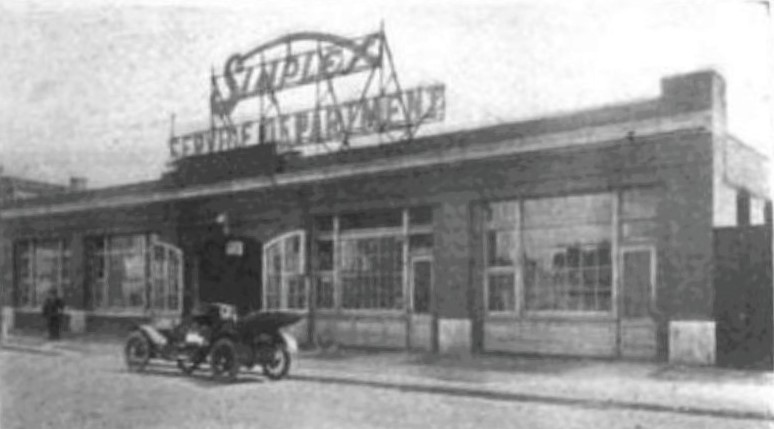
1914 Simplex Service building, Vernon Ave, Long Island City - part of the building is extant

Simplex established a new plant in New Brunswick, New Jersey and moved in on November 15, 1911. With the closing of the New York City factory, a large service department in Long Island City at Vernon Avenue and 12th Street was established. Simplex sales office was now at 59th Street and Central Park, South.

On June 5, 1912 Herman Broesel died and in September 1913 his sons sold the company to Bankers Goodrich, Lockhart and Smith of New York, NY. Henry Lockhart, Jr. became president. John D. Dale, Sales Manager and G. E . Franquist, Factory Superintendent, remained as directors. Herman A. Broesel, Jr. became the manager of the Long Island City Service Department and Carl A. Broesel joined Franquist in New Brunswick. The Simplex Automobile Capital was increased from $1,000,000 to $1,500,000.

=== Simplex, Crane Model 5 ===
The Crane Motor Company of Bayonne, New Jersey, built automobiles from 1912 to 1915. The Crane Model 3 was a six-cylinder car offered only as a chassis. The chassis was priced at $8,000 (equivalent to $260,606 in 2025), the highest priced American chassis on the market. Crane favored Brewster & Co. as a coachbuilder and most Crane automobiles were bodied by that firm. Only about 20 Crane Model 3s were made in 1912 and 1913. By 1914 a Model 4 was produced by Crane. It differed in having the six cylinders cast in two blocks of three instead of three pairs.

This new six cylinder design attracted the attention of the Simplex Automobile Company. The Simplex needed a more refined design than the large chain-drive four-cylinder automobiles it was producing. In July 1915, the Simplex Automobile Company purchased the Crane Motor Company, acquiring at the same time the services of Henry Middlebrook Crane. Henry M. Crane became second vice-president and Chief Engineer. Edward Franquist departed Simplex and in 1918 would become Chief Engineer for James Cunningham, Son and Company for the Cunningham automobile.

The Crane Model 4, became the Simplex, Crane Model 5. From the beginning of the announcement of the Simplex purchase of Crane, The Automobile magazine referred to the new car as Crane-Simplex, only mentioning later in the September 1915 article that it was the Crane model of Simplex The article describes the new six cylinder shaft driven car with 100-hp at 2000-rpm. In the August 1916 Automobile Topics magazine 2- page article, the new cars was described as the "Model 5 Simplex-Crane -- or plain Simplex". Although never official, the Simplex Crane Model 5 would often be referred to as the Crane-Simplex.

Bodies were built by a variety of coachbuilders including Brewster, Healey, Holbrook, Stone and Demarest in addition to their own Simplex bodies. The chassis was guaranteed for life in the hands of the original owner.

Simplex Crane Model 5 Gallery

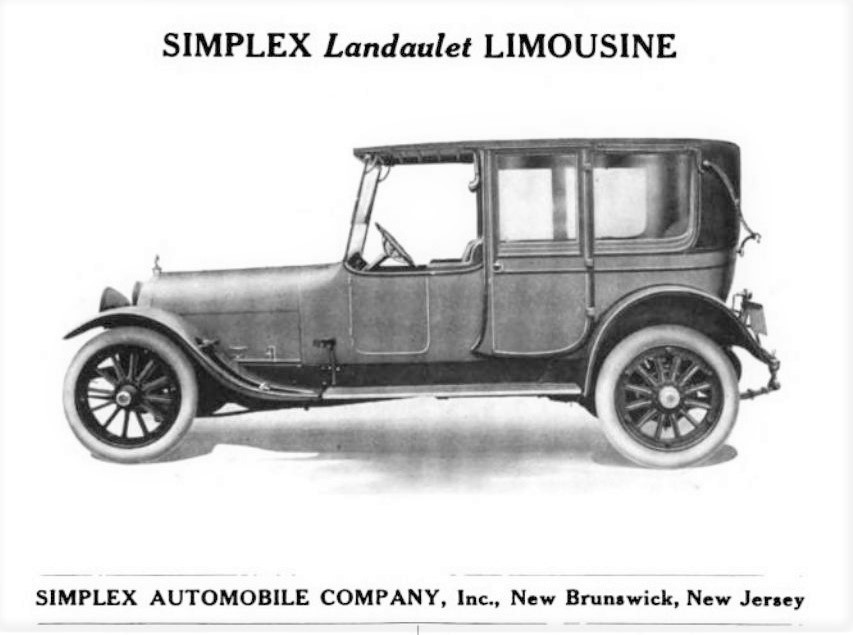
1916 Simplex Crane Model 5 - Landaulet Limousine

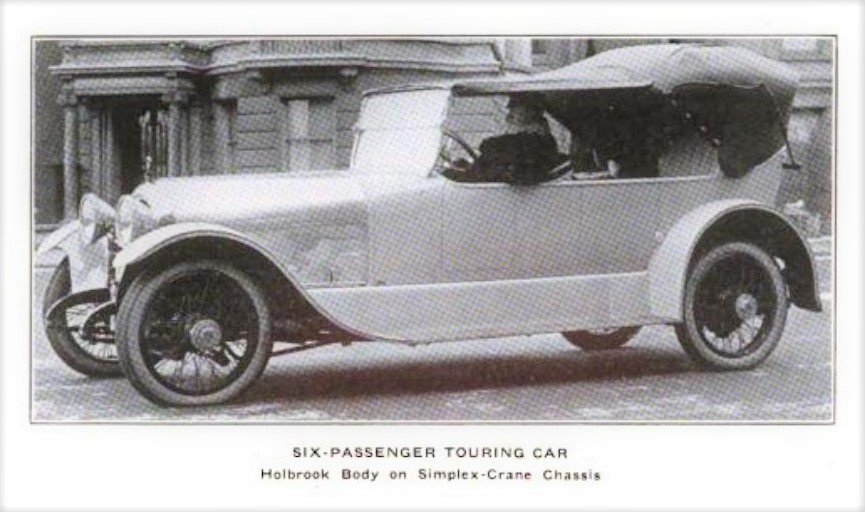
1917 Simplex Crane Model 5 - Holbrook Touring body

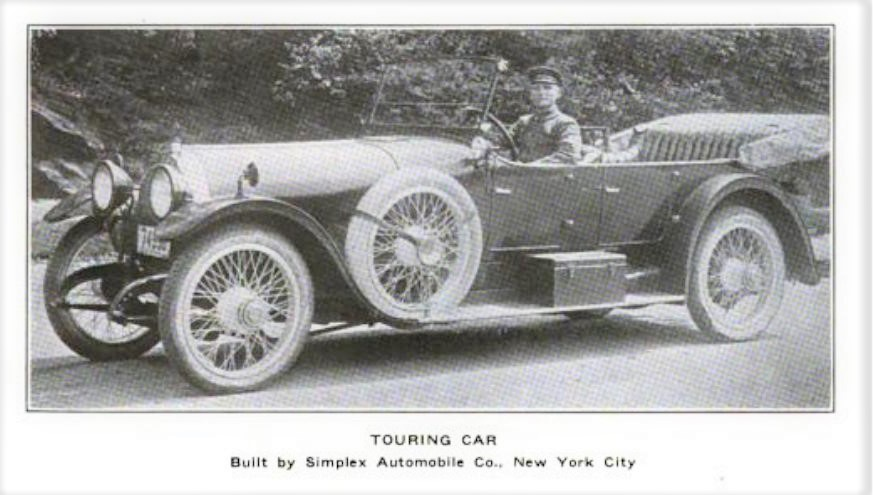
1917 Simplex Crane Model 5 - Simplex Touring body

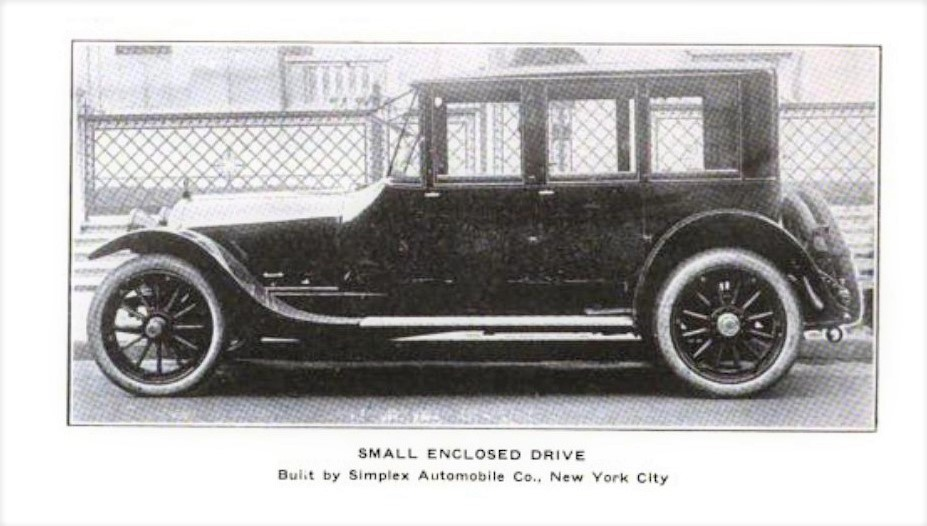
1917 Simplex Crane Model 5 - Simplex Enclosed Drive body

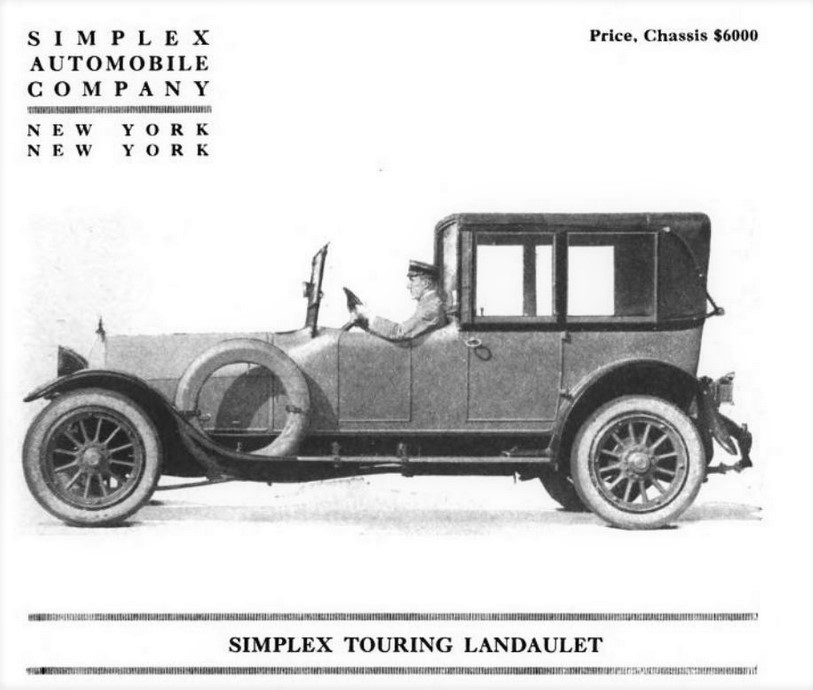
1917 Simplex Crane Model 5 - Stone Landaulet body

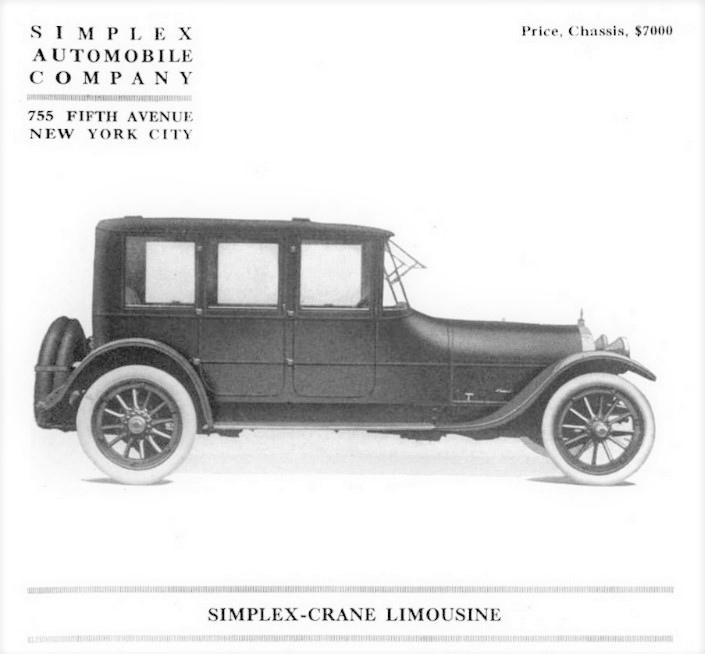
1918 Simplex Crane Model 5 - Simplex Limousine body. This image was used again for the 1921 Handbook of Automobiles.

=== Wright-Martin and World War I ===
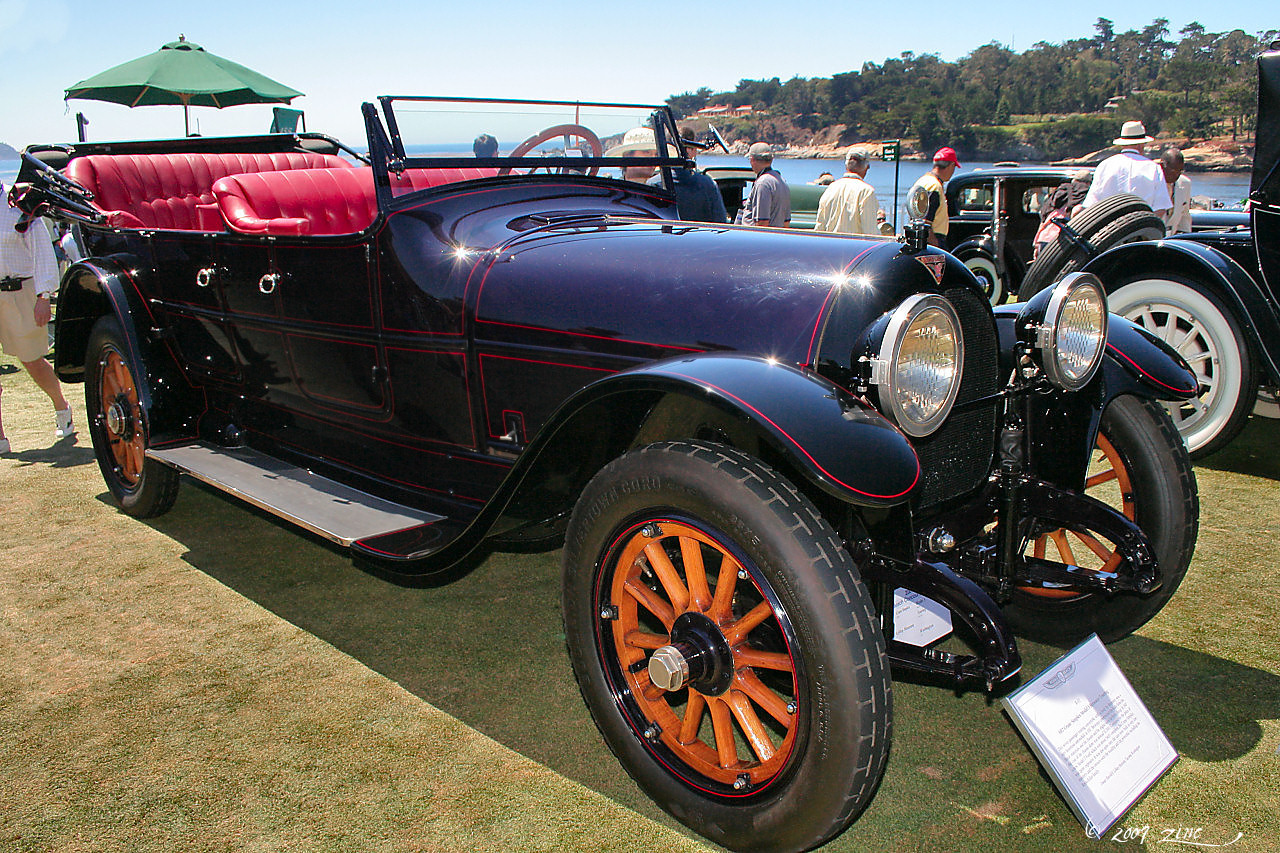
1917 Simplex Crane Model 5 - Brewster Touring body

In October 1915, the Wright Company of Garwood, New Jersey entered into an agreement to purchase the Simplex Automobile Company. In November Henry Lockhart, Jr. became President of Wright. In August of 1916 Wright Company merged with the Glenn L. Martin Company and the new Wright-Martin Aircraft Corporation would purchase all outstanding Simplex Automobile Company stock to make it a wholly owned subsidiary. Henry Lockhart, Jr. and Henry M. Crane would continue as Directors with Wright-Martin.

The Simplex plant would begin construction of aviation motors for Wright-Martin. Morris Metcalf was appointed vice-president in charge of the Simplex departments of sales, body, service and publicity. The Simplex Automobile Company plant was enlarged to begin production off the Hispano-Suiza airplane engine under license.

Simplex Automobile production at New Brunswick ceased in October 1917, as Wright-Martin concentrated Simplex production on airplane engines for World War I.

=== Slow Demise ===
In January 1920, the Mercer Motor Company of Trenton, NJ under the control of Emlen S. Hare, would absorb the assets of the Simplex Automobile Company. Automobile equipment was relocated to the Vernon Avenue building in Queens which had been used as a service department. In February 1920 Hare's Motors, Incorporated was organized to take over the assets of Locomobile, Mercer and Simplex. Kelly-Springfield Motor Truck Company was added in November 1920.

In July 1921 Hare's motors announced it would be dissolved and the separate units would reorganize as individual companies. Simplex which was still not producing cars, reverted to Mercer ownership. By July 1922, a reorganization of Mercer Motors and reversal of its arrangements with Hare Motors was finally completed. In November of 1922, Henry M. Crane announced the Crane-Simplex Company with the Queens, New York plant and assets being purchased from Mercer. Plans for 100 cars per year production were spelled out, but it appears production never resumed. Henry M. Crane became a consulting engineer to Alfred P. Sloan of General Motors.

== Advertisements ==
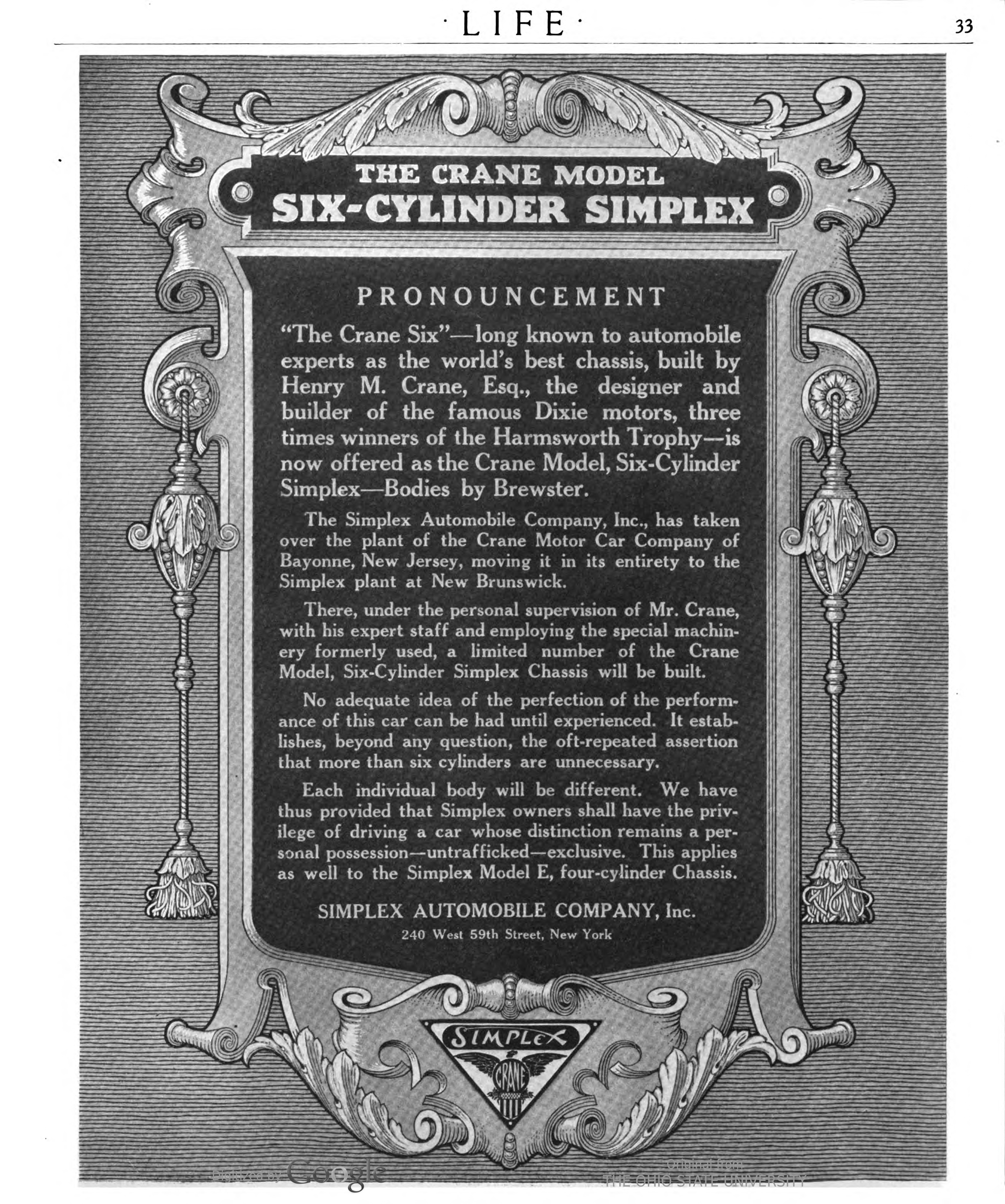
The Crane Model Six-Cylinder Simplex Pronouncement 1915

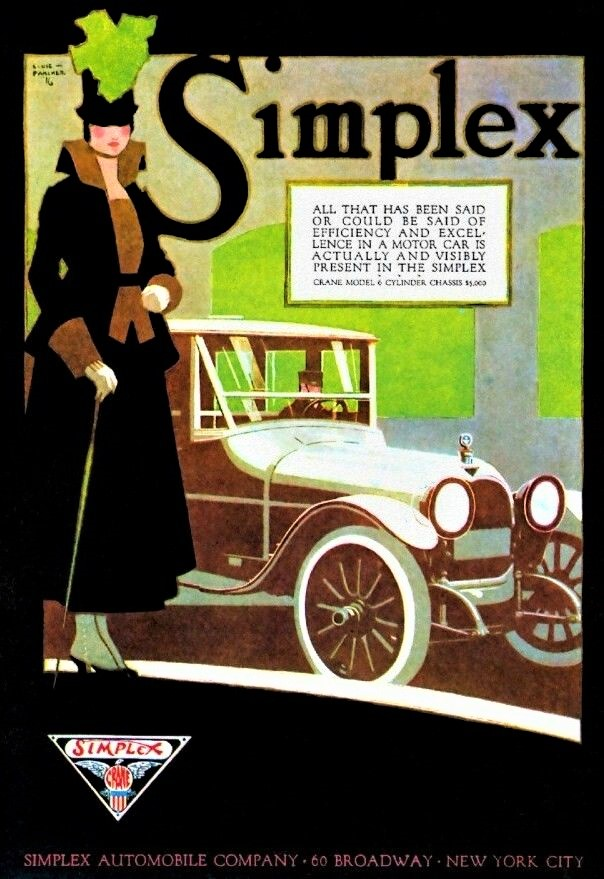
1915 Simplex Crane Model advertisement in Life

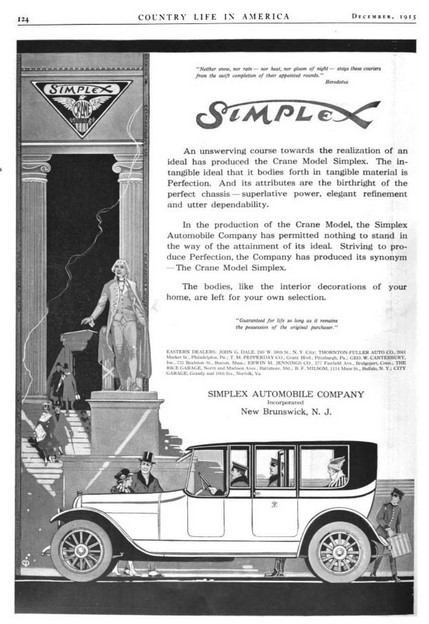
1915 Simplex Crane Model advertisement in Country Life

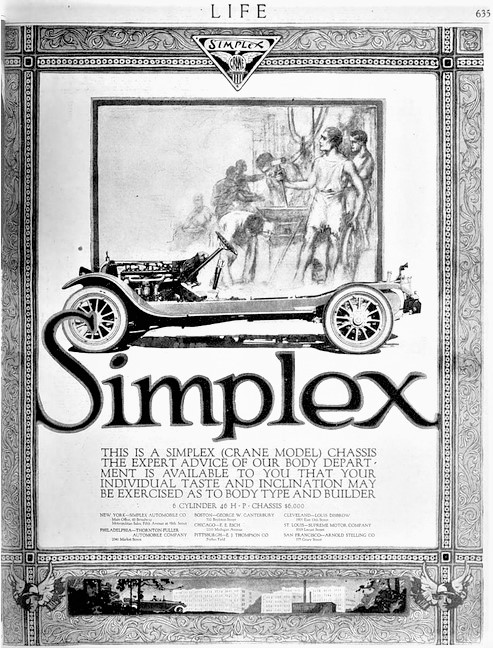
1916 Simplex (Crane Model) advertisement in Life

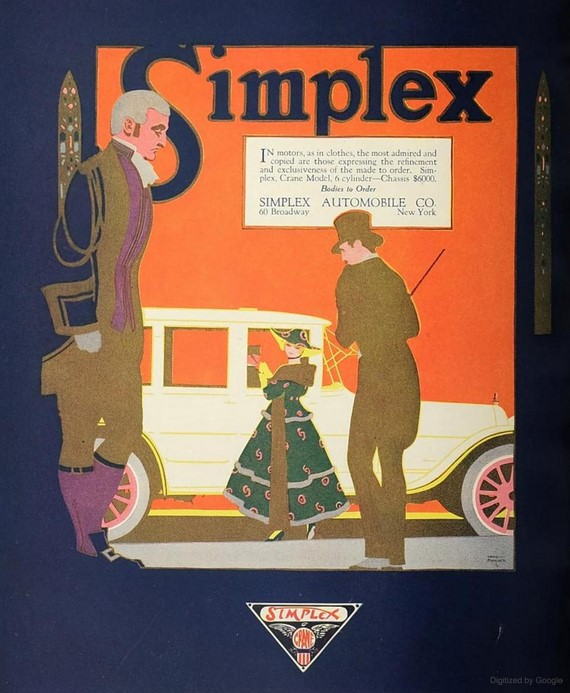
1916 Simplex Crane Model advertisement in Life Christmas edition

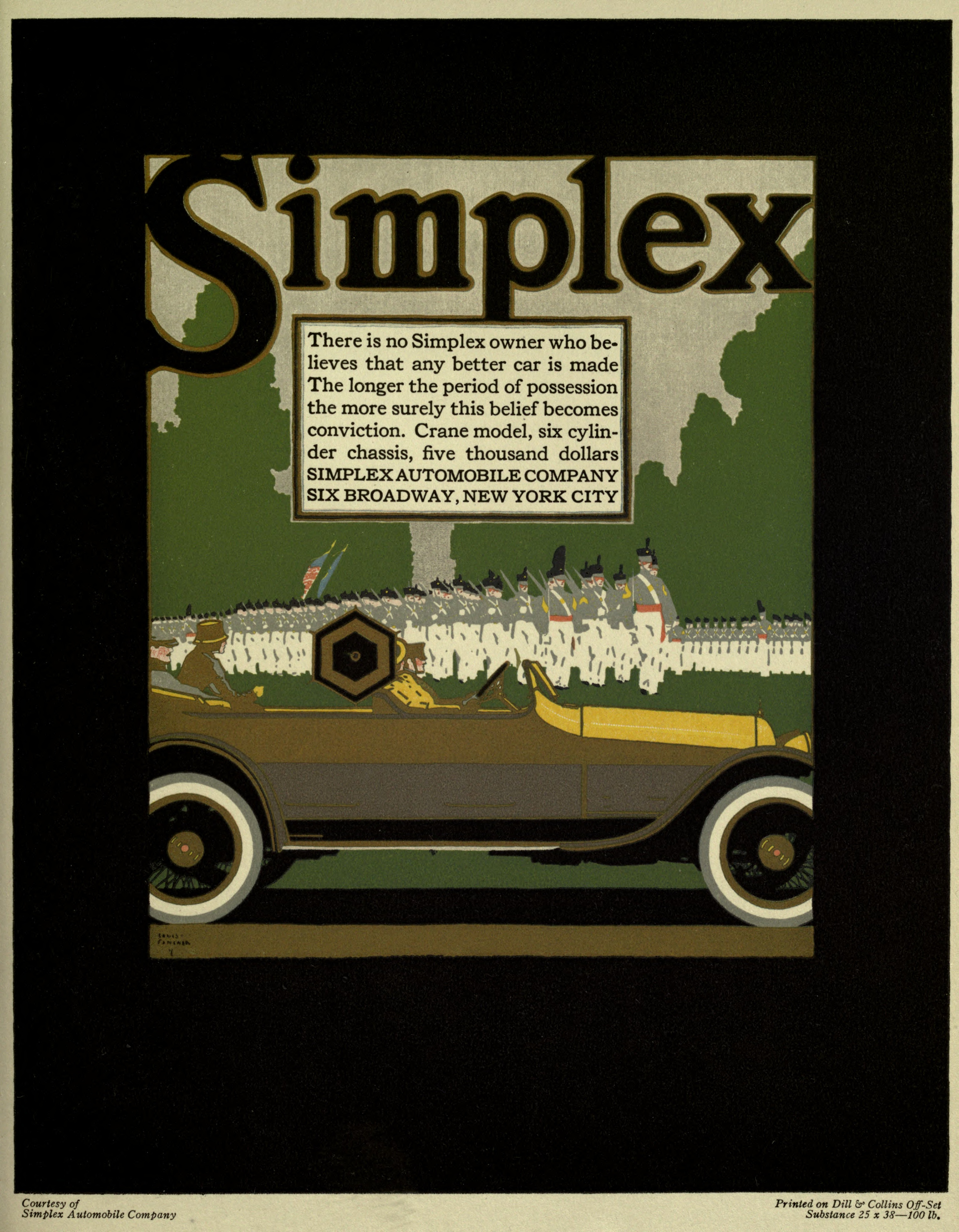
1917 Simplex Crane Model poster by Louis Fancher

== Models ==
From 1911, the Simplex Automobile Company concentrated on the sale of chassis over completed cars, working with the best known automobile coachbuilders of the era to provide the bodies.

| Year | model | cylinder | Power ( hp ) | Wheelbase (cm/in) | body style |
|---|---|---|---|---|---|
| 1907-1908 | Model 50 | 4 | 50 | 315/124 | Toy tonneau 4 seater |
| 1909 | Model 50 | 4 | 50 | 315/124 | Speed Car 2 seater, Toy Tonneau 4 seater |
| 1909 | Model 50 | 4 | 50 | 323/127 | Landaulet 7-seater, sedan 7-seater |
| 1909 | Model 50 | 4 | 50 | 328/129 | Touring car 7-seater |
| 1910 | Model 50 | 4 | 50 | 315/124 | runabout |
| 1910 | Model 50 | 4 | 50 | 328/129 | touring car |
| 1910 | Model 90 | 4 | 90 | 315/124 | Touring cars 5-seater and 7-seater |
| 1911 | Model 38 | 4 | 38 | 323/127 | Touring car 7-seater |
| 1911 | Model 50 | 4 | 50 | 315/124 | chassis only |
| 1911 | Model 50 | 4 | 50 | 328/129 | chassis only |
| 1911 | Model 90 | 4 | 90 | 315/124 | Touring car 5-seater; chassis |
| 1912-1913 | Model 38 | 4 | 38 | 323/127 | Touring cars 4-seater and 5-seater |
| 1912-1913 | Model 38 | 4 | 38 | 348/137 | 7-seater touring car, 7-seater landaulet, 7-seater sedan |
| 1912-1913 | Model 50 | 4 | 50 | 315/124 | Touring car 4-seater |
| 1912-1913 | Model 50 | 4 | 50 | 328/129 | Touring car 5-seater |
| 1912-1913 | Model 50 | 4 | 50 | 348/137 | 7-seater touring car, 7-seater landaulet, 7-seater sedan |
| 1912-1913 | Model 75 | 4 | 90 | 315/124 | 4-seater and 7-seater touring car, 2-seater runabout, sedan, landaulet |
| 1912-1913 | Model 90 | 4 | 90 | 315/124 | Touring cars 4-seater and 5-seater |
| 1914 | Model 38 | 4 | 38 | 348/137 | Tourabout 4-seater, Coach 7-seater |
| 1914 | Model 50 | 4 | 50 | 348/137 | Tourabout 4 seater |
| 1914 | Model 75 | 4 | 75 | 315/124 | chassis only |
| 1915 | Model 38 | 4 | 38 | 348/137 | Sedan 7-seater |
| 1915 | Model 50 | 4 | 50 | 348/137 | Touring car 5-seater |
| 1915 | Model 75 | 4 | 75 | 315/124 | chassis only |
| 1915 | Crane Model 5 | 6 | 46 | 366/145 | Touring car 7-seater |
| 1916 | Model 50 | 4 | 50 | 348/137 | Touring car 5-seater |
| 1916 | Crane Model 5 | 6 | 46 | 366/145 | Touring car 7-seater |
| 1917-1919 | Crane Model 5 | 6 | 46 | 366/145 | chassis only |

== Production ==
A total of 1,865 vehicles were built. This includes 467 vehicles designed by Henry Crane.

| Year | production |
|---|---|
| 1907 | 93 |
| 1908 | 178 |
| 1909 | 100 |
| 1910 | 123 |
| 1911 | 150 |
| 1912 | 200 |
| 1913 | 250 |
| 1914 | 250 |
| 1915 | 223 |
| 1916 | 121 |
| 1917 | 116 |
| 1918 | 61 |
| total | 1,865 |
