= 1910 AAA Championship Car season =

Auto racing season

- AAA National Championship Trail

Season
- Races: 19
- Start date: May 5
- End date: October 1

Awards
- National champion: none declared

The 1910 AAA Championship Car season consisted of 19 races, beginning in Atlanta, Georgia on May 5 and concluding in Long Island, New York on October 1. AAA did not award points towards a National Championship during the 1910 season, and did not declare a National Champion.

The de facto National Champion as polled by the American automobile journal Motor Age, was Ray Harroun. Points were not awarded by the AAA Contest Board during the 1910 season. Harroun was named the champion by Chris G. Sinsabaugh, an editor at Motor Age, based upon merit and on track performance. A points table was created retroactively in 1927. At a later point, it was recognized by historians that these championship results should be considered unofficial.

== Schedule and results ==
| Date | Race name Distance (miles) | Track | Location | Type | Notes | Pole position | Winning driver |
|---|---|---|---|---|---|---|---|
| May 5 | Atlanta Speedway Trophy (200) | Atlanta Motordrome | Atlanta, Georgia | 2 Mile Dirt Oval | Restricted to stock chassis, 301–450 ci | | Ray Harroun |
| May 6 | Atlanta Race 2 (60) | Atlanta Motordrome | Atlanta, Georgia | 2 Mile Dirt Oval | Restricted to stock chassis, 161–230 ci | | Bill Endicott |
| May 6 | Atlanta Race 3 (50) | Atlanta Motordrome | Atlanta, Georgia | 2 Mile Dirt Oval | George Robertson held track record of 40:14.03, which was not broken. | | Herbert Lytle |
| May 7 | Atlanta Automobile Association Trophy (200) | Atlanta Motordrome | Atlanta, Georgia | 2 Mile Dirt Oval | Restricted to cars 451–600 cu, race completed in heavy rain | | Tom Kincade |
| May 27 | Prest-O-Lite Trophy Race (100) | Indianapolis Motor Speedway | Indianapolis, Indiana | 2.5 Mile Brick Oval | Open to cars with 301–450 ci displacement | | Tom Kincade |
| May 28 | Wheeler-Schebler Trophy Race (200) | Indianapolis Motor Speedway | Indianapolis, Indiana | 2.5 Mile Brick Oval | | | Ray Harroun |
| May 30 | Remy Brassard Trophy 1 (50) | Indianapolis Motor Speedway | Indianapolis, Indiana | 2.5 Mile Brick Oval | 231–300 ci | | Ray Harroun |
| July 2 | Remy Brassard Trophy 2 (100) | Indianapolis Motor Speedway | Indianapolis, Indiana | 2.5 Mile Brick Oval | Bob Burman broke Tom Kincade's track record of 1:23:43. | | Bob Burman |
| July 4 | Cobe Trophy Race (200) | Indianapolis Motor Speedway | Indianapolis, Indiana | 2.5 Mile Brick Oval | | | Joe Dawson |
| August 26 | Kane County Trophy Race (162) | Elgin Road Race Course | Elgin, Illinois | 8.094 Mile Road Course | Open to cars 231–300 ci displacement | | Dave Buck |
| August 26 | Illinois Trophy Race (194) | Elgin Road Race Course | Elgin, Illinois | 8.094 Mile Road Course | Open to cars 301–450 ci displacement | | Al Livingston |
| August 27 | Elgin National Trophy Race (300) | Elgin Road Race Course | Elgin, Illinois | 8.094 Mile Road Course | Open to cars 600 ci and under | Al Livingston | Ralph Mulford |
| September 3 | Indianapolis Race 6 (100) | Indianapolis Motor Speedway | Indianapolis, Indiana | 2.5 Mile Brick Oval | | Eddie Hearne | Eddie Hearne |
| September 3 | Remy Grand Trophy Race (100) | Indianapolis Motor Speedway | Indianapolis, Indiana | 2.5 Mile Brick Oval | | Charles Merz | Howdy Wilcox |
| September 5 | Indianapolis Race 8 (50) | Indianapolis Motor Speedway | Indianapolis, Indiana | 2.5 Mile Brick Oval | Free-For-All | | Eddie Hearne |
| September 5 | Indianapolis Race 9 (200) | Indianapolis Motor Speedway | Indianapolis, Indiana | 2.5 Mile Brick Oval | Stock class, 600 ci and under displacement | | Johnny Aitken |
| October 1 | Massapequa Sweepstakes* (126) | Long Island Motor Parkway | Long Island, New York | 12.64 Mile Road Course | Stock class, 161–230 ci displacement | Bill Endicott | Bill Endicott |
| October 1 | Wheatley Hills Sweepstakes* (190) | Long Island Motor Parkway | Long Island, New York | 12.64 Mile Road Course | Stock class, 231–300 ci displacement | Billy Pearce | Frank Gelnaw |
| October 1 | William K. Vanderbilt Cup* (278) | Long Island Motor Parkway | Long Island, New York | 12.64 Mile Road Course | Stock chassis, 301–600 ci; Milton Bacon, riding mechanic for Harold Stone, and Charles Miller, riding mechanic for Louis Chevrolet, fatally injured | Al Livingston | Harry Grant |

* All events run concurrently; starting times were: Vanderbilt 6:00 AM, Wheatley Hills 7:00 AM, Massapequa 7:30 AM

== Leading National Championship standings ==
The points paying system for the 1909–1915 and 1917–1919 season were retroactively applied in 1927 and revised in 1951 using the points system from 1920.

| # | Driver | Sponsor | Points |
|---|---|---|---|
| 1 | Ray Harroun | Marmon | 1240 |
| 2 | Joe Dawson | Marmon | 1125 |
| 3 | Al Livingston | National | 1020 |
| 4 | Harry Grant | Alco | 760 |
| 5 | Johnny Aitken | National | 715 |

== General references ==
- http://www.champcarstats.com/year/1910.htm accessed 9/18/10
- accessed 9/18/10
- http://www.motorsport.com/stats/champ/byyear.asp?Y=1910 accessed 9/18/10
