= Smith and Mabley =

Defunct American motor vehicle manufacturer

Smith and Mabley Smith & Mabley Manufacturing Company
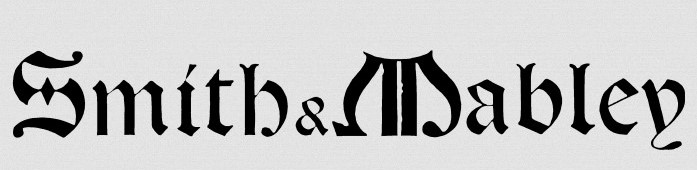
- Smith & Mabley logo from advertisement
- Founded: 1900; 126 years ago
- Founder: A. D. Proctor Smith and Carlton R. Mabley
- Defunct: 1907; 119 years ago
- Fate: Bankruptcy
- Successor: Simplex Automobile Company
- Headquarters: New York, New York, United States
- Key people: A. D. Proctor Smith, Carlton R. Maybley, G. Edward Franquist
- Products: Automobiles
- Production output: 233 (1902-1907)
- Brands: American C.G.V. and S & M Simplex

Smith & Mabley was an American veteran era importer of European automobiles and produced the American C. G. V. automobile in 1902, and the S & M Simplex automobile from 1904 to 1907, in New York City.

== History ==
A. D. Proctor Smith and his brother-in-law, Carlton R. Mabley founded Smith & Mabley in New York City in 1900 as an import company for European automobiles. Vehicles from C. G. V., Panhard, Renault and Mors were imported, followed later by Mercedes and Isotta Fraschini. In 1902 production of automobiles began under license from C. G. V. with the brand name of American C.G.V.. Production ended in 1903 after seven vehicles had been manufactured.

In 1903 Smith and Mabley, along with Winton was sued regarding infringement of the Selden Patent. Later that year Winton and Smith & Mabley joined A.L.A.M. and the lawsuit was dropped. In 1903 Smith & Mabley decided to start making vehicles again. They bought a seven-story plant on East 83rd Street. G. Edward Franquist designed the plant and was both Chief Engineer and Superintendent of the factory. Franquist attributed his engineering designs as being influenced by the finest European motor cars. Franquist was a founding member of the S.A.E. and was the Simplex designer until 1915. In 1903 Smith & Mabley offices and showroom and garage were located to a new building at 513-519 Seventh Avenue.

In 1903, Franquist designed a four-cylinder engine that was used on motor boats for racing including the Vingt-et-Un, Challenger and Dixie I. The Dixie I won the Harmsworth (British International) Trophy in 1907. It was announced that motor boats and motor cars would begin production in May 1904. The new marque name was S & M Simplex and the Smith & Mabley Manufacturing Company was set up for production.

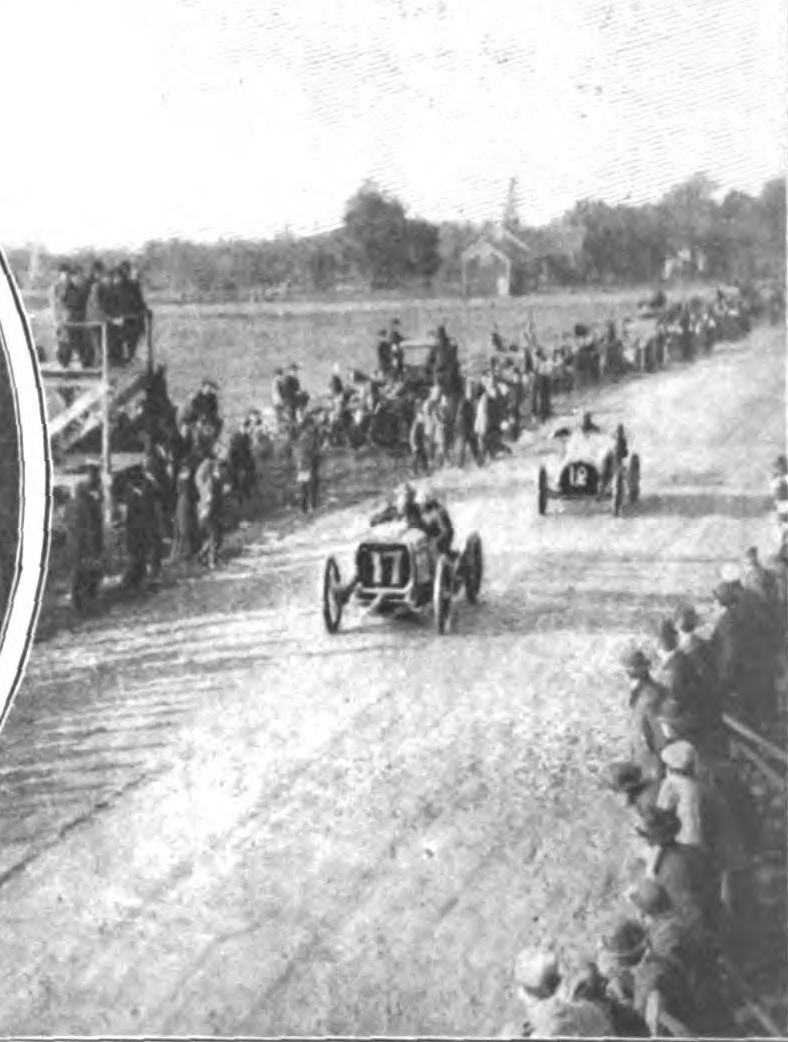
1904 Vanderbilt Cup - Clement (12) passing Frank Croker (17)

A Smith & Mabley Simplex 75-hp racing car competed in the 1904 Vanderbilt Cup, owned and driven by Frank Croker. Too many holes had been drilled in the frame to try to lighten the car, and it collapsed during the race seriously slowing his speed. Croker was in his seventh round when the race was stopped. Frank Croker and his mechanic were killed during a speed run in his S & M Simplex racer on the Ormond-Daytona Beach in 1905, while swerving to avoid a motorcycle.

Production of the S & M Simplex ran until early 1907. A total of over 220 vehicles were built. Smith & Mabley suffered during the recession and stock market slides in late 1906 that led up to the Panic of 1907. Receivers were called in and the company would be declared bankrupt in 1907. Friend and textile importer Herman Broesel, Sr., took over the Smith & Mabley assets in 1907 and formed the Simplex Automobile Company, and continued production as the Simplex.

=== American C.G.V. ===
Smith & Mabley were importers of the Charron, Girardot & Voigt motor car made in France. In 1902 and early 1903, the company produced the car under license. Seven cars, with tonneau bodies supplied by the coach builders J.M. Quinby & Sons and assembled by the Rome Locomotive Works in Rome, New York were built. The brand name was American C. G. V. and the price as a five-passenger tonneau was $5,500, equivalent to $204,663 in 2025. After the short production run, Smith & Mabley returned to importing the C. G. V.

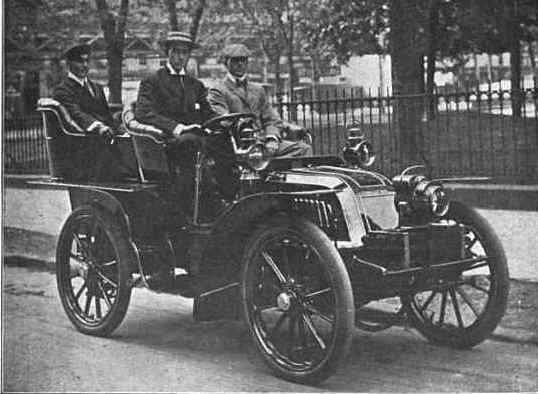
1902 American C. G. V. 15 hp Tonneau

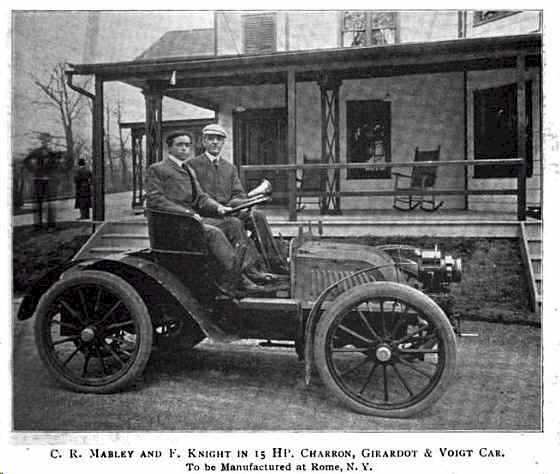
1902 C. G. V. 15 hp runabout with Carlton R. Mabley in the drivers seat

=== S & M Simplex ===
All S & M Simplex's were powered by 4-cylinder engines. The first model from 1904 was the 30/35 HP with a T-head engine. Engine power was transmitted to the rear axle through a four-speed gearbox and chains. Its chassis had a wheelbase of 105-inches. The open touring car offered space for five people. In the same year, the smaller 18 HP was added to the range, although there was less demand for it. It had a wheelbase of 91-inches and a choice of a two-seat runabout or a five-seat tonneau.

In 1905 only the 30/35 hp was offered. The wheelbase was extended to 106-inches on a Brougham body style. In 1906 the car was described as a 30 HP, available with a wheelbase of 106-inches a five-seat touring car and with a wheelbase of 113-inch as a seven-seat touring car.

The 30/35 HP name was used again for 1907. With a wheelbase of 106-inches, there was a three-seat runabout and a five-seat touring car. A longer five-seat touring car had a wheelbase of 111-inches. A wheelbase of 115-inches enabled a seven-seat touring car. There was also a more powerful and more expensive model, the 50/70 HP. It had a wheelbase of 124-inches and was available as an enclosed limousine with five to seven seats.

Priced at the top of the Import and luxury markets, S & M Simplex's factory prices in 1907 ran from a low of $4,950 (equivalent to $171,040 in 2025) for a runabout to a high of $6,400 (equivalent to $221,143 in 2025) for limousines.

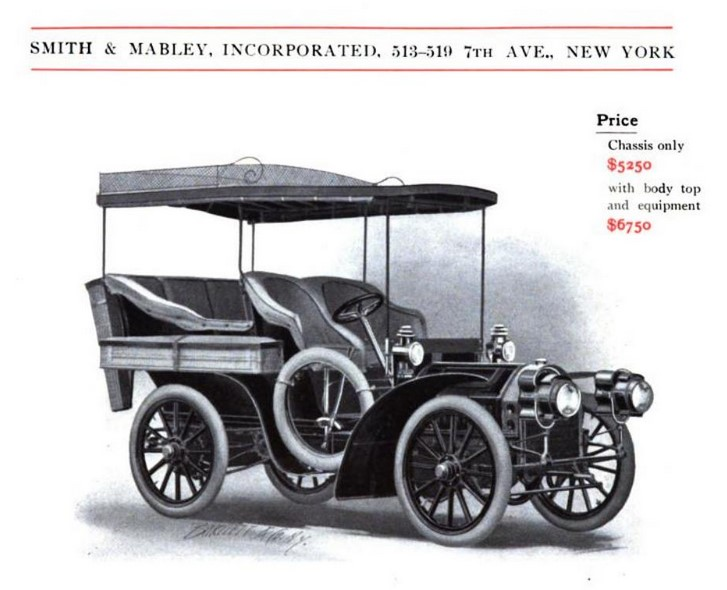
1904 S & M Simplex Model BA

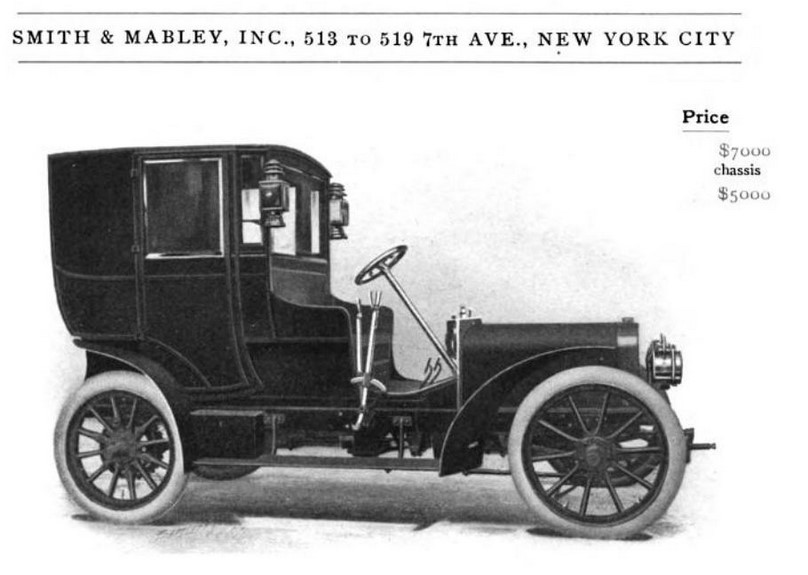
1905 S & M Simplex 30 hp

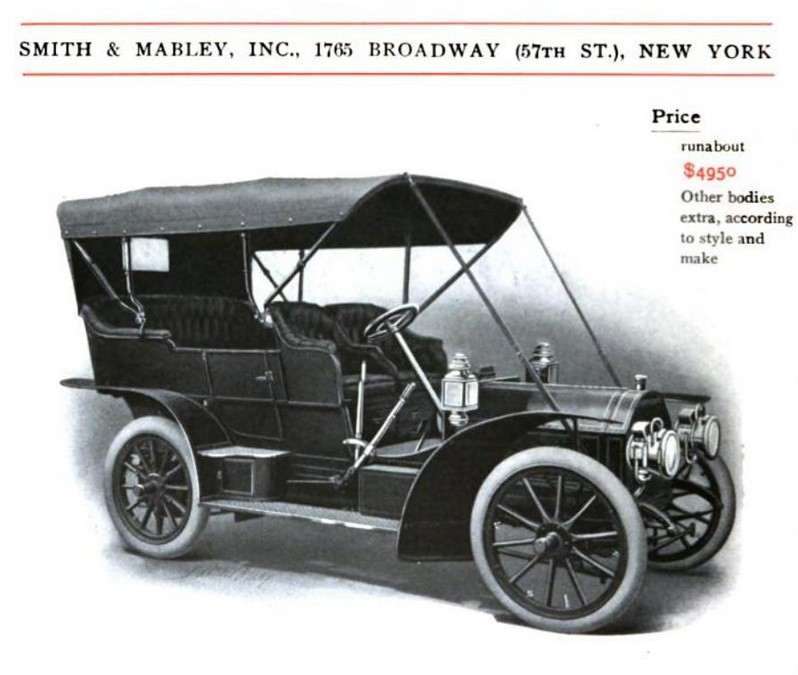
1906 S & M Simplex Model AA

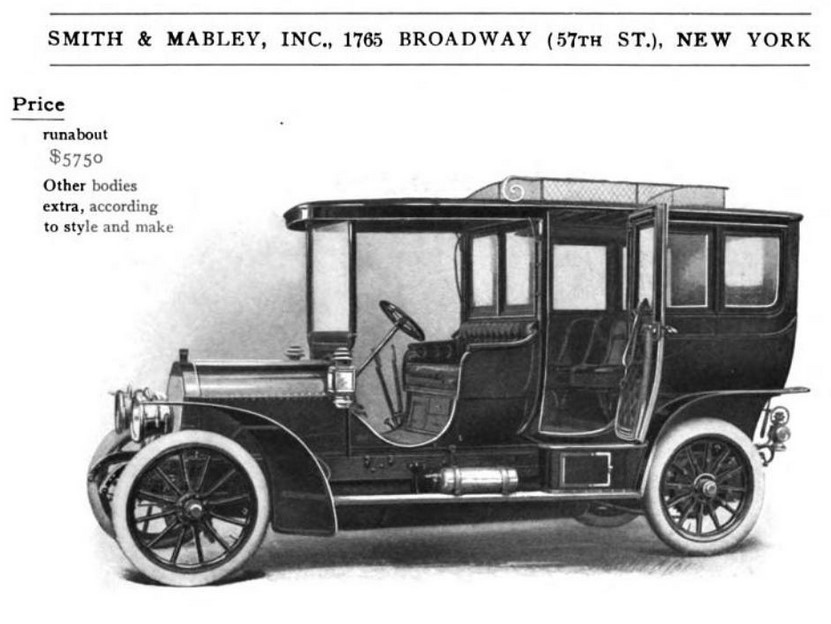
1906 S & M Simplex Model DA

== Model overview ==
Year	model	cylinder	Power ( hp )	Wheelbase (in)	Construction
1904	18 HP	4	18	91	2-seater runabout, 5-seater tonneau
1904	30/35HP	4	30/35	105	Touring car 5-seater
1905	30/35HP	4	30/35	106	Brougham
1906	30 HP	4	30	106	Touring car 5-seater
1906	30 HP	4	30	113	Touring car 7-seater
1907	30/35HP	4	30/35	106	3-seater runabout, 5-seater touring car
1907	30/35HP	4	30/35	111	Touring car 5-seater
1907	30/35HP	4	30/35	115	Touring car 7-seater
1907	50/70HP	4	50/70	124	Limousine 5 to 7 seats

== Production ==
Year	production number
1902-1903	7
1904	73
1905	78
1906-07	75
total	233

== Advertisements ==
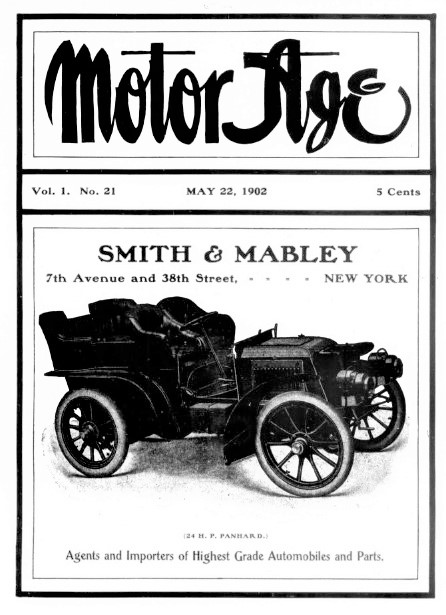
1902 Smith and Mabley on cover of Motor Age

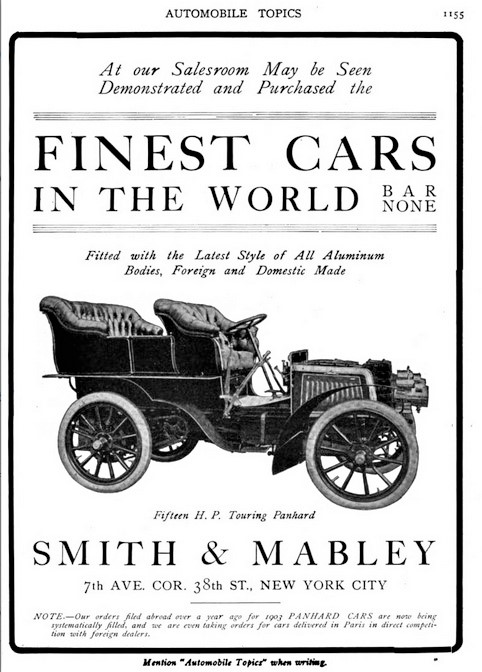
1903 Smith and Mabley advertisement in Automobile Topics

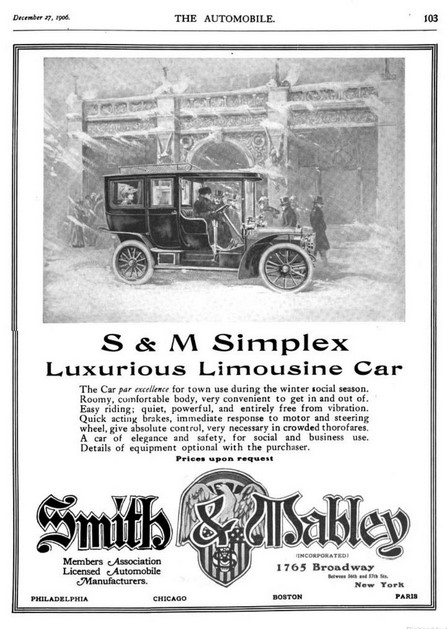
1906 S & M Simplex advertisement in The Automobile
