= Prest-O-Lite Trophy Race =

Auto race

The Prest-O-Lite Trophy Race was an automobile race held at the Indianapolis Motor Speedway in 1909 and 1910, the two years before the first Indianapolis 500. The trophy was sponsored by the Prest-O-Lite Company, a manufacturer of automotive lighting systems. Carl Fisher and James Allison, two of the four co-founders of the Speedway, were also two of the three co-founders of Prest-O-Lite.

== Race results ==
Year	Date	Winning Driver	Car	Race Distance		Time of Race	Winning Speed	Starting Cars
Year	Date	Winning Driver	Car	Miles	Laps	Time of Race	Winning Speed	Starting Cars
1909	Aug 19	(United States) Bob Burman	Buick	250	100	04:38:57.40	53.772 mph	9
1910	May 27	(United States) Tom Kincade	National	100	40	01:23:43.12	71.670 mph	6

== Sources ==
- Scott, D. Bruce; INDY: Racing Before the 500; Indiana Reflections; 2005; ISBN 0-9766149-0-1.
- Galpin, Darren; A Record of Motorsport Racing Before World War I.
- http://www.motorsport.com/stats/champ/byyear.asp?Y=1909
- http://www.motorsport.com/stats/champ/byyear.asp?Y=1910
- http://www.champcarstats.com/year/1909.htm
- http://www.champcarstats.com/year/1910.htm
