= Cobe Trophy Race =

American automobile race

The Cobe Trophy Race was an automobile race held in Indiana, in 1909 and 1910. The trophy was named for, and donated by, Ira M. Cobe, president of the Chicago Automobile Club. As one of the first long-distance races in the area, it was billed as the "Vanderbilt of the west," a reference to the Vanderbilt Cup Race, which had been held in Long Island, New York since 1904. The first running took place at the Crown Point Road Race Circuit, in northwestern Indiana. For the second year, proposals were submitted by the Indianapolis Motor Speedway and by the Elgin Road Race Course, just west of Chicago. Ultimately, the Board of Managers of the Chicago Automobile Club decided to make the 1910 race a speedway event, rather than a road course contest, and hence the second race was run at Indianapolis. At the time of this decision, the Club also announced the intent to bring the race to the Chicago area in 1911. As it turns out, though, there was no Cobe Trophy race in 1911 or in later years. Only two drivers competed in both Cobe races, 1909 winner Louis Chevrolet and his teammate, Bob Burman.

== Race results ==
| Year | Date | Venue | Winning Driver | Car | Race Distance | | Time of Race | Winning Speed | Starting Cars |
| Year | Date | Venue | Winning Driver | Car | Miles | Laps | Time of Race | Winning Speed | Starting Cars |
|---|---|---|---|---|---|---|---|---|---|
| 1909 | June 19 | Crown Point Road Race Circuit | (United States) Louis Chevrolet | Buick | 395.6 | 17 | 08:01:39 | 49.287 mph | 12 |
| 1910 | July 4 | Indianapolis Motor Speedway | (United States) Joe Dawson | Marmon | 200 | 80 | 02:43:26.13 | 73.423 mph | 14 |

== Sources ==
- "The Cobe Cup Auto Race of 1909;" Lowell Tribune; Apr. 28, 1998 (on line at *http://www.lowellpl.lib.in.us/s1998apr.htm).
- "Crowds Expected At Cobe Trophy;" New York Times; April 4, 1909.
- "Elgin Wants Cobe Race;" New York Times; Nov. 21, 1909.
- "Cobe Cup Contest at Indianapolis;" New York Times; June 5, 1910.
- https://web.archive.org/web/20111226011449/http://www.motorsport.com/stats/champ/byyear.asp?Y=1909
- http://www.champcarstats.com/year/1909.htm
- Scott, D. Bruce; INDY: Racing Before the 500; Indiana Reflections; 2005; ISBN 0-9766149-0-1.
