= Crown Point Road Race Circuit =

Coordinates: 41°25′N 87°22′W

The Crown Point Road Race Circuit was an automobile street circuit located in northwest Indiana, and operated only during the summer of 1909. It was made up of public highways, with a lap distance of 23.27 miles (37.45 km). The majority of the course was on rural highways, with several long straightaways, one exceeding 8 miles (13 km). The course also went through the towns of Crown Point, Lowell and Cedar Lake. In preparation for use as a race course, pedestrian bridges were built over the road (as well as one large enough to accommodate horses), several grandstands were erected, and nine telegraph stations were in place to relay news to the spectators. The feature event was the Cobe Trophy Race, promoted by the Chicago Automobile Club and its president, Ira Cobe. The day before, the Indiana Trophy Race was held for smaller cars (those with engines of less than 300 cubic inch displacement). Five drivers competed in both races (including Cobe Trophy winner Louis Chevrolet). Ultimately, the course was a commercial disappointment, as spectators chose to watch from the miles of open countryside, and bring their own picnics, rather than pay for the grandstands and concessions offered by the promoters.

== Race results ==
Year	Date	Race Name	Winning Driver	Car	Race Distance		Time of Race	Winning Speed
Year	Date	Race Name	Winning Driver	Car	Miles	Laps	Time of Race	Winning Speed
1909	June 18	Indiana Trophy	(United States) Joe Matson	Chalmers-Detroit	232.7	10	04:31:21	51.463 mph
1909	June 19	Cobe Trophy	(United States) Louis Chevrolet	Buick	395.6	17	08:01:39	49.287 mph

"1909 Cobe Cup Race Route"

== Sources ==
"The Cobe Cup Auto Race of 1909;" Lowell Tribune; Apr. 28, 1998 (on line at http://www.lowellpl.lib.in.us/s1998apr.htm).

"Crowds Expected At Cobe Trophy;" New York Times; April 4, 1909.

https://web.archive.org/web/20111226011449/http://www.motorsport.com/stats/champ/byyear.asp?Y=1909

http://www.champcarstats.com/year/1909.htm
